= Sobibór Landscape Park =

Landscape park of Poland

Coordinates: 51.4267°N 23.5774°E

- Sobiborski Park Krajobrazowy
- IUCN category V (protected landscape/seascape)
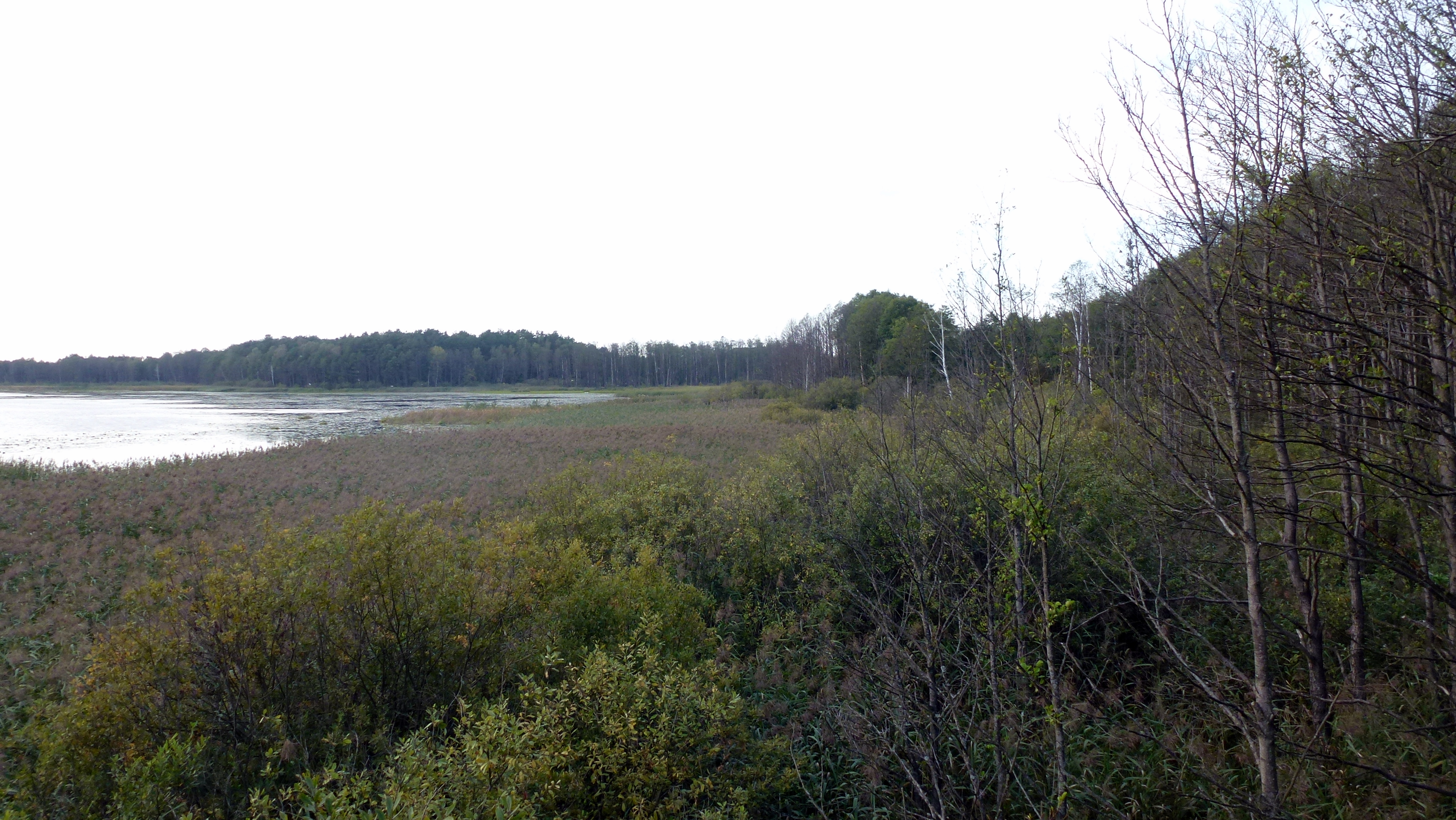
- Żółwiowe Błota nature reserve
- Interactive map of Sobibór Landscape Park
- Location: Lublin Voivodeship
- Area: 10000 ha
- Established: 1983

Sobibór Landscape Park (Sobiborski Park Krajobrazowy) is a protected area (Landscape Park) created in Lublin Voivodeship, eastern Poland in 1983. It takes its name from the village of Sobibór.

The Park lies on an area of 11,165.78 hectares (43.1113 sq mi), within the Włodawa County and three different gminas: the Gmina Włodawa as well as Gmina Hańsk and Gmina Wola Uhruska. It is meant to protect and preserve the natural and ecological resources of the Polesie National Park (Pojezierze Łęczyńsko-Włodawskie) extending westward. The dominant form of land cover are forests, which constitute 75% of the park's area. Other forms of land use include: meadows — 10%, marsh — 5%, agricultural land — 2%, water — 2%.

6 nature reserves: Brudzieniec, Żółwiowe Błota, Małozence, Lake Orchowe, Magazyn, Trzy Jezior. Their total area is 1670.62 ha, which is 16.7% of the park area. Planned biosphere reserve, included in ECONET-POLSKA.
