= Wołoskowola =

- Village
- Location within Poland
- Coordinates: 51°30′N 23°14′E
- Country: Poland
- Voivodeship: Lublin
- County: Włodawa
- Gmina: Stary Brus

Wołoskowola [vɔwɔskɔˈvɔla] is a village in the administrative district of Gmina Stary Brus, within Włodawa County, Lublin Voivodeship, in eastern Poland.
