= Korolówka-Osada =

- Village
- Location within Poland
- Coordinates: 51°35′23″N 23°26′20″E
- Country: Poland
- Voivodeship: Lublin
- County: Włodawa
- Gmina: Włodawa
- Population: 488

Korolówka-Osada [kɔrɔˈlufka ɔˈsada] is a village in the administrative district of Gmina Włodawa, within Włodawa County, Lublin Voivodeship, in eastern Poland, close to the border with Belarus.
