= Piaski Uhruskie =

- Village
- Location within Poland
- Coordinates: 51°18′N 23°36′E
- Country: Poland
- Voivodeship: Lublin
- County: Włodawa
- Gmina: Wola Uhruska

Piaski Uhruskie (Polish pronunciation: [ˈpjaskʲi uˈxruskʲɛ]) is a village in the administrative district of Gmina Wola Uhruska, within Włodawa County, Lublin Voivodeship, in eastern Poland, close to the border with Ukraine.
