= Grobelki, Włodawa County =

Village in Poland

Grobelki
- Village
- Location within Poland
- Coordinates: 51°24′47″N 23°11′34″E
- Country: Poland
- Voivodeship: Lublin
- County: Włodawa
- Gmina: Urszulin

Grobelki [ɡrɔˈbɛlki] is a village in the administrative district of Gmina Urszulin, within Włodawa County, Lublin Voivodeship, in eastern Poland.
