= Nowy Brus =

- Village
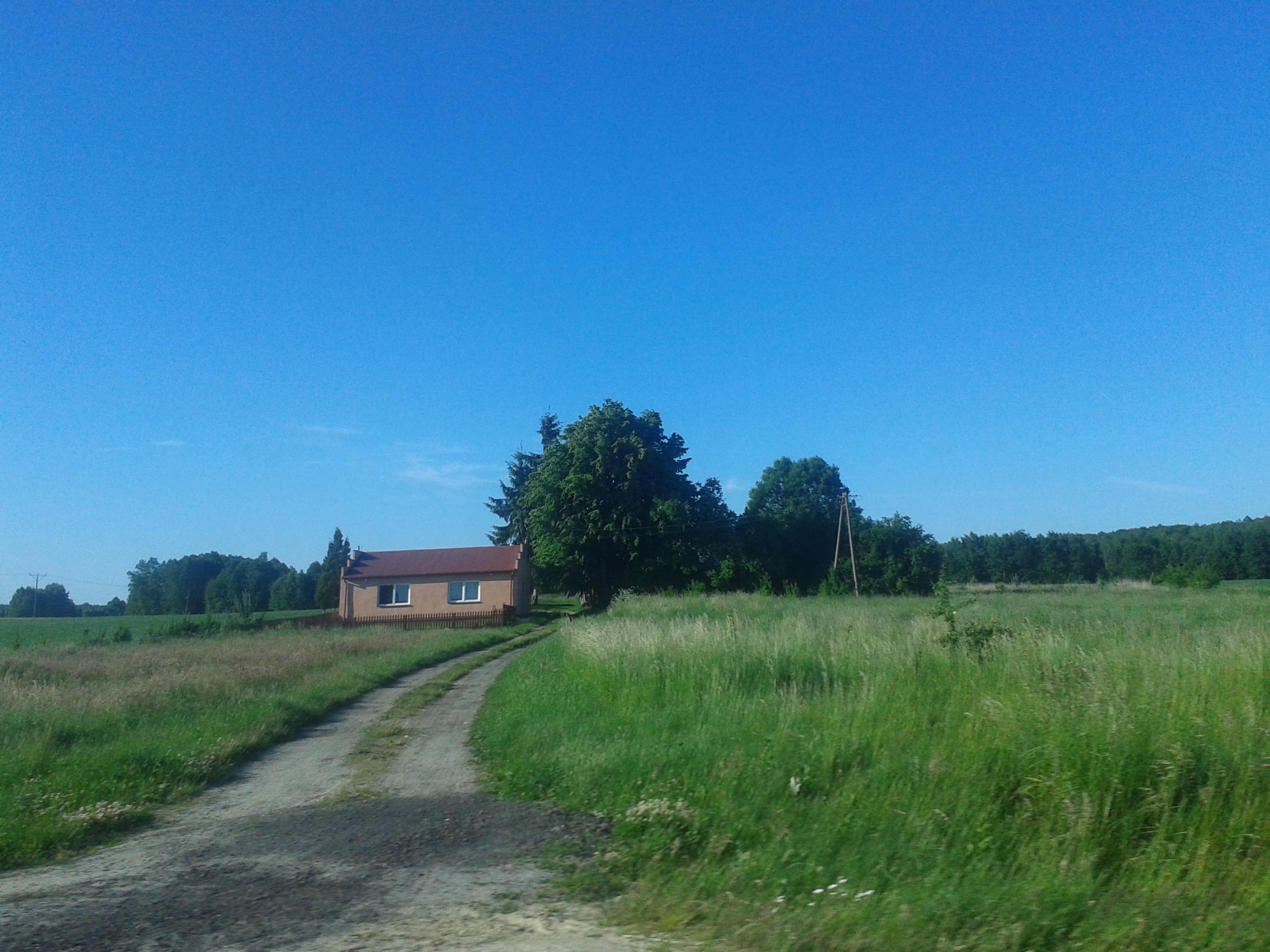

- Location within Poland
- Coordinates: 51°28′59″N 23°18′34″E
- Country: Poland
- Voivodeship: Lublin
- County: Włodawa
- Gmina: Stary Brus

Nowy Brus [ˈnɔvɨ ˈbrus] is a village in the administrative district of Gmina Stary Brus, within Włodawa County, Lublin Voivodeship, in eastern Poland.
