= Orchówek, Lublin Voivodeship =

Orchówek
- Village
- Location within Poland
- Coordinates: 51°35′N 23°34′E
- Country: Poland
- Voivodeship: Lublin
- County: Włodawa
- Gmina: Włodawa
- Elevation: 158 m (518 ft)
- Population: 1,035

Orchówek [ɔrˈxuvɛk] is a village in the administrative district of Gmina Włodawa, within Włodawa County, Lublin Voivodeship, in eastern Poland, close to the border with Belarus.
