= Piaski, Włodawa County =

Piaski
- Village
- Location within Poland
- Coordinates: 51°20′14″N 23°30′43″E
- Country: Poland
- Voivodeship: Lublin
- County: Włodawa
- Gmina: Wola Uhruska
- Time zone: UTC+1 (CET)
  - Summer (DST): UTC+2 (CEST)
- Postal code: 22-230
- Vehicle registration: LWL

Piaski (Polish pronunciation: [ˈpjaskʲi]) is a village in the administrative district of Gmina Wola Uhruska, within Włodawa County, Lublin Voivodeship, in eastern Poland, close to the border with Ukraine.
