= Sumin, Włodawa County =

Sumin
- Village
- Location within Poland
- Coordinates: 51°22′N 23°10′E
- Country: Poland
- Voivodeship: Lublin
- County: Włodawa
- Gmina: Urszulin

Sumin [ˈsumin] is a village in the administrative district of Gmina Urszulin, within Włodawa County, Lublin Voivodeship, in eastern Poland.
