= Nadbużanka =

- Village
- Location within Poland
- Coordinates: 51°19′31″N 23°36′17″E
- Country: Poland
- Voivodeship: Lublin
- County: Włodawa
- Gmina: Wola Uhruska
- Population: 110

Nadbużanka [nadbuˈʐaŋka] is a village in the administrative district of Gmina Wola Uhruska, within Włodawa County, Lublin Voivodeship, in eastern Poland, close to the border with Ukraine.
