= Siedliszcze, Włodawa County =

Siedliszcze
- Village
- Location within Poland
- Coordinates: 51°17′22″N 23°38′25″E
- Country: Poland
- Voivodeship: Lublin
- County: Włodawa
- Gmina: Wola Uhruska
- Population: 860

Siedliszcze [ɕɛdˈliʂt͡ʂɛ] is a village in the administrative district of Gmina Wola Uhruska, within Włodawa County, Lublin Voivodeship, in eastern Poland, close to the border with Ukraine.
