= Łan, Lublin Voivodeship =

Łan
- Village
- Location within Poland
- Coordinates: 51°16′23″N 23°36′52″E
- Country: Poland
- Voivodeship: Lublin
- County: Włodawa
- Gmina: Wola Uhruska

Łan [wan] is a village in the administrative district of Gmina Wola Uhruska, within Włodawa County, Lublin Voivodeship, in eastern Poland, close to the border with Ukraine.
