= Bytyń =

Bytyń may refer to the following places:

- Bytyń, Greater Poland Voivodeship (west-central Poland)
- Bytyń, Lublin Voivodeship (east Poland)
- Bytyń, West Pomeranian Voivodeship (north-west Poland)
