= Wereszczyn =

- Village
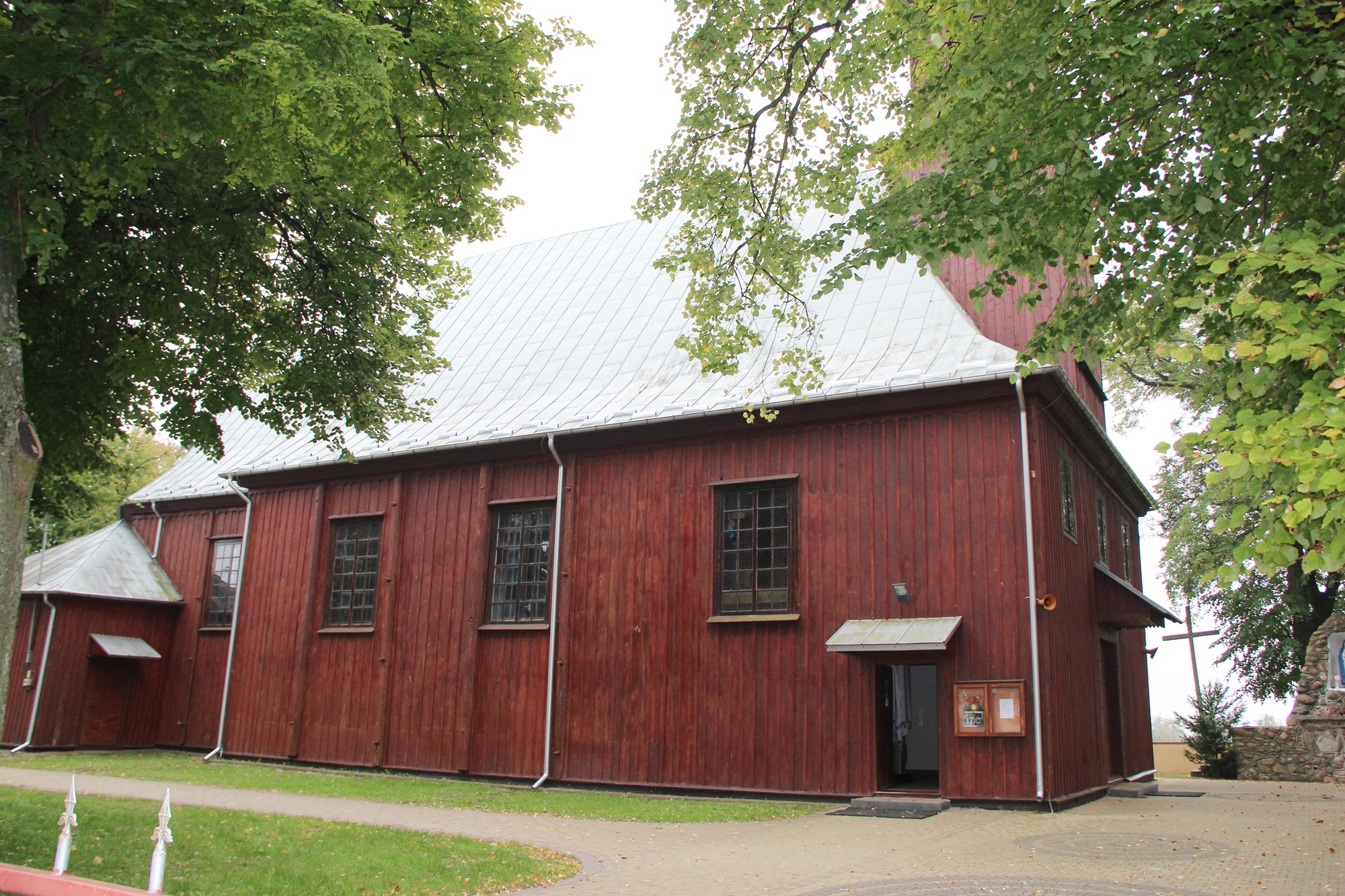
- Church of Saint Stanislaus

- Location within Poland
- Coordinates: 51°22′N 23°13′E
- Country: Poland
- Voivodeship: Lublin
- County: Włodawa
- Gmina: Urszulin
- Time zone: UTC+1 (CET)
  - Summer (DST): UTC+2 (CEST)
- Vehicle registration: LWL

Wereszczyn ([vɛˈrɛʂt͡ʂɨn]) is a village in the administrative district of Gmina Urszulin, within Włodawa County, Lublin Voivodeship, in eastern Poland.

== History ==
Wereszczyn was the ancestral seat of the Wereszczyński noble family of Korczak coat of arms. Local nobleman Andrzej Wereszczyński was often visited by Polish Renaissance poet Mikołaj Rej.

In 1827, the village had a population of 293. In 1901, Aniela Dembowska, wife of Edward Dembowski, leader of the Polish Kraków uprising of 1846 against Austrian rule, was buried at the local cemetery.

Following the joint German-Soviet invasion of Poland, which started World War II in September 1939, the village was occupied by Germany until 1944. On the morning of 14 May 1942, Germans entered the village and murdered all Jewish residents. The story of that day is told by possibly the only survivor, Mariam Raz-Zunszajn. The village was small and the Jewish residents numbered between 100 and 300. They were murdered near a cemetery and their bodies placed in and around a disused well. Ukrainians thought to be communists were also murdered in other locations.

Today, there is no trace of the Jewish life in the village but for a lone memorial placed a few years ago by Raz-Zunszajn who was nine at the time of the massacre.
