= Bieleckie =

- Village
- Location within Poland
- Coordinates: 51°22′10″N 23°10′37″E
- Country: Poland
- Voivodeship: Lublin
- County: Włodawa
- Gmina: Urszulin
- Population: 30

Bieleckie [bjɛˈlɛt͡skʲɛ] is a village in the administrative district of Gmina Urszulin, within Włodawa County, Lublin Voivodeship, in eastern Poland.
