= Wołczyny =

- Village
- Location within Poland
- Coordinates: 51°26′N 23°39′E
- Country: Poland
- Voivodeship: Lublin
- County: Włodawa
- Gmina: Włodawa

Wołczyny [vɔu̯ˈt͡ʂɨnɨ] is a village in the administrative district of Gmina Włodawa, within Włodawa County, Lublin Voivodeship, in eastern Poland, close to the border with Ukraine.
