= Olszowo =

- Village
- Location within Poland
- Coordinates: 51°26′04″N 23°09′41″E
- Country: Poland
- Voivodeship: Lublin
- County: Włodawa
- Gmina: Urszulin

Olszowo [ɔlˈʂɔvɔ] is a village in the administrative district of Gmina Urszulin, within Włodawa County, Lublin Voivodeship, in eastern Poland.
