= Kalinówka, Włodawa County =

Kalinówka
- Village
- Location within Poland
- Coordinates: 51°20′37″N 23°14′23″E
- Country: Poland
- Voivodeship: Lublin
- County: Włodawa
- Gmina: Urszulin
- Population: 30

Kalinówka [kaliˈnufka] is a village in the administrative district of Gmina Urszulin, within Włodawa County, Lublin Voivodeship, in eastern Poland.
