= Mietułka =

- Settlement
- Location within Poland
- Coordinates: 51°27′50″N 23°16′13″E
- Country: Poland
- Voivodeship: Lublin
- County: Włodawa
- Gmina: Stary Brus

Mietułka [mjɛˈtuu̯ka] is a settlement in the administrative district of Gmina Stary Brus, within Włodawa County, Lublin Voivodeship, in eastern Poland.
