= Nowiny, Włodawa County =

Nowiny
- Village
- Location within Poland
- Coordinates: 51°29′N 23°14′E
- Country: Poland
- Voivodeship: Lublin
- County: Włodawa
- Gmina: Stary Brus

Nowiny [nɔˈvinɨ] is a village in the administrative district of Gmina Stary Brus, within Włodawa County, Lublin Voivodeship, in eastern Poland.

== Gallery ==
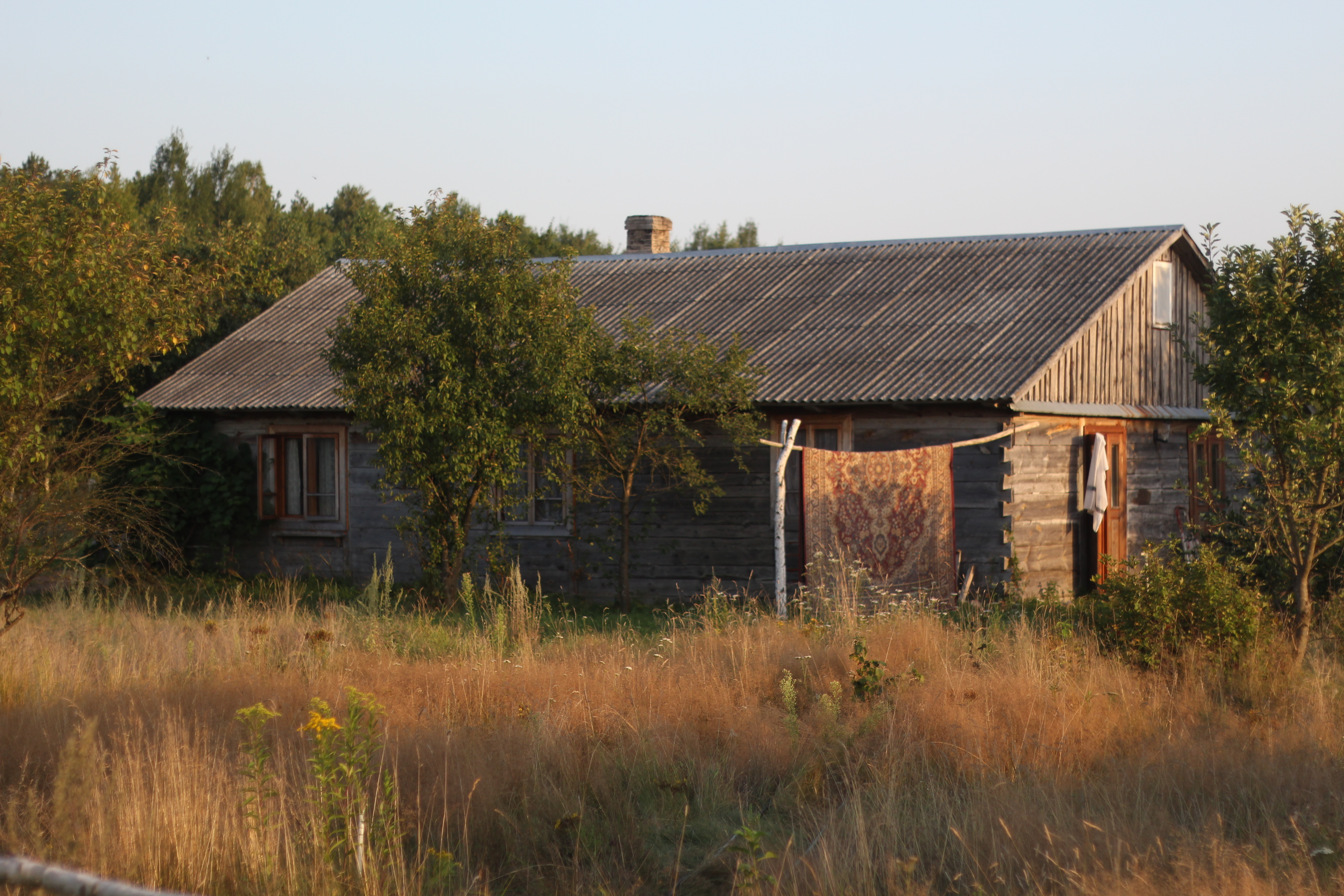

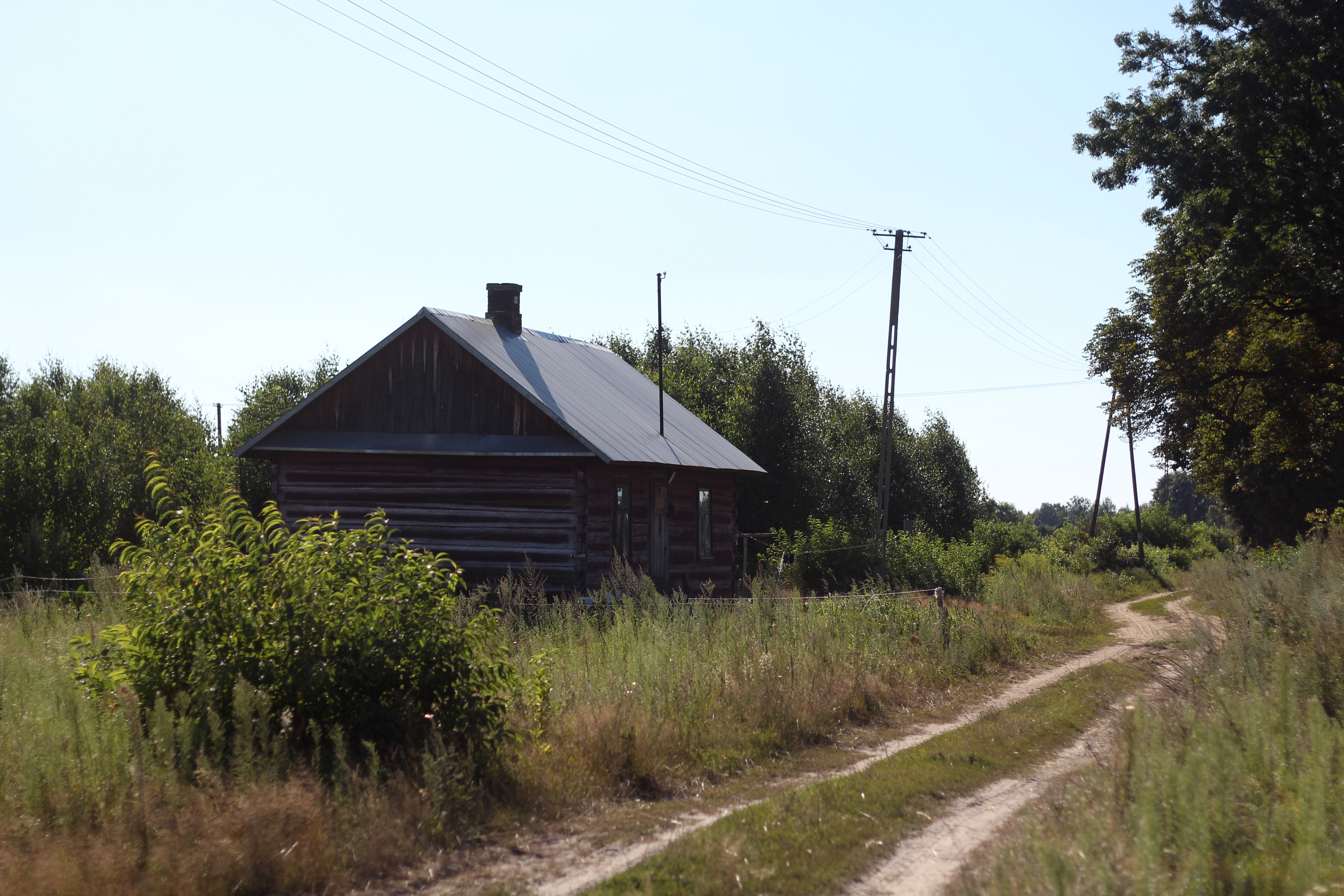

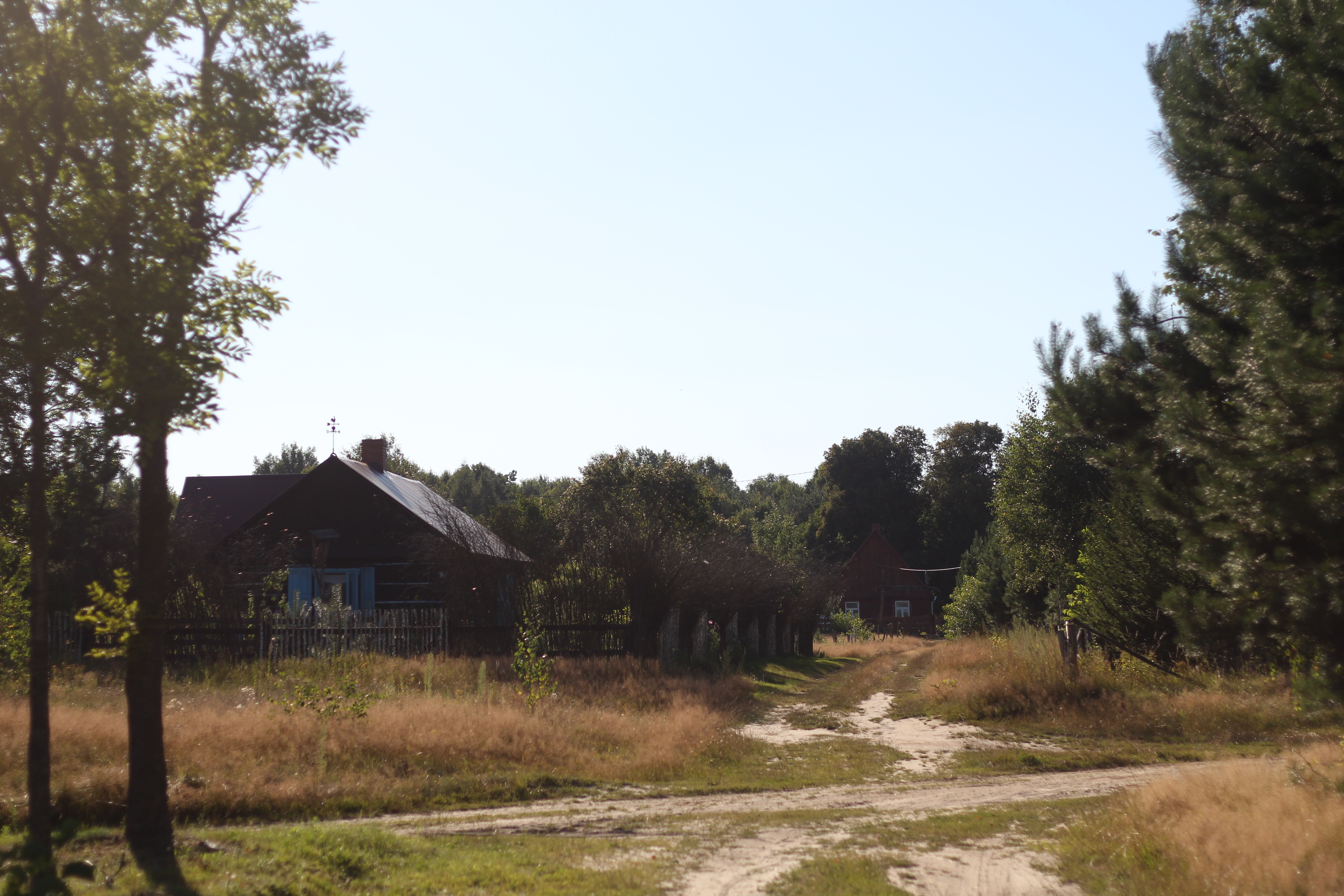

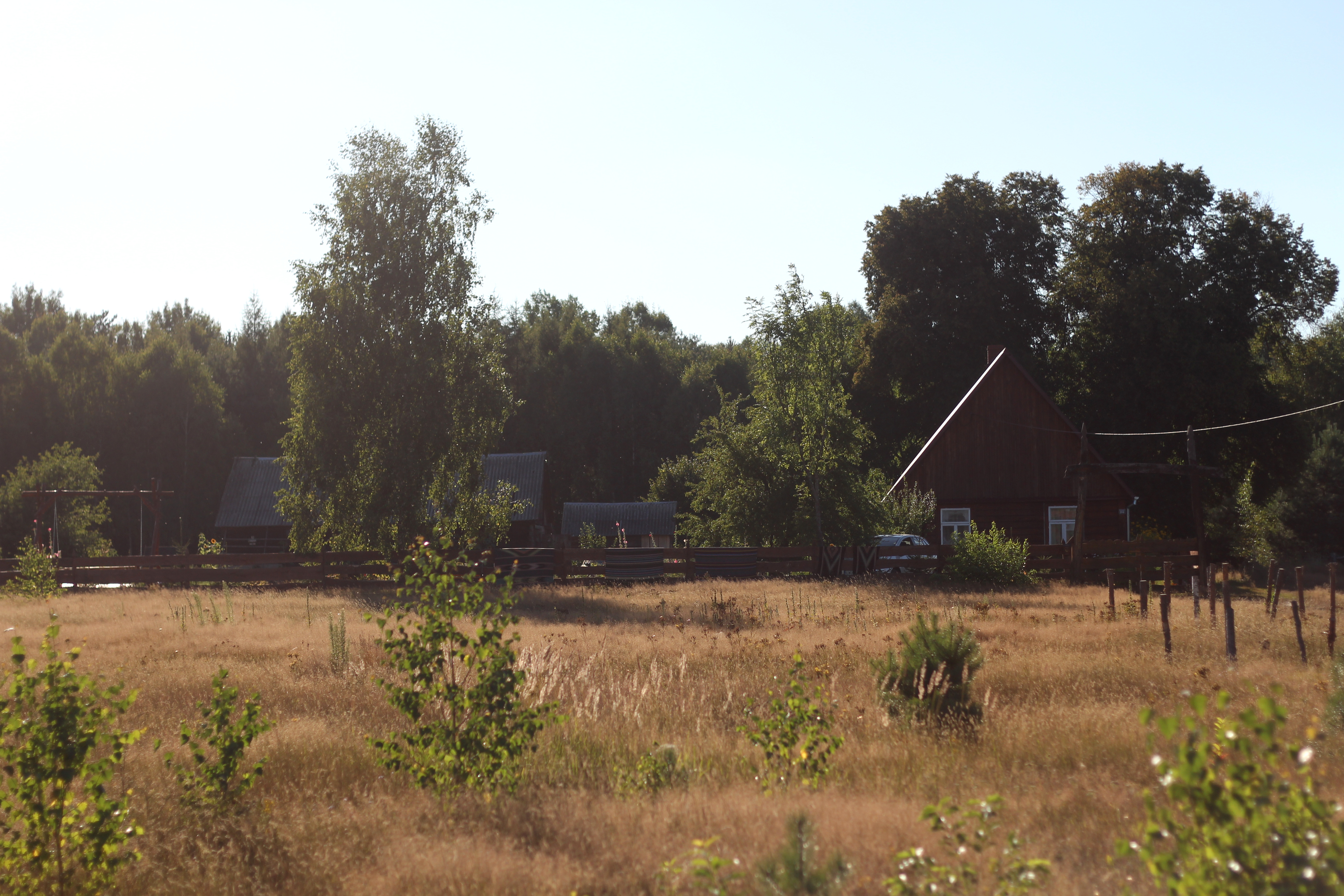

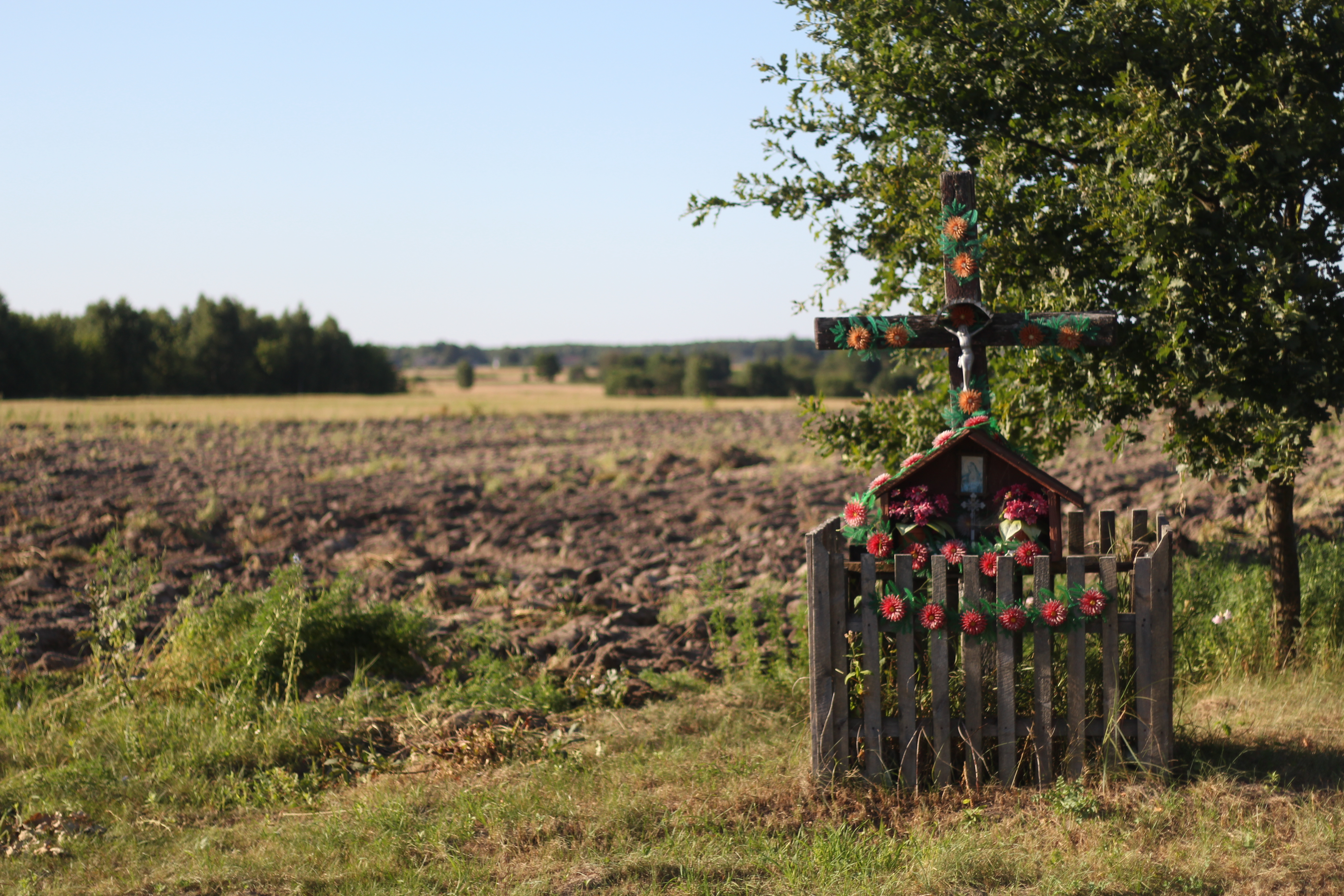
