= Wielki Łan =

- Village
- Location within Poland
- Coordinates: 51°28′58″N 23°12′19″E
- Country: Poland
- Voivodeship: Lublin
- County: Włodawa
- Gmina: Stary Brus

Wielki Łan (Polish pronunciation: [ˈvjɛlkʲi ˈwan]) is a village in the administrative district of Gmina Stary Brus, within Włodawa County, Lublin Voivodeship, in eastern Poland.
