= Stawki, Włodawa County =

Stawki
- Village
- Location within Poland
- Coordinates: 51°38′N 23°32′E
- Country: Poland
- Voivodeship: Lublin
- County: Wlodawa
- Gmina: Włodawa

Stawki [ˈstafki] is a village in the administrative district of Gmina Włodawa, within Włodawa County, Lublin Voivodeship, in eastern Poland, close to the border with Belarus.
