= Dyszczytno =

- Village
- Location within Poland
- Coordinates: 51°24′32″N 23°04′28″E
- Country: Poland
- Voivodeship: Lublin
- County: Włodawa
- Gmina: Urszulin

Dyszczytno [dɨʂˈt͡ʂɨtnɔ] is a village in the administrative district of Gmina Urszulin, within Włodawa County, Lublin Voivodeship, in eastern Poland.
