= Stare Stulno =

- Village
- Location within Poland
- Coordinates: 51°22′32″N 23°39′27″E
- Country: Poland
- Voivodeship: Lublin
- County: Włodawa
- Gmina: Wola Uhruska

Stare Stulno [ˈstarɛ ˈstulnɔ] is a village in the administrative district of Gmina Wola Uhruska, within Włodawa County, Lublin Voivodeship, in eastern Poland, close to the border with Ukraine.
