= Stanisławów, Włodawa County =

Stanisławów
- Village
- Location within Poland
- Coordinates: 51°19′N 23°36′E
- Country: Poland
- Voivodeship: Lublin
- County: Włodawa
- Gmina: Wola Uhruska

Stanisławów [staniˈswavuf] is a village in the administrative district of Gmina Wola Uhruska, within Włodawa County, Lublin Voivodeship, in eastern Poland, close to the border with Ukraine.
