= Polesie Landscape Park =

Protected area in Poland

Coordinates: 51.4494°N 23.2299°E

- Poleski Park Krajobrazowy
- IUCN category V (protected landscape/seascape)
- Interactive map of Polesie Landscape Park
- Location: Lublin Voivodeship
- Area: 51.13 km^{2} (19.74 sq mi)
- Established: 1983

Polesie Landscape Park (Poleski Park Krajobrazowy) is a protected area (Landscape Park) in eastern Poland, established in 1983, covering an area of 51.13 square kilometres (19.74 sq mi).

The Park lies within Lublin Voivodeship, in Włodawa County (Gmina Stary Brus, Gmina Urszulin). It forms part of the buffer zone of Polesie National Park, which was previously a part of it.
