= Łomnica, Lublin Voivodeship =

Łomnica
- Village
- Location within Poland
- Coordinates: 51°26′24″N 23°05′20″E
- Country: Poland
- Voivodeship: Lublin
- County: Włodawa
- Gmina: Urszulin

Łomnica [wɔmˈnit͡sa] is a village in the administrative district of Gmina Urszulin, within Włodawa County, Lublin Voivodeship, in eastern Poland.
