= Pieńki, Włodawa County =

Pieńki
- Village
- Location within Poland
- Coordinates: 51°33′1″N 23°13′52″E
- Country: Poland
- Voivodeship: Lublin
- County: Włodawa
- Gmina: Stary Brus

Pieńki [ˈpjɛɲki] is a village in the administrative district of Gmina Stary Brus, within Włodawa County, Lublin Voivodeship, in eastern Poland.
