= Okuninka =

- Village
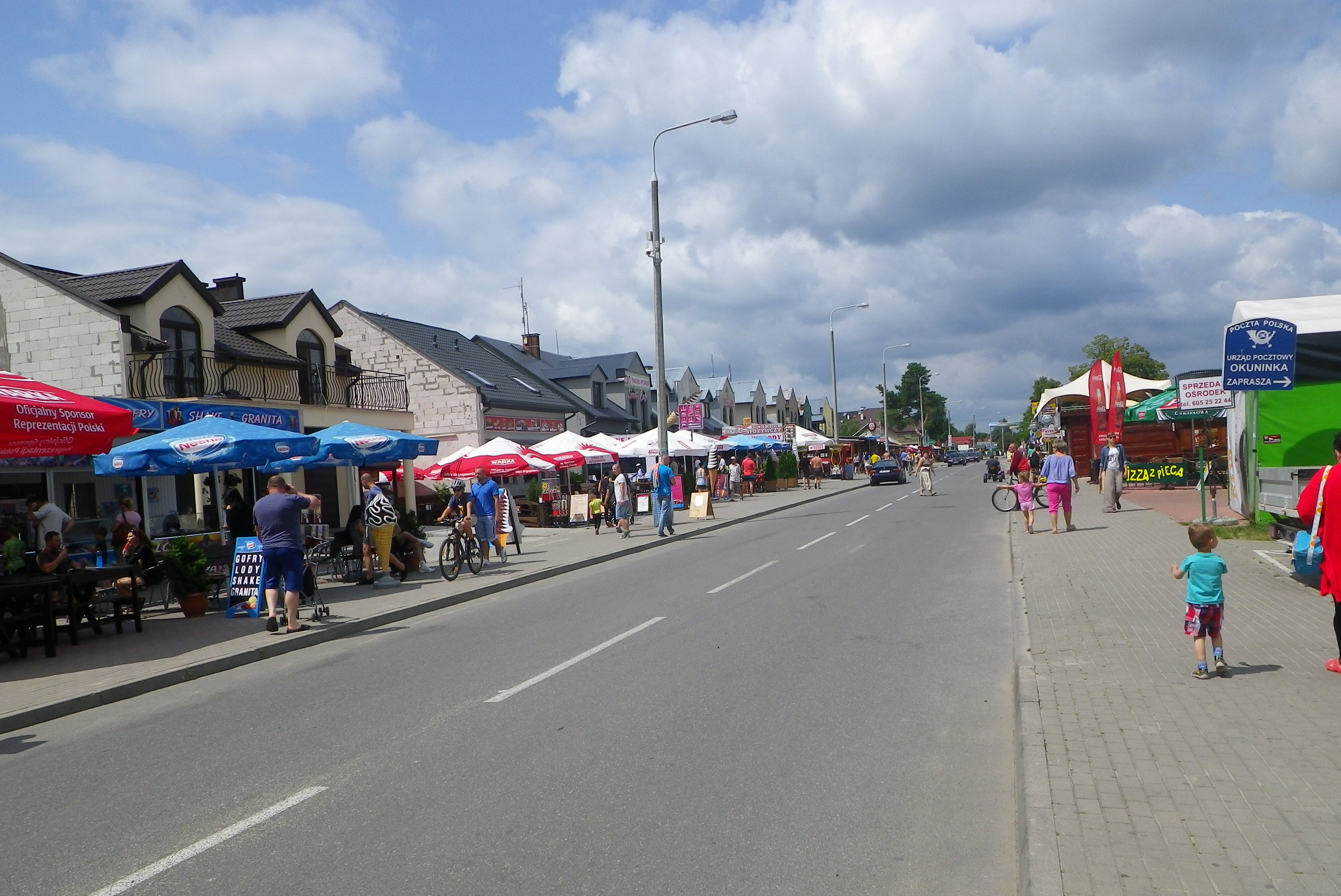
- Interactive map of Okuninka
- Location within Poland
- Coordinates: 51°30′6″N 23°32′26″E
- Country: Poland
- Voivodeship: Lublin
- County: Włodawa
- Gmina: Włodawa
- Population: 399
- Website: www.okuninka.pl

Okuninka [ɔkuˈniŋka] is a village in the administrative district of Gmina Włodawa, within Włodawa County, Lublin Voivodeship, in eastern Poland, close to the border with Belarus. It is located approximately 6 km (4 mi) south of Włodawa and 74 km (46 mi) north-east of the regional capital Lublin.

== History ==
Historically, the area of present-day Okuninka was part of the Włodawa estate. The village's modern development is closely tied to the post-war expansion of tourism in the Łęczna-Włodawa Lakeland. Initially an agricultural settlement, it gradually developed recreational infrastructure around the local lakes in the late 20th century.

The village serves as a host of accommodation services to tourists dispatched mainly from Lublin, including water-resort explorers, environmentalists, and families.

The lakeland area in between Łęczna and Włodawa is located near the national Route 82. Okuninka is well known in the region for topping events related to Białe Lake. It is a well-known center of agritourism, harbouring many venues around Okuninka, while the area that neighbors the middle of the Bug river valley (recognized as a part of NATURA2000 zone) remains accessible by a number of means, including kayaking.

=== Nature and conservation ===
The village is situated within the Łęczna-Włodawa Lakeland. The local Lake Białe is located within the protected zone of the Polesie Protected Landscape Area and the buffer zone of the Sobibór National Park, recognized for its riparian ecosystems and high water quality.

=== Tourism and infrastructure ===
Okuninka serves as a local center for water tourism due to its location on Białe Lake, which features recreational infrastructure, including marinas and designated bathing areas. The village is located on the Eastern Bicycle Trail (Wschodni Szlak Rowerowy Green Velo), a national cycling route that increases its accessibility for tourists in the Poland-Belarus borderland region. The local economy is supported by agritourism farms and seasonal hospitality services.
