= Przymiarki, Gmina Urszulin =

Przymiarki
- Village
- Location within Poland
- Coordinates: 51°19′52″N 23°14′13.5″E
- Country: Poland
- Voivodeship: Lublin
- County: Włodawa
- Gmina: Urszulin

Przymiarki [pʂɨˈmjarki] is a village in the administrative district of Gmina Urszulin, within Włodawa County, Lublin Voivodeship, in eastern Poland.
