= Michałów, Lublin Voivodeship =

Michałów
- Village
- Location within Poland
- Coordinates: 51°24′38″N 23°12′21″E
- Country: Poland
- Voivodeship: Lublin
- County: Włodawa
- Gmina: Urszulin

Michałów [miˈxawuf] is a village in the administrative district of Gmina Urszulin, within Włodawa County, Lublin Voivodeship, in eastern Poland.
