= Mszanna, Lublin Voivodeship =

Mszanna
- Village
- Location within Poland
- Coordinates: 51°20′N 23°32′E
- Country: Poland
- Voivodeship: Lublin
- County: Włodawa
- Gmina: Wola Uhruska

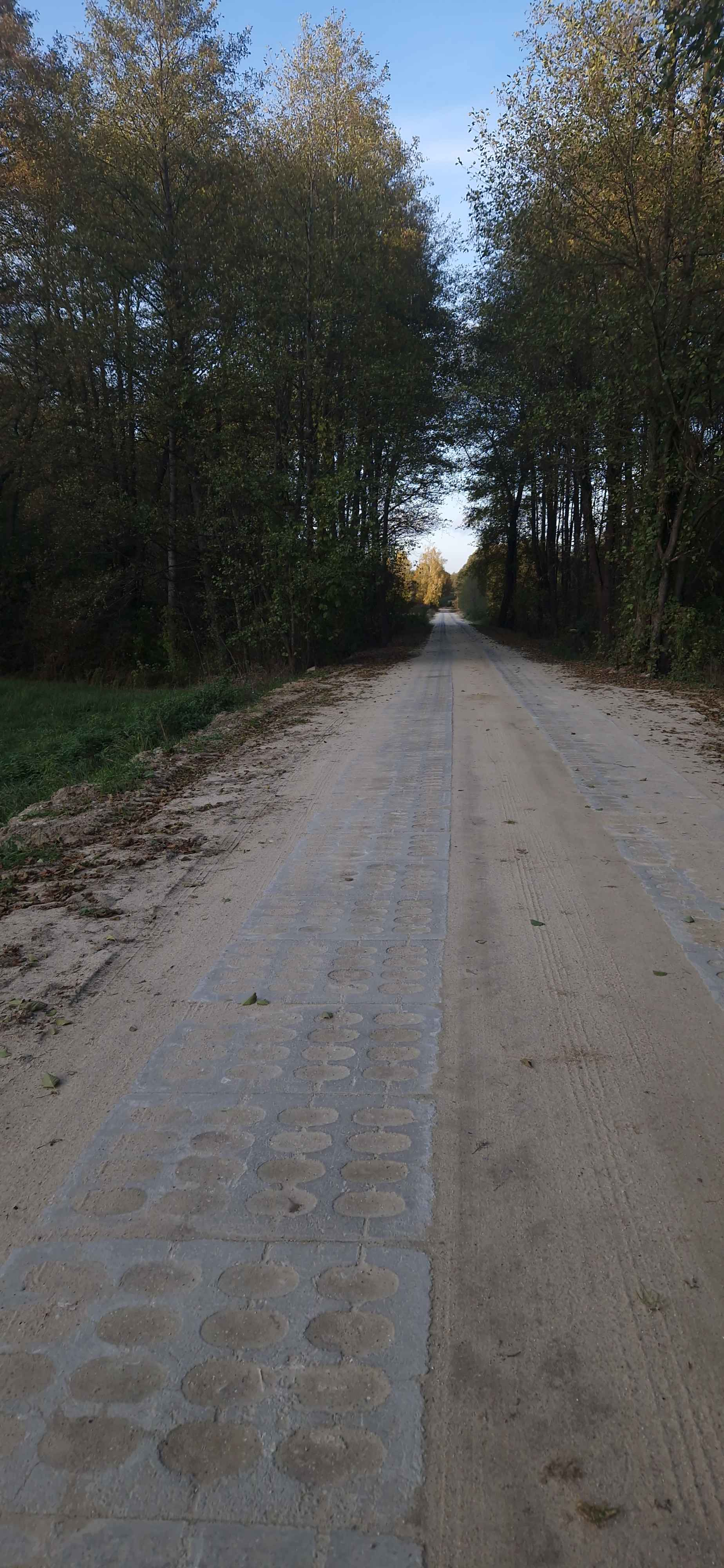
Road near the old school in the direction of DW819. This is one of the roads which were upgraded in the first half of 2024.

Mszanna [ˈmʂanna] is a village in the administrative district of Gmina Wola Uhruska, within Włodawa County, Lublin Voivodeship, in eastern Poland, close to the border with Ukraine.
