= Dębowiec, Włodawa County =

Dębowiec
- Village
- Location within Poland
- Coordinates: 51°23′N 23°10′E
- Country: Poland
- Voivodeship: Lublin
- County: Włodawa
- Gmina: Urszulin

Dębowiec [dɛmˈbɔvjɛt͡s] is a village in the administrative district of Gmina Urszulin, within Włodawa County, Lublin Voivodeship, in eastern Poland.
