= Dominiczyn =

- Village
- Location within Poland
- Coordinates: 51°27′N 23°18′E
- Country: Poland
- Voivodeship: Lublin
- County: Włodawa
- Gmina: Stary Brus

Dominiczyn [dɔmiˈnit͡ʂɨn] is a village in the administrative district of Gmina Stary Brus, within Włodawa County, Lublin Voivodeship, in eastern Poland.
