= Kołacze =

- Village
- Location within Poland
- Coordinates: 51°28′N 23°20′E
- Country: Poland
- Voivodeship: Lublin
- County: Włodawa
- Gmina: Stary Brus

Kołacze [kɔˈwat͡ʂɛ] is a village in the administrative district of Gmina Stary Brus, within Włodawa County, Lublin Voivodeship, in eastern Poland.
