= Gertruda Komorowska =

Polish noblewoman (1754-1771)

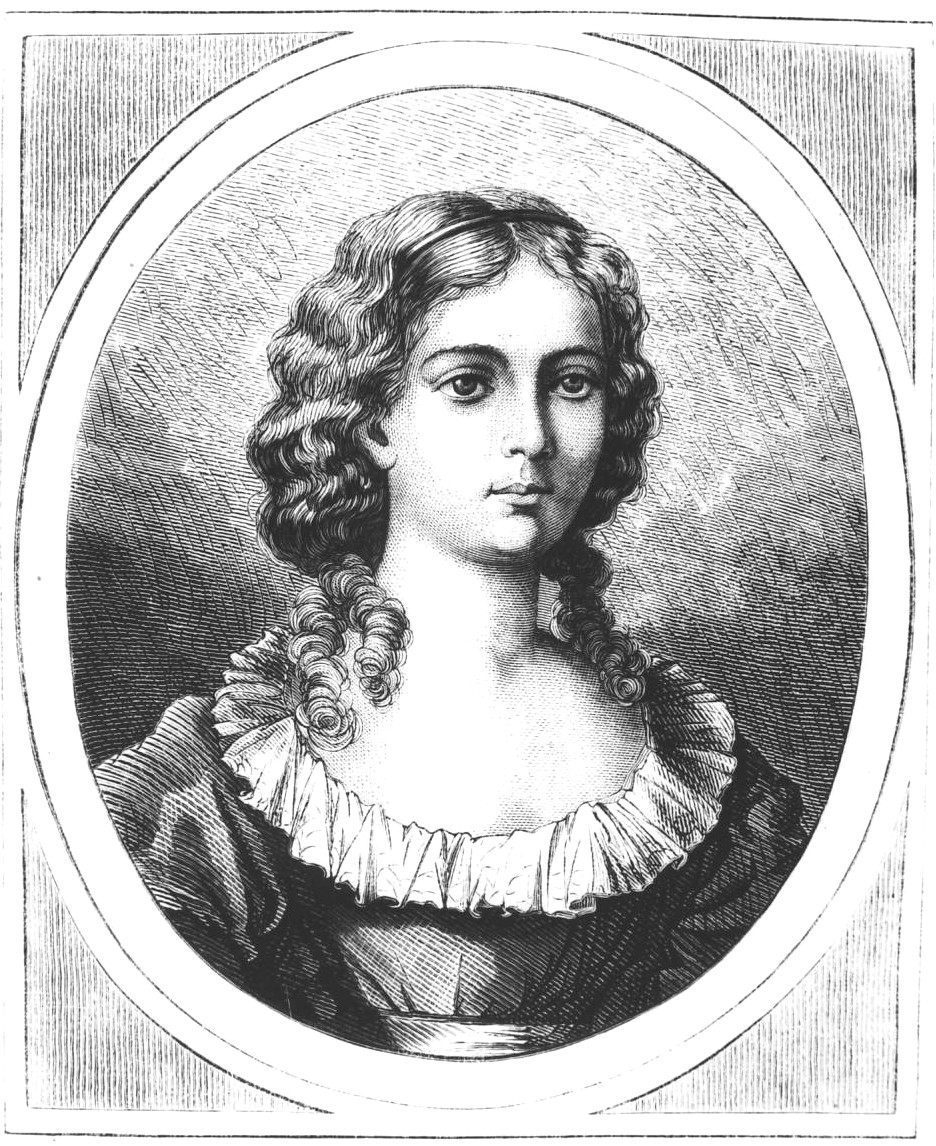
- Coat of arms: Korczak
- Born: Niestanice
- Died: 1771; Sielc Bełski
- Family: Komorowski
- Consort: Stanisław Szczęsny Potocki
- Father: Jakub Komorowski
- Mother: Antonina Pawłowska

Gertruda Komorowska (born 1754 in Suszno – 13 February 1771 in the river Rata near Sielec Bełski, Poland) was a Polish noblewoman, known the tragic circumstances of her marriage and death.

Daughter of Count Jakub Komorowski and Antonina Pawłowska, Gertruda Komorowska married Count Stanisław Szczęsny Potocki on 26 December 1770. The marriage was not arranged in accordance with custom, but was the result of an elopement, possibly following a secret love affair. Her father-in-law forced her spouse to initiate divorce proceedings and send her back to her family, who was to have her imprisoned in a convent for adultery. On her way home, however, she died in mysterious circumstances. Her life has been the subject of fictional portrayals.
