= Pod Bubnowem =

- Village
- Location within Poland
- Coordinates: 51°20′48″N 23°15′52″E
- Country: Poland
- Voivodeship: Lublin
- County: Włodawa
- Gmina: Urszulin

Pod Bubnowem [ˈpɔt bubˈnɔvɛm] is a village in the administrative district of Gmina Urszulin, within Włodawa County, Lublin Voivodeship, in eastern Poland.
