= Nowe Załucze =

- Village
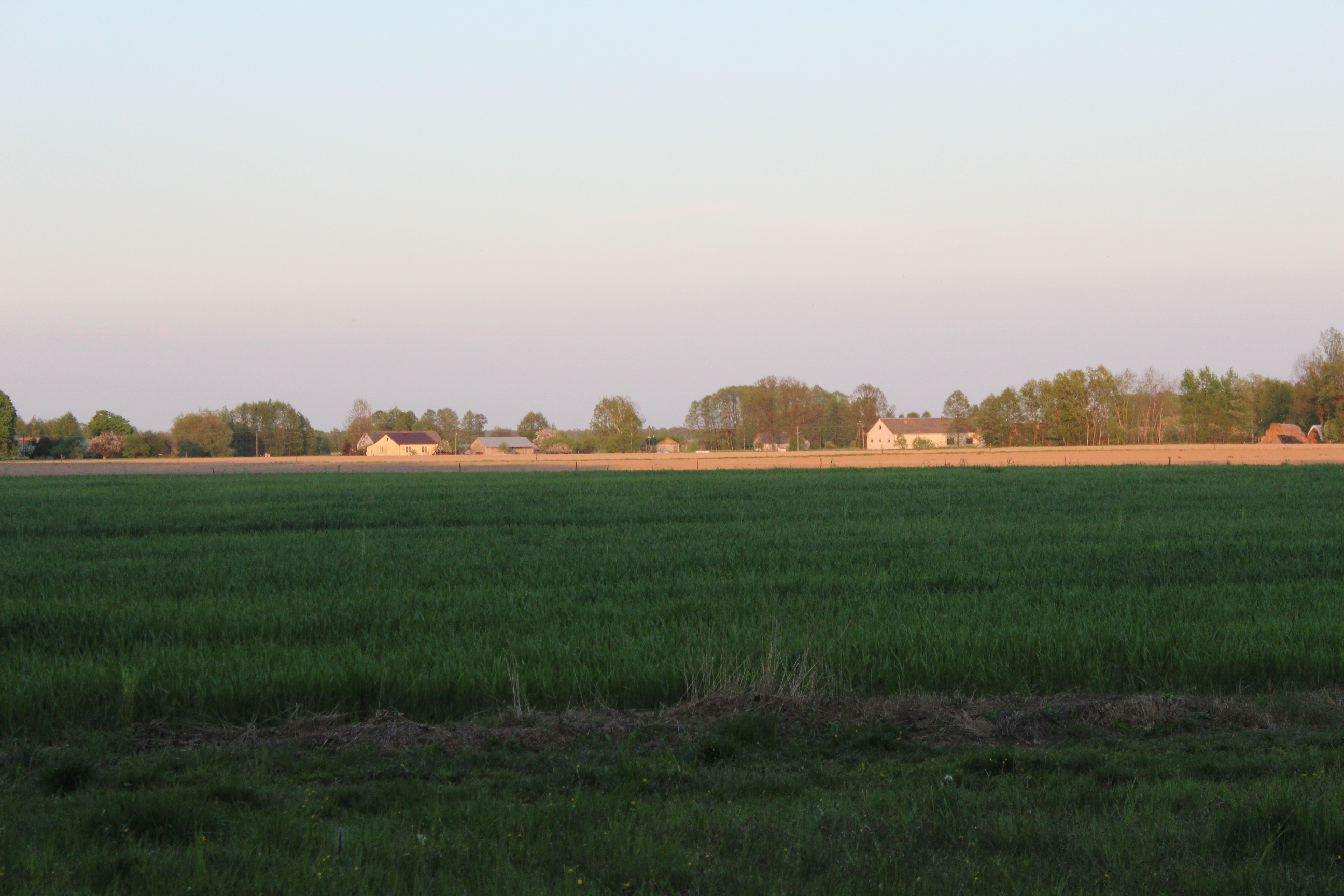
- Fields in Nowe Załucze

- Location within Poland
- Coordinates: 51°23′47″N 23°08′04″E
- Country: Poland
- Voivodeship: Lublin
- County: Włodawa
- Gmina: Urszulin

Nowe Załucze [ˈnɔvɛ zaˈwut͡ʂɛ] is a village in the administrative district of Gmina Urszulin, within Włodawa County, Lublin Voivodeship, in eastern Poland.
