= Stare Załucze =

- Village
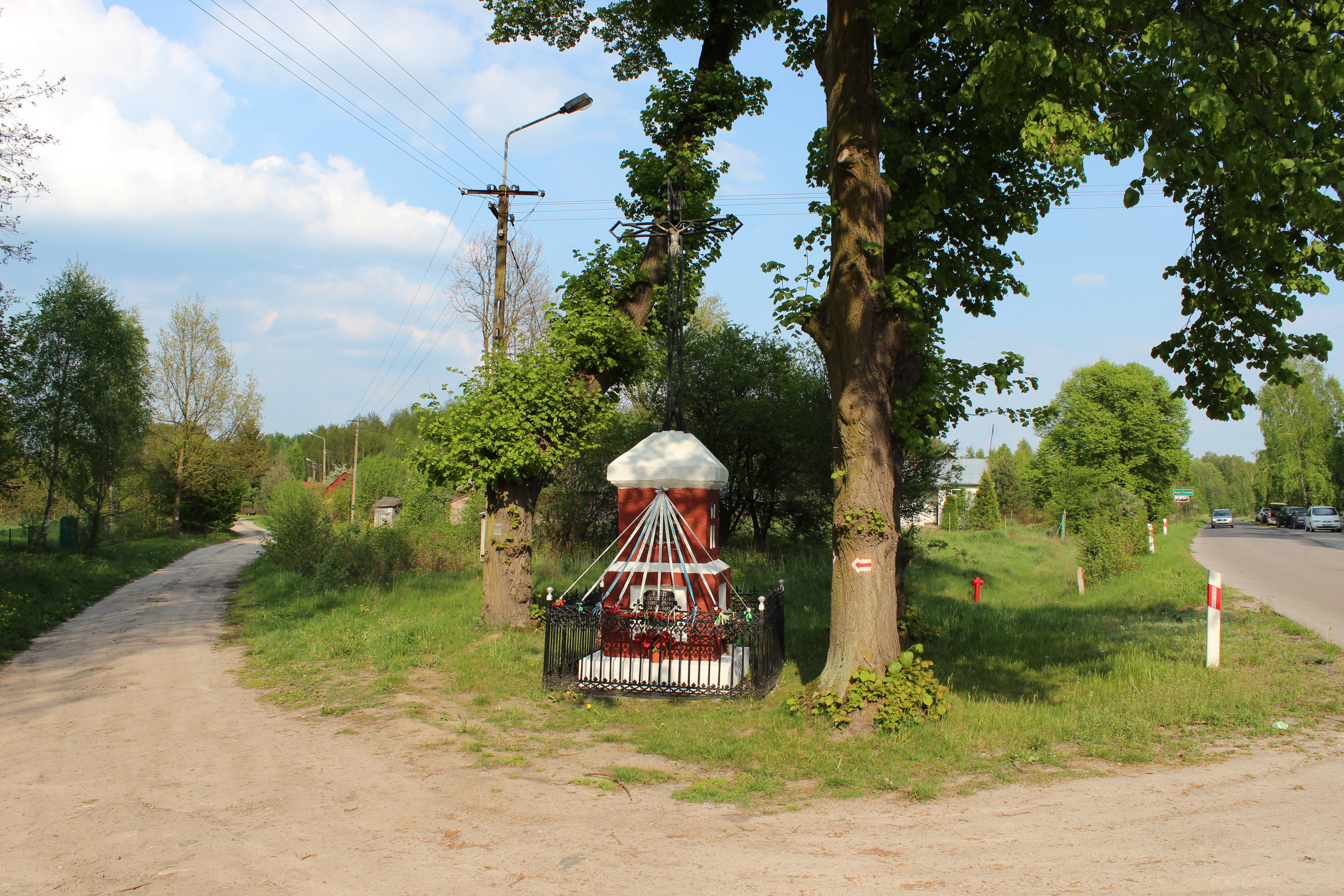

- Location within Poland
- Coordinates: 51°23′50″N 23°05′42″E
- Country: Poland
- Voivodeship: Lublin
- County: Włodawa
- Gmina: Urszulin
- Population: 170

Stare Załucze [ˈstarɛ zaˈwut͡ʂɛ] is a village in the administrative district of Gmina Urszulin, within Włodawa County, Lublin Voivodeship, in eastern Poland.
