= Żuków, Włodawa County =

Żuków
- Village
- Location within Poland
- Coordinates: 51°36′26″N 23°24′34″E
- Country: Poland
- Voivodeship: Lublin
- County: Włodawa
- Gmina: Włodawa
- Population: 354

Żuków [ˈʐukuf] is a village in the administrative district of Gmina Włodawa, within Włodawa County, Lublin Voivodeship, in eastern Poland, close to the border with Belarus.
