= Połód =

- Village
- Location within Poland
- Coordinates: 51°35′49″N 23°26′40″E
- Country: Poland
- Voivodeship: Lublin
- County: Włodawa
- Gmina: Włodawa

Połód [ˈpɔwut] is a village in the administrative district of Gmina Włodawa, within Włodawa County, Lublin Voivodeship, in eastern Poland, close to the border with Belarus.
