= Sołtysy =

Sołtysy may refer to the following places:

- Sołtysy, Lublin Voivodeship (east Poland)
- Sołtysy, Masovian Voivodeship (east-central Poland)
- Sołtysy, Opole Voivodeship (south-west Poland)
