= Zabrodzie, Lublin Voivodeship =

Zabrodzie
- Village
- Location within Poland
- Coordinates: 51°22′31″N 23°11′4″E
- Country: Poland
- Voivodeship: Lublin
- County: Włodawa
- Gmina: Urszulin

Zabrodzie [zaˈbrɔd͡ʑɛ] is a village in the administrative district of Gmina Urszulin, within Włodawa County, Lublin Voivodeship, in eastern Poland.
