= Wola Wereszczyńska =

- Village
- Location within Poland
- Coordinates: 51°26′N 23°8′E
- Country: Poland
- Voivodeship: Lublin
- County: Włodawa
- Gmina: Urszulin

Wola Wereszczyńska [ˈvɔla vɛrɛʂˈt͡ʂɨɲska] is a village in the administrative district of Gmina Urszulin, within Włodawa County, Lublin Voivodeship, in eastern Poland.
