= Marianka, Włodawa County =

Marianka
- Village
- Location within Poland
- Coordinates: 51°32′N 23°17′E
- Country: Poland
- Voivodeship: Lublin
- County: Włodawa
- Gmina: Stary Brus

Marianka [maˈrjaŋka] is a village in the administrative district of Gmina Stary Brus, within Włodawa County, Lublin Voivodeship, in eastern Poland.
