= Wujek =

Wujek (literally "uncle," in Polish) can refer to:

- Wujek Coal Mine, a mine where 9 workers were killed during a famous 1981 strike
- Jakub Wujek, a 16th-century Polish Jesuit who translated the Bible into Polish
- Wujek, Lublin Voivodeship, a village in east Poland
