= Przymiarki, Gmina Wola Uhruska =

Przymiarki
- Village
- Location within Poland
- Coordinates: 51°16′07″N 23°37′18″E
- Country: Poland
- Voivodeship: Lublin
- County: Włodawa
- Gmina: Wola Uhruska

Przymiarki [pʂɨˈmjarki] is a village in the administrative district of Gmina Wola Uhruska, within Włodawa County, Lublin Voivodeship, in eastern Poland, close to the border with Ukraine.
