= Wiązowiec, Lublin Voivodeship =

Wiązowiec
- Village
- Location within Poland
- Coordinates: 51°24′19″N 23°10′19″E
- Country: Poland
- Voivodeship: Lublin
- County: Włodawa
- Gmina: Urszulin
- Population: 210

Wiązowiec [vjɔ̃ˈzɔvjɛt͡s] is a village in the administrative district of Gmina Urszulin, within Włodawa County, Lublin Voivodeship, in eastern Poland.
