= Wólka Wytycka =

- Village
- Location within Poland
- Coordinates: 51°27′N 23°12′E
- Country: Poland
- Voivodeship: Lublin
- County: Włodawa
- Gmina: Urszulin

Wólka Wytycka [ˈvulka vɨˈtɨt͡ska] is a village in the administrative district of Gmina Urszulin, within Włodawa County, Lublin Voivodeship, in eastern Poland.
