= Zbereże =

- Village
- Location within Poland
- Coordinates: 51°24′N 23°41′E
- Country: Poland
- Voivodeship: Lublin
- County: Włodawa
- Gmina: Wola Uhruska
- Elevation: 167 m (548 ft)
- Website: http://www.ospzbereze.wlodawa.pl

Zbereże [zbɛˈrɛʐɛ] is a village in the administrative district of Gmina Wola Uhruska, within Włodawa County, Lublin Voivodeship, in eastern Poland, close to the border with Ukraine.
