= Korolówka-Kolonia =

- Village
- Location within Poland
- Coordinates: 51°34′05″N 23°30′24″E
- Country: Poland
- Voivodeship: Lublin
- County: Włodawa
- Gmina: Włodawa

Korolówka-Kolonia [kɔrɔˈlufka kɔˈlɔɲa] is a village in the administrative district of Gmina Włodawa, within Włodawa County, Lublin Voivodeship, in eastern Poland, close to the border with Belarus.
