= Różanka, Lublin Voivodeship =

Różanka
- Village
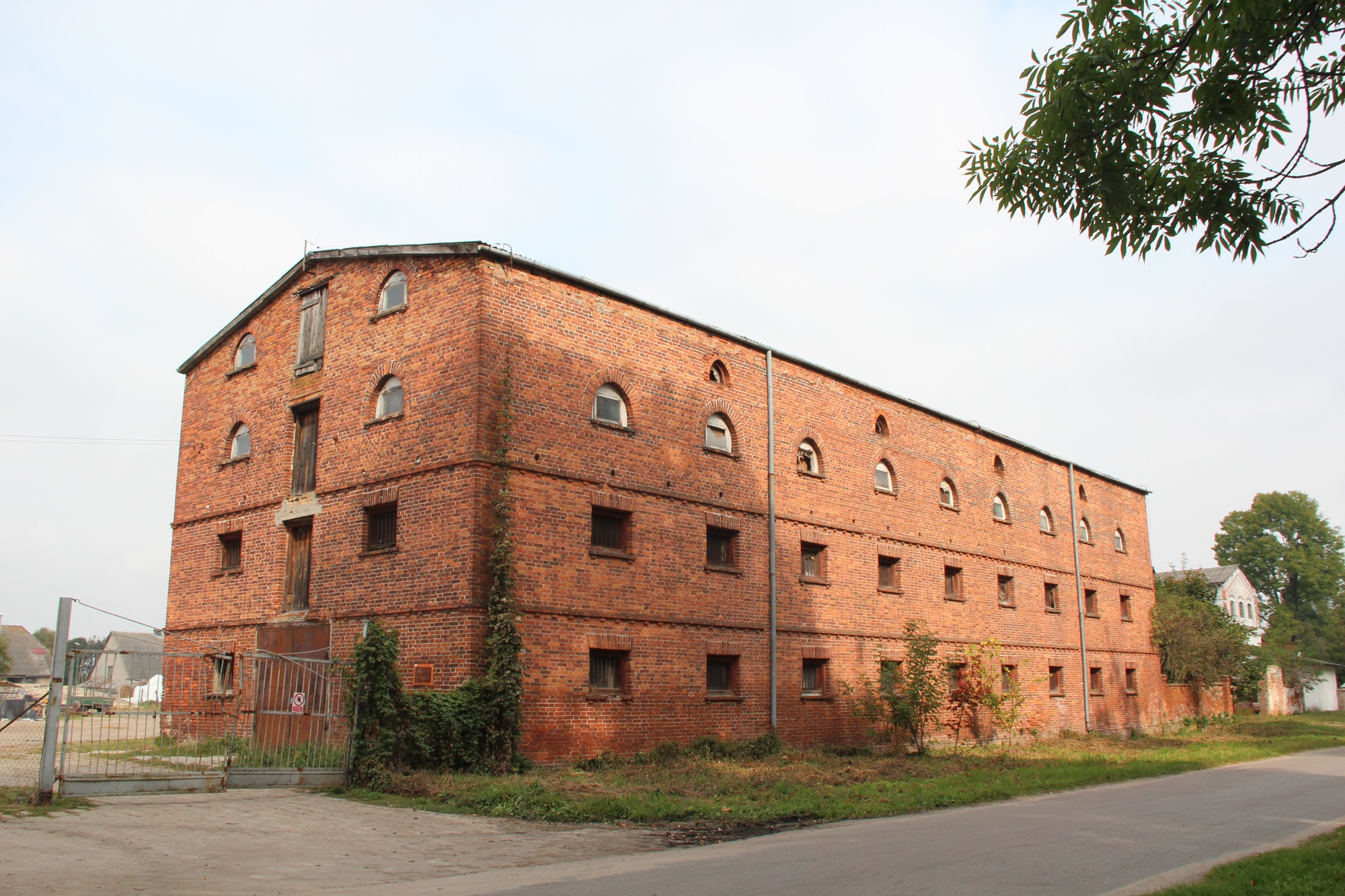
- Old granary in Różanka

- Location within Poland
- Coordinates: 51°37′N 23°32′E
- Country: Poland
- Voivodeship: Lublin
- County: Włodawa
- Gmina: Włodawa

Population
  - Total: 983
- Time zone: UTC+1 (CET)
  - Summer (DST): UTC+2 (CEST)
- Website: http://www.rozanka.gmina-wlodawa.pl/

Różanka [ruˈʐaŋka] is a village in the administrative district of Gmina Włodawa, within Włodawa County, Lublin Voivodeship, in eastern Poland, close to the border with Belarus.

== History ==
Seven people, including six Polish citizens, were murdered by Nazi Germany in the village during World War II.

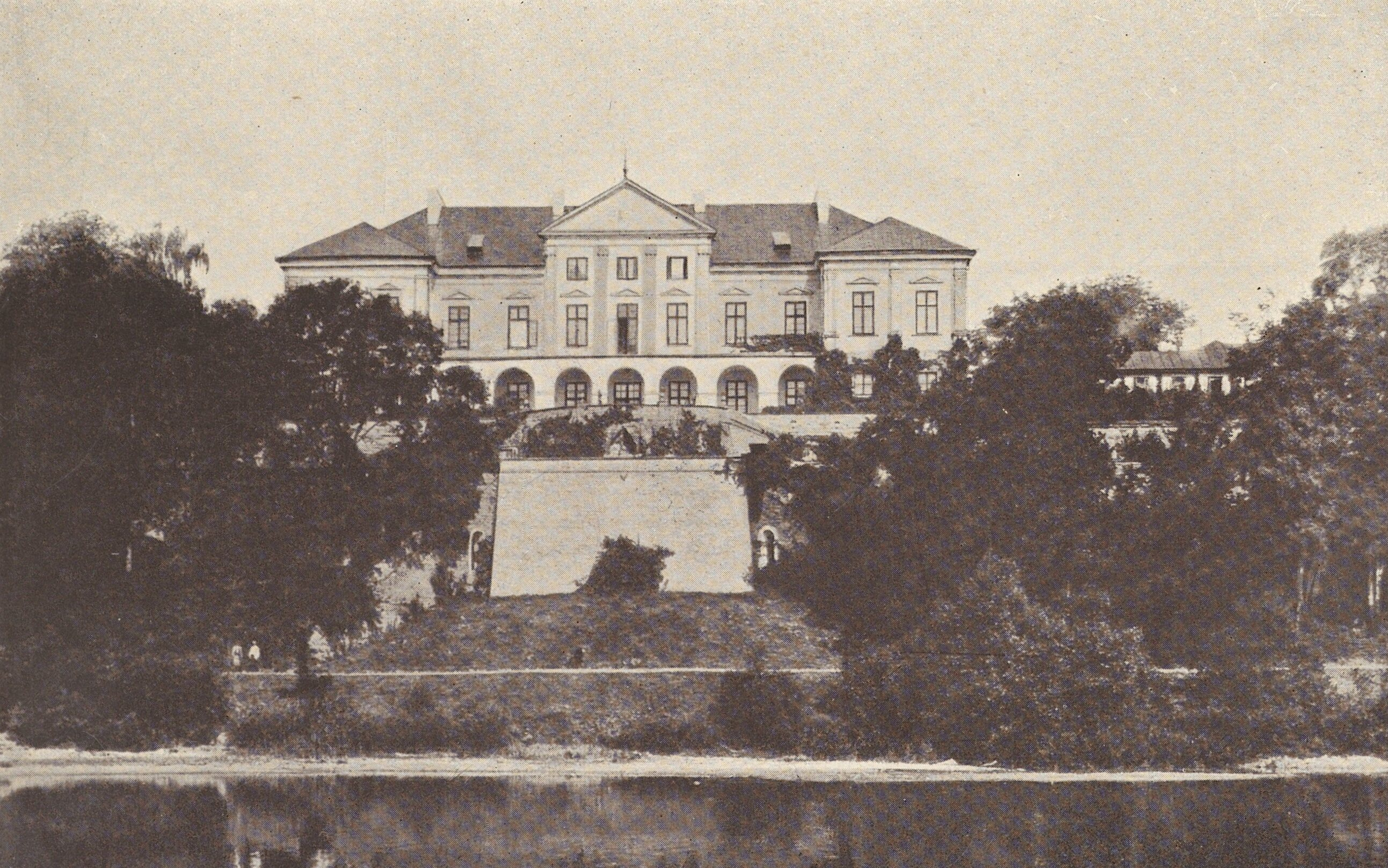
Palace before 1911

== Sport ==
The village is represented by the football club Eko Różanka.
