= Grabniak =

Grabniak may refer to the following places:

- Grabniak, Lublin Voivodeship (east Poland)
- Grabniak, Garwolin County in Masovian Voivodeship (east-central Poland)
- Grabniak, Mińsk County in Masovian Voivodeship (east-central Poland)
- Grabniak, Warmian-Masurian Voivodeship (north Poland)
