= Skorodnica =

- Village
- Location within Poland
- Coordinates: 51°31′N 23°19′E
- Country: Poland
- Voivodeship: Lublin
- County: Włodawa
- Gmina: Stary Brus
- Time zone: UTC+1 (CET)
  - Summer (DST): UTC+2 (CEST)

Skorodnica [skɔrɔdˈnit͡sa] is a village in the administrative district of Gmina Stary Brus, within Włodawa County, Lublin Voivodeship, in eastern Poland.

== History ==
19 Polish citizens were murdered by Nazi Germany in the village during World War II.
