= Kosyń, Lublin Voivodeship =

Kosyń
- Village
- Location within Poland
- Coordinates: 51°23′N 23°35′E
- Country: Poland
- Voivodeship: Lublin
- County: Włodawa
- Gmina: Wola Uhruska

Kosyń [ˈkɔsɨɲ] is a village in the administrative district of Gmina Wola Uhruska, within Włodawa County, Lublin Voivodeship, in eastern Poland, close to the border with Ukraine.
