= Wielkopole, Włodawa County =

Wielkopole
- Village
- Location within Poland
- Coordinates: 51°21′N 23°15′E
- Country: Poland
- Voivodeship: Lublin
- County: Włodawa
- Gmina: Urszulin

Wielkopole [vjɛlkɔˈpɔlɛ] is a village in the administrative district of Gmina Urszulin, within Włodawa County, Lublin Voivodeship, in eastern Poland.
