= Zastawie, Gmina Urszulin =

Zastawie
- Village
- Location within Poland
- Coordinates: 51°22′16″N 23°13′56″E
- Country: Poland
- Voivodeship: Lublin
- County: Włodawa
- Gmina: Urszulin

Zastawie [zasˈtavjɛ] is a village in the administrative district of Gmina Urszulin, within Włodawa County, Lublin Voivodeship, in eastern Poland.
