= Luta, Lublin Voivodeship =

Luta
- Village
- Location within Poland
- Coordinates: 51°28′N 23°29′E
- Country: Poland
- Voivodeship: Lublin
- County: Włodawa
- Gmina: Włodawa

Luta [ˈluta] is a village in the administrative district of Gmina Włodawa, within Włodawa County, Lublin Voivodeship, in eastern Poland, close to the border with Belarus.

== History ==
A small town situated a few miles outside Sobibor. The town was occupied by Germans in the spring of 1940. Luta was a forced labor camp for Jews that operated between 1940 and 1942 where hundreds of people were murdered.
