= Babsk, Lublin Voivodeship =

Babsk
- Village
- Location within Poland
- Coordinates: 51°25′33″N 23°7′52″E
- Country: Poland
- Voivodeship: Lublin
- County: Włodawa
- Gmina: Urszulin
- Time zone: UTC+1 (CET)
  - Summer (DST): UTC+2 (CEST)

Babsk [bapsk] is a village in the administrative district of Gmina Urszulin, within Włodawa County, Lublin Voivodeship, in eastern Poland.

== History ==
Three Polish citizens were murdered by Nazi Germany in the village during World War II.
