= Macoszyn Duży =

- Village
- Location within Poland
- Coordinates: 51°22′24″N 23°30′48″E
- Country: Poland
- Voivodeship: Lublin
- County: Włodawa
- Gmina: Wola Uhruska

Macoszyn Duży [maˈt͡sɔʂɨn ˈduʐɨ] is a village in the administrative district of Gmina Wola Uhruska, within Włodawa County, Lublin Voivodeship, in eastern Poland, close to the border with Ukraine. This village contains a school.
