= Józefów, Włodawa County =

Józefów
- Village
- Location within Poland
- Coordinates: 51°20′39″N 23°34′35″E
- Country: Poland
- Voivodeship: Lublin
- County: Włodawa
- Gmina: Wola Uhruska

Józefów (Polish pronunciation: [juˈzɛfuf]) is a village in the administrative district of Gmina Wola Uhruska, within Włodawa County, Lublin Voivodeship, in eastern Poland, close to the border with Ukraine.
