= Mszanna-Kolonia =

- Village
- Location within Poland
- Coordinates: 51°21′01″N 23°31′36″E
- Country: Poland
- Voivodeship: Lublin
- County: Włodawa
- Gmina: Wola Uhruska

Mszanna-Kolonia [ˈmʂanna kɔˈlɔɲa] is a village in the administrative district of Gmina Wola Uhruska, within Włodawa County, Lublin Voivodeship, in eastern Poland, close to the border with Ukraine.
