= Kandyba (surname) =

Kandyba (Ukrainian: Кандиба) is a Ukrainian surname associated with the noble Kandyba family. Notable people with te surname include:

- Fedir Kandyba (fl. 1629–1700), military and statesman of the Hetmanate of the 17th-18th centuries
- Ivan Kandyba
- Oleksandr Kandyba
- Piotr Kandyba (born 1969), Polish politician (M.P.), private business manager, and local government official
