= Wola Uhruska =

- Village
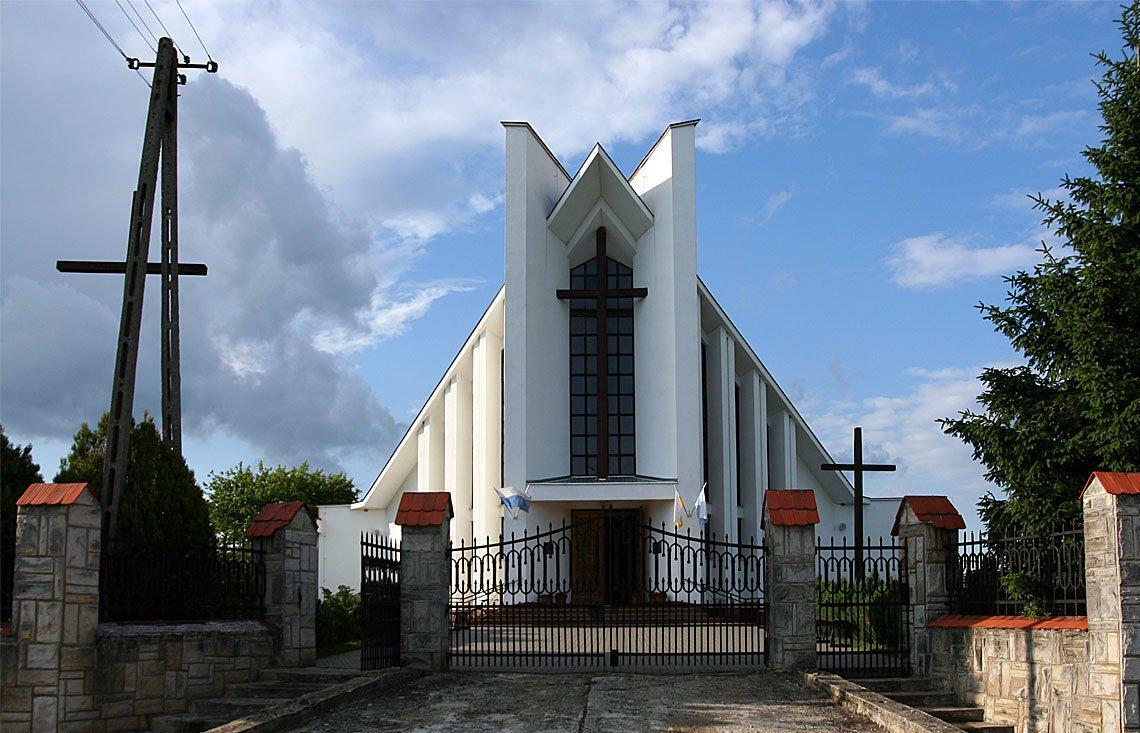
- Church of the Holy Spirit

- Location within Poland
- Coordinates: 51°19′N 23°38′E
- Country: Poland
- Voivodeship: Lublin
- County: Włodawa
- Gmina: Wola Uhruska

Wola Uhruska [ˈvɔla uˈxruska] is a village in Włodawa County, Lublin Voivodeship, in eastern Poland, close to the border with Ukraine. It is the seat of the gmina (administrative district) called Gmina Wola Uhruska. The river Bug runs to the east of the village, marking the Polish Border.

Wola Uhruska has recently had a few upgrades including the train station's surroundings renovated, a new fire station, and a formerly sand road surfaced with road markings, a pavement and signs.

The Straż Graniczna Nadbużański Oddział is stationed in the village.
