= Sołtysy, Lublin Voivodeship =

Sołtysy
- Village
- Location within Poland
- Coordinates: 51°22′49″N 23°34′30″E
- Country: Poland
- Voivodeship: Lublin
- County: Włodawa
- Gmina: Wola Uhruska

Sołtysy [sɔu̯ˈtɨsɨ] is a village in the administrative district of Gmina Wola Uhruska, within Włodawa County, Lublin Voivodeship, in eastern Poland, close to the border with Ukraine.
