= Stary Brus =

- Village
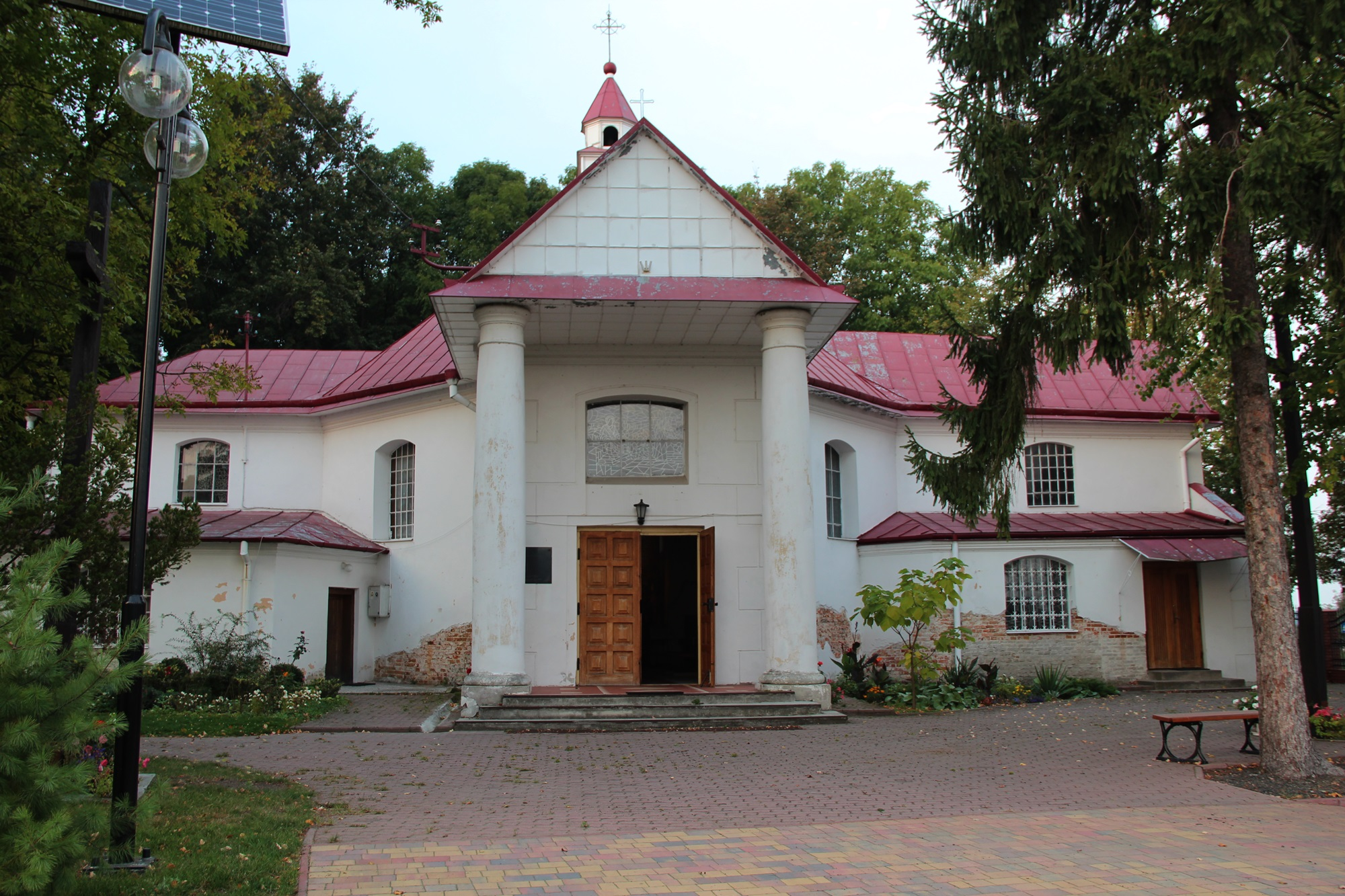
- Church of Our Lady of Częstochowa

- Location within Poland
- Coordinates: 51°28′55″N 23°17′21″E
- Country: Poland
- Voivodeship: Lublin
- County: Włodawa
- Gmina: Stary Brus

Stary Brus [ˈstarɨ ˈbrus] is a village in Włodawa County, Lublin Voivodeship, in eastern Poland. It is the seat of the gmina (administrative district) called Gmina Stary Brus.
