= Wujek, Lublin Voivodeship =

Wujek
- Village
- Location within Poland
- Coordinates: 51°25′32″N 23°06′17″E
- Country: Poland
- Voivodeship: Lublin
- County: Włodawa
- Gmina: Urszulin

Wujek [ˈvujɛk] is a village in the administrative district of Gmina Urszulin, within Włodawa County, Lublin Voivodeship, in eastern Poland.
