= Stulno =

- Village
- Location within Poland
- Coordinates: 51°23′N 23°37′E
- Country: Poland
- Voivodeship: Lublin
- County: Włodawa
- Gmina: Wola Uhruska

Stulno [ˈstulnɔ] is a village in the administrative district of Gmina Wola Uhruska, within Włodawa County, Lublin Voivodeship, in eastern Poland, close to the border with Ukraine.
