= Ivan Kandyba =

Ukrainian lawyer and human rights activist (1930–2002)

- Іван Кандиба
- Born: 7 June 1930; Stulno, Poland
- Died: 8 November 2002 (aged 72); Lviv, Ukraine
- Education: University of Lviv
- Organization: Ukrainian Helsinki Group
- Movement: Soviet dissidents
- Criminal charges: Anti-Soviet agitation, propaganda (1981)
- Penalty: Three years' imprisonment (1962); One year's imprisonment (1967); 10 years' corrective labour, five years' internal exile (1981)

Ivan Oleksiiovych Kandyba (Ukrainian: Іван Олексійович Кандиба; 7 June 1930 – 8 November 2002) was a Ukrainian lawyer, who achieved most fame by being a founding member of the Ukrainian Helsinki Group.

== Early life ==
Ivan Kandyba was born into a Ukrainian peasant family in a village of Stulno, Poland. In 1945, his family was forcefully resettled in the Ukrainian Soviet Socialist Republic as part of population exchange between Poland and Soviet Ukraine. Kandyba attended law school of Lviv University, graduating in 1953. Between 1953 and 1961, he worked in the city of Hlyniany, Lviv Oblast, as notary, lawyer, and judge.

== Political career ==
In February 1960, Kandyba met Levko Lukianenko, who was also working as a lawyer. The two became friends, and Kandyba supported an idea on which Lukyanenko was working - the creation of an illegal Ukrainian Worker's and Peasant's Union (UWPU) (Ukrainian: Українська Робітничо-Селянська Спілка, romanized: Ukrainska Robitnycho-Selianska Spilka). This organization was discovered, and Kandyba was arrested.

In 1962 and again in 1967, Kandyba served a three-year and one-year term respectively as a political prisoner. Upon his release in 1976, Kandyba was not allowed to work in Lviv.

== Ukrainian Helsinki Group ==
Kandyba was one of the founders of the Ukrainian Helsinki Group (UHG) which was announced in November 1976 by Mykola Rudenko.

Membership in the UHG carried a political and personal price. Kandyba was not allowed to practice in Lviv. After a trip to Moscow, to meet with members of the Moscow Helsinki Group, terms of Kandyba's release were tightened, for example he had to be home at 8:00pm rather than the original 9:00pm.

In 1978 and 1980, Kandyba tried to emigrate to the United States, but was not granted an exit visa by the Soviet authorities.

== Second arrest ==
On 24 March 1981, Kandyba was arrested for anti-Soviet agitation and propaganda. On 24 August 1981, he was sentenced to 10 years special punishment, and five years exile. He was incarcerated in the infamous VS-389/36-1 prison (Perm-36), where political prisoners from all over the Soviet Union were sent./He was labeled a repeat offender.

Because of his refusal to cooperate and insistence that he be acknowledged as a political prisoner, Kandyba was placed in isolation for 65 days on 1 January 1988.

On 5 September 1988, due to the call for his release by U.S. President Ronald Reagan, Kandyba was pardoned and released.

== Continued political career ==
In 1990, Kandyba created and became head of the political association "State Independence of Ukraine".

In 1993, Kandyba joined the Organization of Ukrainian Nationalists in Ukraine (opposition to the Organization of Ukrainian Nationalists), and continued to lobby for the legalization of that organization.

On 8 November 2002, Ivan Kandyba died in Lviv at the age of 72.
