= Gmina Urszulin =

Gmina Urszulin Urszulin Commune
- Gmina
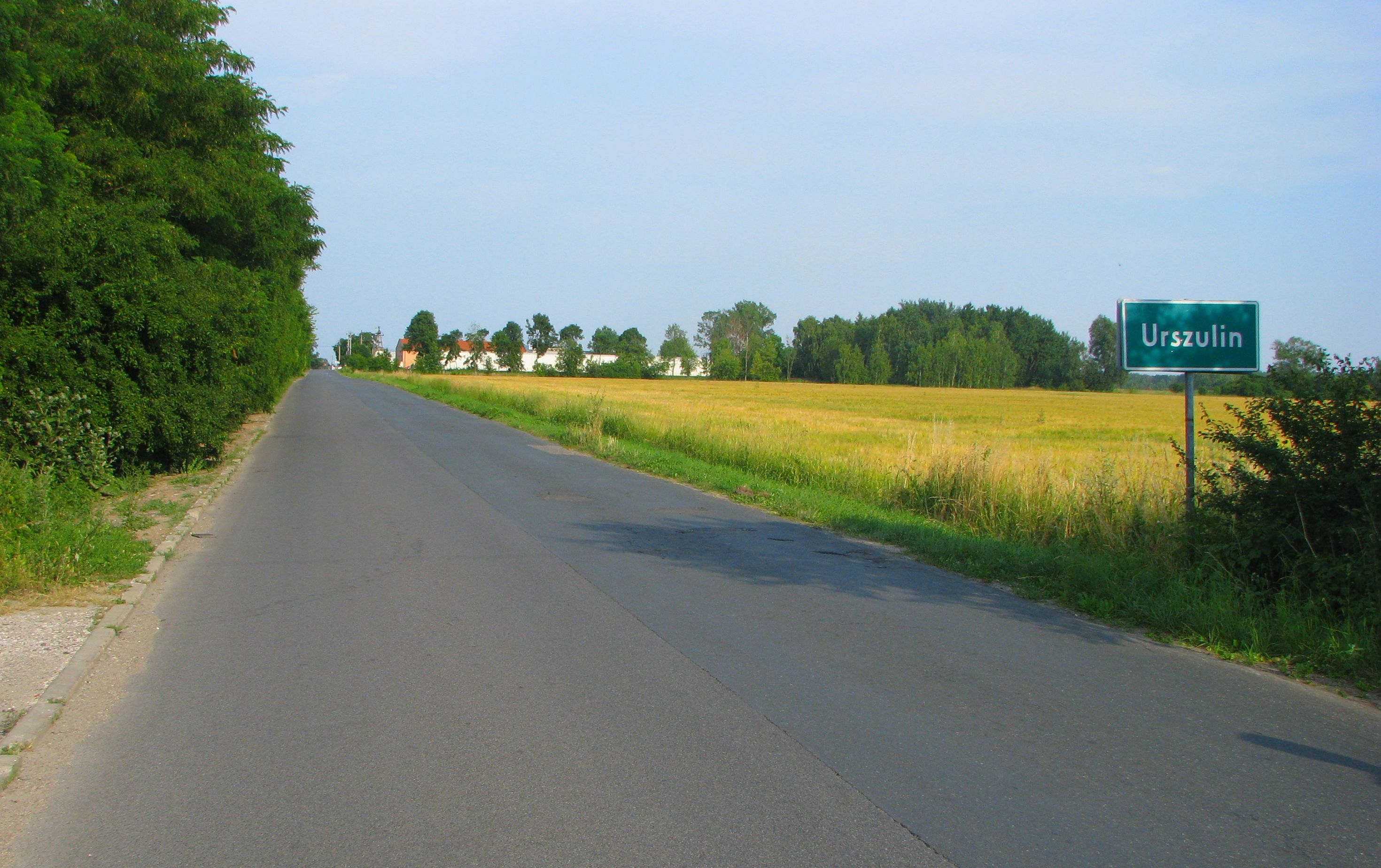
- Interactive map of Gmina Urszulin
- Coordinates (Urszulin): 51°23′39″N 23°11′4″E
- Country: Poland
- Voivodeship: Lublin
- County: Włodawa
- Seat: Urszulin

Area
  - Total: 171.62 km^{2} (66.26 sq mi)

Population (2006)
  - Total: 3,999
  - Density: 23.30/km^{2} (60.35/sq mi)
- Website: http://bip.urszulin.gelt.pl

Gmina Urszulin is a rural gmina (administrative district) in Włodawa County, Lublin Voivodeship, in eastern Poland. Its seat is the village of Urszulin, which lies approximately 31 kilometres (19 mi) south-west of Włodawa and 46 km (29 mi) east of the regional capital Lublin.

The gmina covers an area of 171.62 square kilometres (66.3 sq mi), and as of 2006 its total population is 3,999.

The gmina contains part of the protected area called Polesie Landscape Park.

== Villages ==
Gmina Urszulin contains the villages and settlements of Andrzejów, Babsk, Bieleckie, Borysik, Dębowiec, Dyszczytno, Grabniak, Grobelki, Jamniki, Kalinówka, Koło Młyna, Kozubata, Łomnica, Michałów, Nowe Załucze, Olszowo, Pod Bubnowem, Przymiarki, Sęków, Stare Załucze, Sumin, Urszulin, Wereszczyn, Wiązowiec, Wielkopole, Wincencin, Wola Wereszczyńska, Wólka Wytycka, Wujek, Wytyczno, Zabrodzie, Zarudka, Zastawie and Zawadówka.

== Neighbouring gminas ==
Gmina Urszulin is bordered by the gminas of Cyców, Hańsk, Ludwin, Sosnowica, Stary Brus and Wierzbica.
