= Grabniak, Lublin Voivodeship =

Grabniak
- Village
- Location within Poland
- Coordinates: 51°23′N 23°6′E
- Country: Poland
- Voivodeship: Lublin
- County: Włodawa
- Gmina: Urszulin
- Time zone: UTC+1 (CET)
  - Summer (DST): UTC+2 (CEST)

Grabniak [ˈɡrabɲak] is a village in the administrative district of Gmina Urszulin, within Włodawa County, Lublin Voivodeship, in eastern Poland.

== History ==
18 Polish citizens were murdered by Nazi Germany in the village during World War II.
