= Suszno =

- Village
- Interactive map of Suszno
- Location within Poland
- Coordinates: 51°35′N 23°33′E
- Country: Poland
- Voivodeship: Lublin
- County: Włodawa
- Gmina: Włodawa

Suszno [ˈsuʂnɔ] is a village in the administrative district of Gmina Włodawa, within Włodawa County, Lublin Voivodeship, in eastern Poland, close to the border with Belarus.
