= Gmina Stary Brus =

Gmina Stary Brus Stary Brus Commune
- Gmina
- Interactive map of Gmina Stary Brus
- Coordinates (Stary Brus): 51°28′55″N 23°17′21″E
- Country: Poland
- Voivodeship: Lublin
- County: Włodawa
- Seat: Stary Brus

Area
  - Total: 133.4 km^{2} (51.5 sq mi)

Population (2006)
  - Total: 2,202
  - Density: 16.51/km^{2} (42.75/sq mi)

Gmina Stary Brus is a rural gmina (administrative district) in Włodawa County, Lublin Voivodeship, in eastern Poland. Its seat is the village of Stary Brus, which lies approximately 20 kilometres (12 mi) south-west of Włodawa and 57 km (35 mi) north-east of the regional capital Lublin.

The gmina covers an area of 133.4 square kilometres (51.5 sq mi), and as of 2006 its total population is 2,202.

The gmina contains part of the protected area called Polesie Landscape Park.

== Villages ==
Gmina Stary Brus contains the villages and settlements of Dębina, Dominiczyn, Hola, Kamień, Kołacze, Kułaków, Laski Bruskie, Lubowierz, Marianka, Mietułka, Nowiny, Nowy Brus, Pieńki, Skorodnica, Stary Brus, Szmokotówka, Wielki Łan, Wołoskowola and Zamołodycze.

== Neighbouring gminas ==
Gmina Stary Brus is bordered by the gminas of Dębowa Kłoda, Hańsk, Sosnowica, Urszulin and Wyryki.
