= Urszulin, Włodawa County =

Urszulin
- Village
- Location within Poland
- Coordinates: 51°23′39″N 23°11′4″E
- Country: Poland
- Voivodeship: Lublin
- County: Włodawa
- Gmina: Urszulin
- Population: 800

Urszulin (Polish pronunciation: [urˈʂulin]) is a village in Włodawa County, Lublin Voivodeship, in eastern Poland. It is the seat of the gmina (administrative district) called Gmina Urszulin.

It is a legal address of Polesie National Park.
