= Gmina Wola Uhruska =

Gmina Wola Uhruska Wola Uhruska Commune
- Gmina
- Interactive map of Gmina Wola Uhruska
- Coordinates (Wola Uhruska): 51°19′N 23°38′E
- Country: Poland
- Voivodeship: Lublin
- County: Włodawa
- Seat: Wola Uhruska

Area
  - Total: 150.86 km^{2} (58.25 sq mi)

Population (2006)
  - Total: 4,170
  - Density: 27.6/km^{2} (71.6/sq mi)
- Website: http://www.wolauhruska.pl/

Gmina Wola Uhruska is a rural gmina (administrative district) in Włodawa County, Lublin Voivodeship, in eastern Poland, on the border with Ukraine. Its seat is the village of Wola Uhruska, which lies approximately 27 kilometres (17 mi) south of Włodawa and 75 km (47 mi) east of the regional capital Lublin.

The gmina covers an area of 150.86 square kilometres (58.2 sq mi), and as of 2006 its total population is 4,170.

== Villages ==
Gmina Wola Uhruska contains the villages and settlements of:

- Bytyń
- Huta
- Józefów
- Kosyń
- Łan
- Macoszyn Duży
- Majdan Stuleński
- Małoziemce
- Mszanka
- Mszanna
- Mszanna-Kolonia
- Nadbużanka
- Piaski
- Piaski Uhruskie
- Potoki
- Przymiarki
- Siedliszcze
- Sołtysy
- Stanisławów
- Stare Stulno
- Stulno
- Uhrusk
- Wola Uhruska
- Zagóra
- Zastawie
- Zbereże

== Neighbouring gminas ==
Gmina Wola Uhruska is bordered by the gminas of Hańsk, Ruda-Huta, Sawin and Włodawa. It also borders Ukraine.
