= Gmina Włodawa =

Gmina Włodawa Włodawa Commune
- Gmina
- Interactive map of Gmina Włodawa
- Coordinates (Włodawa): 51°33′N 23°33′E
- Country: Poland
- Voivodeship: Lublin
- County: Włodawa
- Seat: Włodawa

Area
  - Total: 243.75 km^{2} (94.11 sq mi)

Population (2006)
  - Total: 5,936
  - Density: 24.35/km^{2} (63.07/sq mi)
- Website: http://www.gmina-wlodawa.pl/

Gmina Włodawa is a rural gmina (administrative district) in Włodawa County, Lublin Voivodeship, in eastern Poland, on the border with Belarus and Ukraine. Its seat is the town of Włodawa, although the town is not part of the territory of the gmina.

The gmina covers an area of 243.75 square kilometres (94.1 sq mi), and as of 2006 its total population is 5,936.

== Villages ==
Gmina Włodawa contains the villages and settlements of Korolówka, Korolówka-Kolonia, Korolówka-Osada, Krasówka, Luta, Okuninka, Orchówek, Połód, Różanka, Sobibór, Stawki, Suszno, Szuminka, Wołczyny, Żłobek Duży, Żłobek Mały and Żuków.

== Neighbouring gminas ==
Gmina Włodawa is bordered by the town of Włodawa and by the gminas of Hanna, Hańsk, Wola Uhruska and Wyryki. It also borders Belarus and Ukraine.

== See also ==
- Sobibor extermination camp
