= Polesian National Park =

National park in Poland

- Poleski Park Narodowy
- IUCN category II (national park)
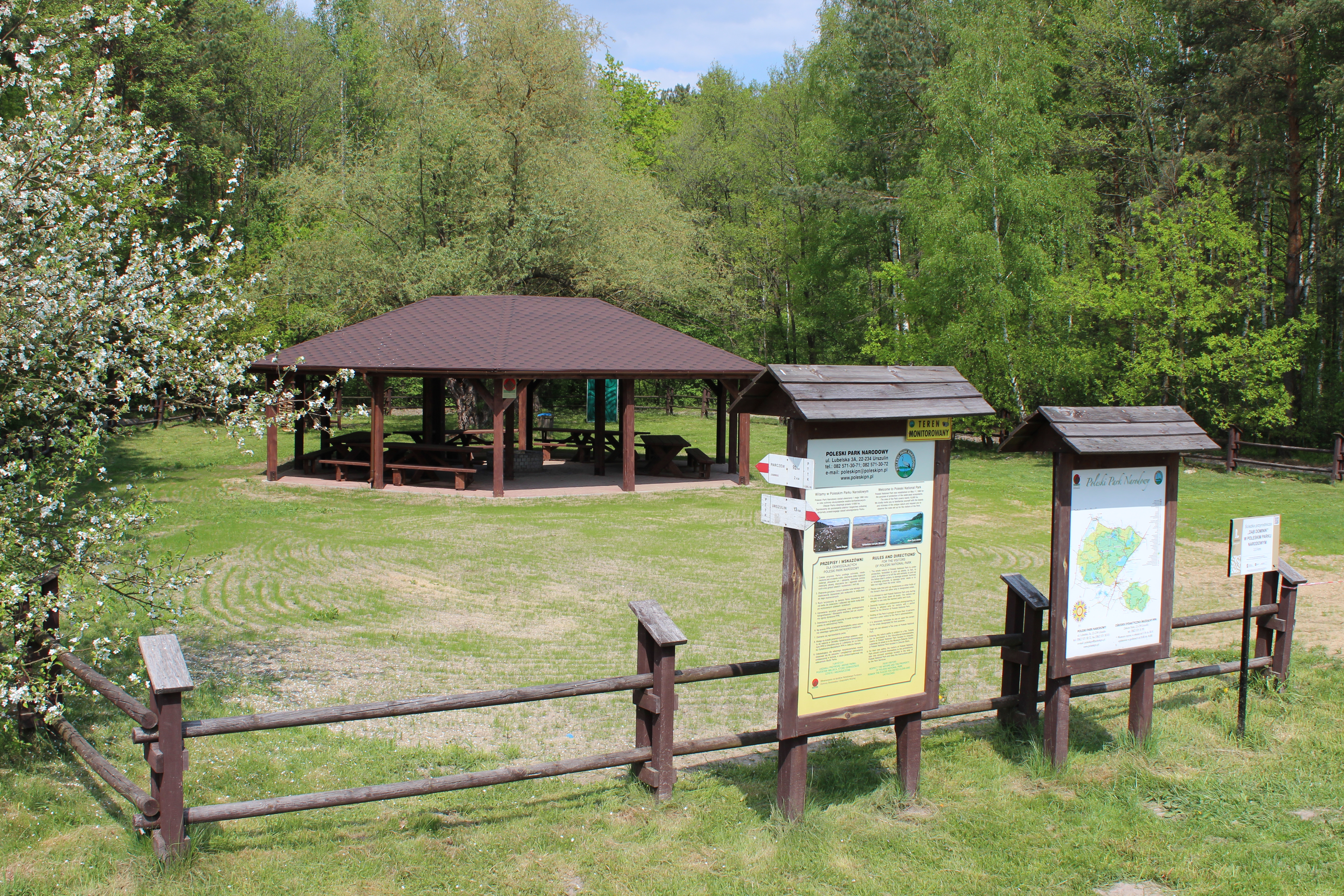
- Dominik Trail in Polesie National Park Park logo

- Location within Poland
- Location: Lublin Voivodeship, Poland
- Nearest city: Urszulin
- Coordinates: 51°16′N 23°05′E
- Area: 97.62 km^{2} (37.69 sq mi)
- Established: 1990
- Governing body: Ministry of the Environment
- Website: Official website

Ramsar Wetland
- Official name: Poleski National Park
- Designated: 29 October 2002
- Reference no.: 1565

Polesian National Park or Polesie National Park (Polish: Poleski Park Narodowy) is a National Park in Lublin Voivodeship, eastern Poland, in the Polish part of the historical region of Polesia. Created in 1990 over an area of 48.13 square kilometres, it covers a number of former peat-bog preserves: Durne Marsh (Durne Bagno), Moszne Lake (Jezioro Moszne), Długie Lake (Jezioro Długie), Orłowskie Peatland (Torfowisko Orłowskie). In 1994 its size was augmented by the addition of Bubnów Marsh (Bagno Bubnów), a swampy terrain adjacent to the park. Currently, the park occupies 97.62 km^{2} (37.69 sq mi), of which forests make up 47.8 km^{2}, and water and wastelands 20.9 km^{2}.

The idea of creating a national park in the Polish part of Polesie first appeared in 1959. Over the following years a few preserves were organized here, and in 1982 the government announced the creation of Poleski Park Krajobrazowy (Polesie Landscape Park). Currently, even though Polesie's infrastructure is quite well developed, it is rarely visited by tourists.

The national park and neighbouring areas form the West Polesie biosphere reserve, designated by UNESCO in 2002. The Shatsky National Natural Park is adjacent on the Ukrainian side of the border. The Park is also protected under the Ramsar convention as an important wetland site.

== World War II history ==
After the invasion of Poland, Nazi Germany planned to set up a "Jewish reservation" in the area of today's Polesie National Park known for its swampy nature. Adolf Eichmann was assigned the task of removing all Jews from Germany, Austria, and the Protectorate of Bohemia and Moravia to this reservation. The first short-term plan to be implemented was to concentrate the Jews around Nisko. Deportations began in October 1939. The "Nisko Plan" initially intended to remove 80,000 Jews from the so-called Greater German Reich, was scrapped in April 1940. By that time 95,000 Jews chiefly from Poland were already deported to this area. They were pressed to work in the RSHA camps of Generalplan Ost. By mid-October however, the idea of a "Jewish reservation" was revived. Resettlement actions connected to this plan continued until January 1941 under Globocnik, and included both Jews and Poles. Some 51 camps were created, but further plans of deporting up to 600,000 additional Jews to the Lublin reservation failed because of logistical factors. Notably, in less than two years the whole district would lend itself to the industrialized murder of hundreds of thousands of Jews during Operation Reinhard.

== Geography ==
The park lies on the Łęczna-Włodawa Lakeland (Pojezierze Łęczyńsko-Włodawskie). In the south it borders the Lublin Upland, in the north the region of Podlaskie, and in the west Masovia. Parts of its forests can be considered as tundra-like, which is unique in continental Europe and characteristic of Russian Siberia. The park's terrain is flat, with numerous lakes and peat-bogs.

== Ecology ==
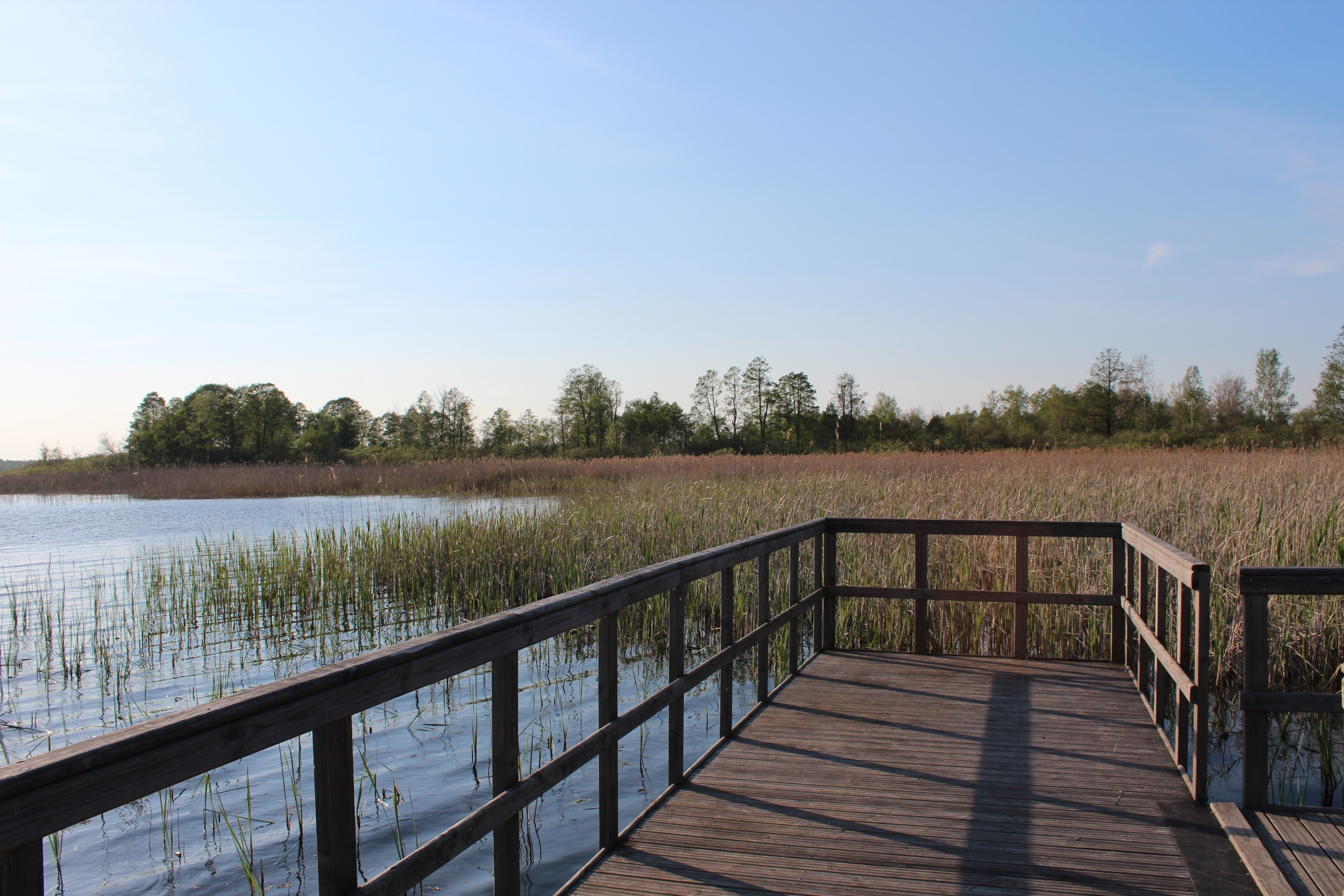
Łukie lake, with Spławy Trail

Of the plant species, the greater part is made up of boreal plants, typical of other parts of northern Europe, but there is also some Atlantic flora, as it lies on the border of these important plant regions. The region which is particularly rich with flora is the Bagno Bubnów. Animal life is abundant, including 21 species of fish, 12 species of amphibians, 6 species of reptiles and up to 150 species of birds (including several endangered eagles). Out of 35 species of mammals, one can point out Eurasian otters, elks, Eurasian beavers and bats.

The ecosystems of swamps and peat-bogs, which dominate the park's landscape, are considered very delicate and can easily be influenced by several outside factors. Some unfortunate changes were made by draining swamps, which took place mainly during World War II, when the area became the focus of the Nazi German "Lublin und Nisko Plan". However, the most important threat to the life of the park is its proximity to the Lublin Coal Basin, which is located less than 2 kilometers from the park's protective zone.

The park includes an endangered Important Bird Area "Bubnow Marsh" of Poland.

== Culture ==
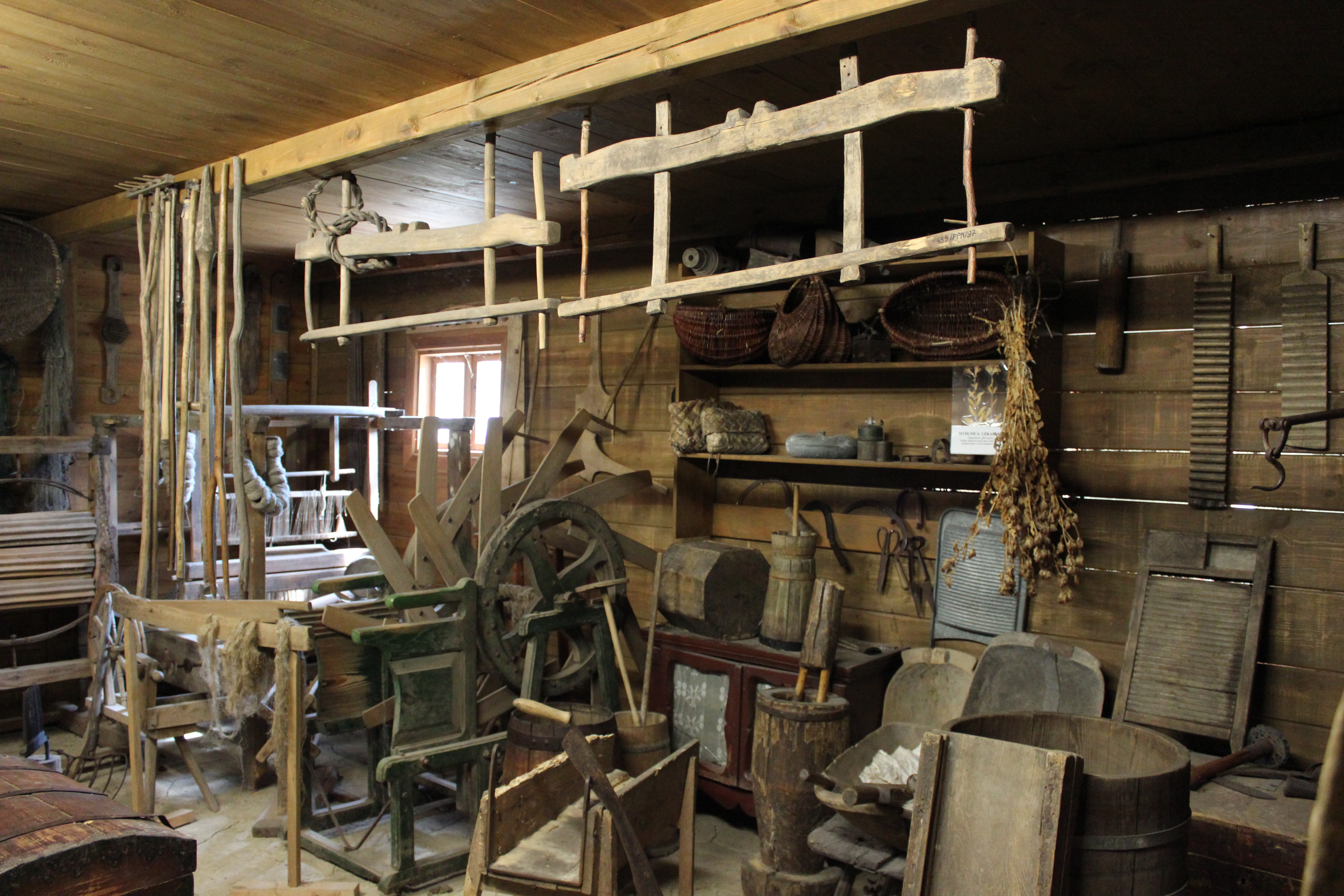
Cultural center with a museum

In the village of Załucze Stare there is a cultural center with a museum. There is also a small scientific exhibition, connected with an asylum for disabled animals.

== See also ==
- List of national parks of Poland
