= Włodawa County =

Włodawa County Powiat włodawski
- County
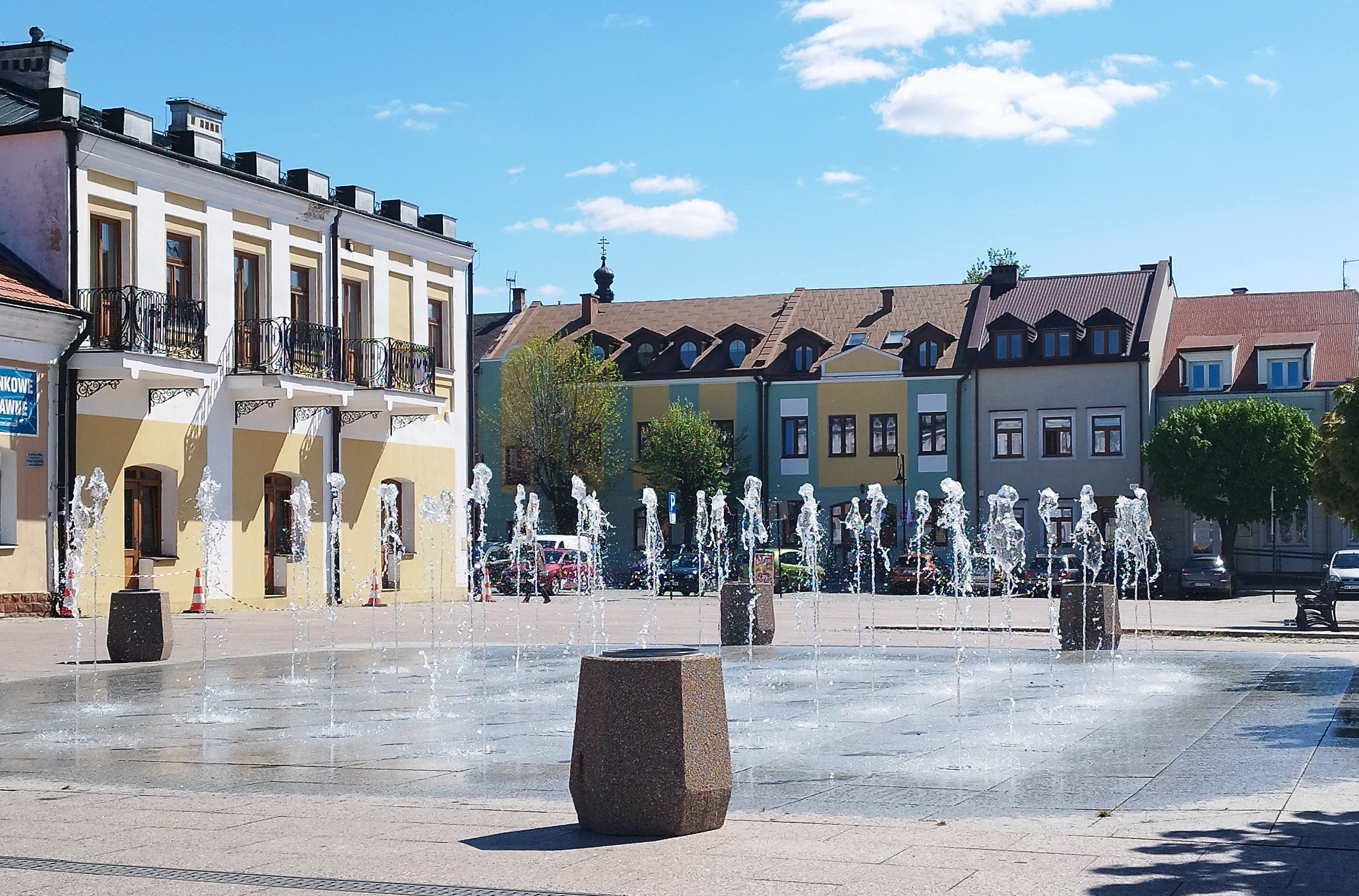
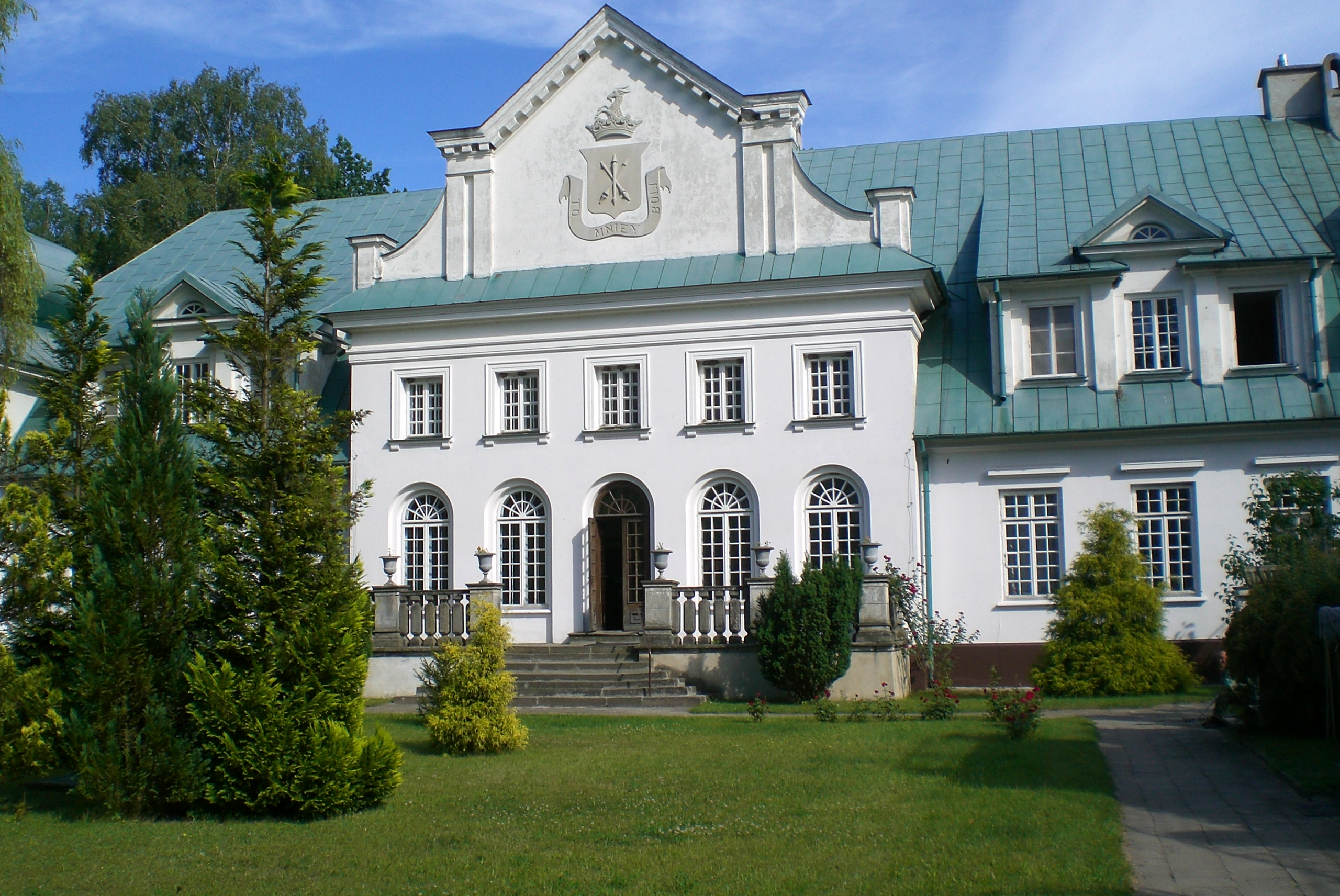
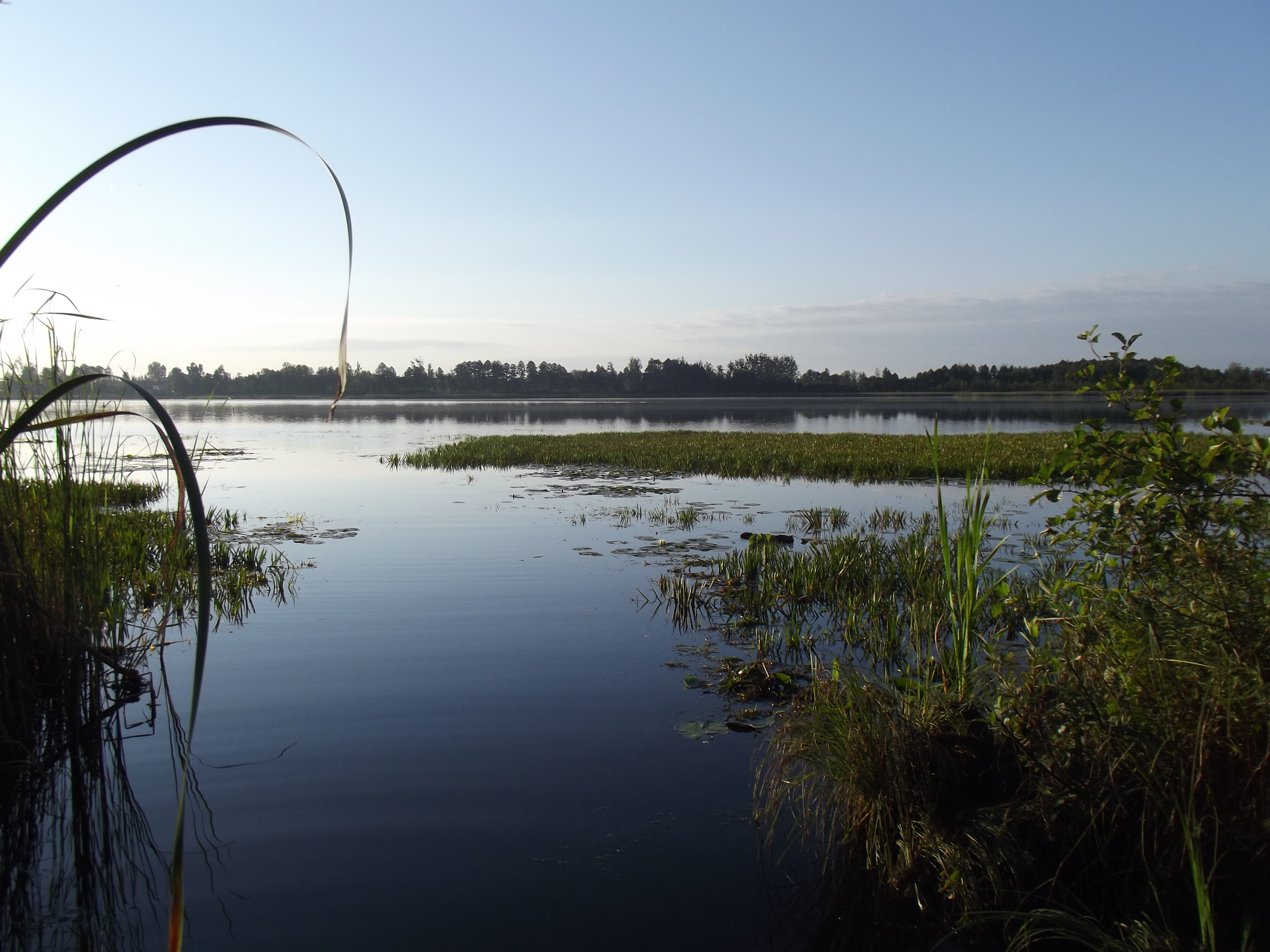
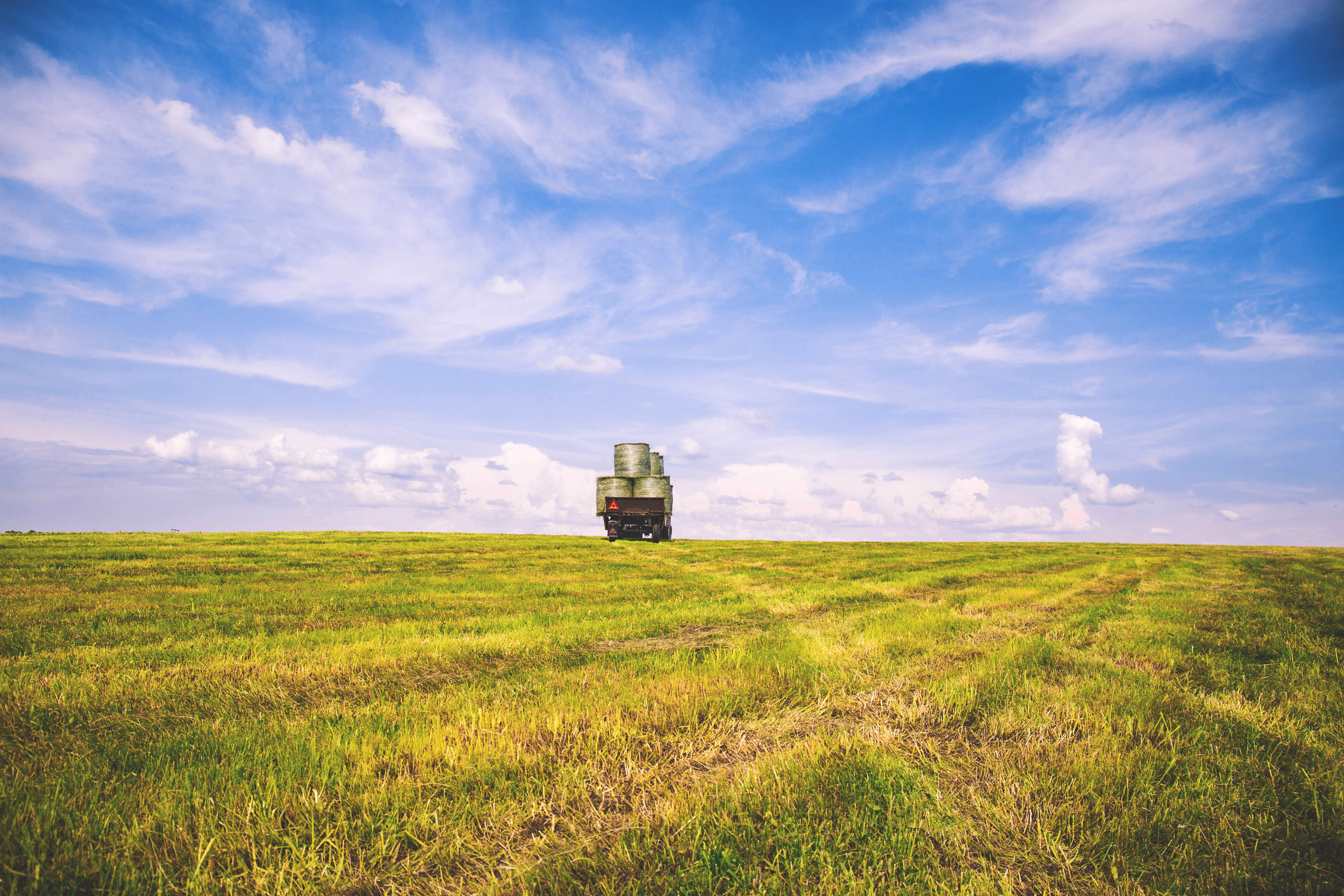
- Market Square in Włodawa Zamoyski Palace in Adampol Rotcze Lake Farmland in Suchawa

- Flag Coat of arms

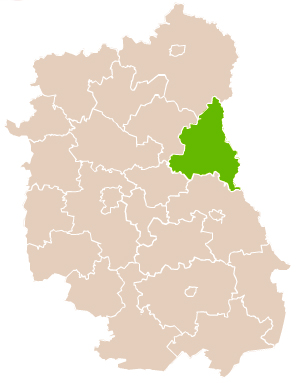
- Location within the voivodeship
- Coordinates (Włodawa): 51°33′N 23°33′E
- Country: Poland
- Voivodeship: Lublin
- Seat: Włodawa
- Gminas: Total 8 (incl. 1 urban): Włodawa; Gmina Hanna; Gmina Hańsk; Gmina Stary Brus; Gmina Urszulin; Gmina Włodawa; Gmina Wola Uhruska; Gmina Wyryki

Area
  - Total: 1,256.27 km^{2} (485.05 sq mi)

Population (2019)
  - Total: 38,524
  - Density: 30.665/km^{2} (79.423/sq mi)
  - Urban: 13,167
  - Rural: 25,357
- Time zone: UTC+1 (CET)
  - Summer (DST): UTC+2 (CEST)
- Car plates: LWL
- Website: www.powiat.wlodawa.pl

Włodawa County (Polish: powiat włodawski) is a unit of territorial administration and local government (powiat) in Lublin Voivodeship, eastern Poland, on the border with Ukraine and Belarus. It was established on January 1, 1999, as a result of the Polish local government reforms passed in 1998. Its administrative seat and only town is Włodawa, which lies 76 kilometres (47 mi) north-east of the regional capital Lublin.

The county covers an area of 1,256.27 square kilometres (485.0 sq mi). As of 2019, its total population is 38,524, including a population of 13,167 in Włodawa and a rural population of 25,357.

== Neighbouring counties ==
Włodawa County is bordered by Chełm County to the south, Łęczna County and Parczew County to the west, and Biała County to the north. It also borders Ukraine and Belarus to the east.

== Administrative divisions ==
The county is subdivided into eight gminas (one urban and seven rural). These are listed in the following table, in descending order of population.

Gmina	Type	Area (km^{2})	Population (2019)	Seat
Włodawa	urban	18.0	13,167	
Gmina Włodawa	rural	243.8	6,074	Włodawa (Note: seat not part of the gmina)
Gmina Urszulin	rural	171.6	4,156	Urszulin
Gmina Wola Uhruska	rural	150.9	3,860	Wola Uhruska
Gmina Hańsk	rural	179.4	3,732	Hańsk
Gmina Hanna	rural	139.0	2,868	Hanna
Gmina Wyryki	rural	219.5	2,562	Wyryki-Połód
Gmina Stary Brus	rural	133.4	2,105	Stary Brus
