= Max van Dam =

Dutch artist (1910–1943)

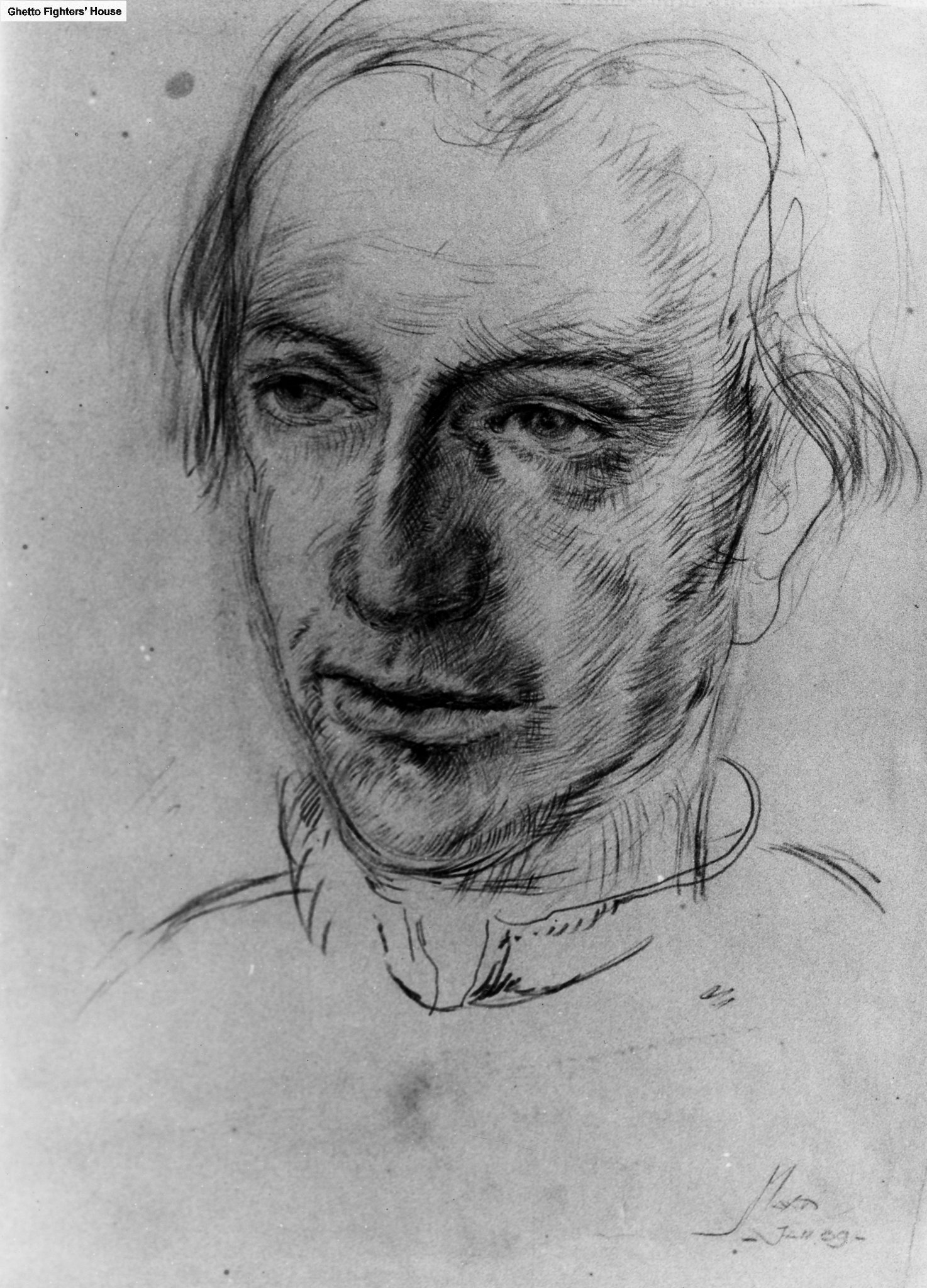
Self portrait

Max van Dam (March 19, 1910 – c. September 20, 1943) was a Jewish artist born in Winterswijk in the Netherlands. He was murdered in the Sobibor extermination camp.

== Early life (–1931) ==
Max van Dam was the son of Aron van Dam and Johanna van Dam née Leviticus. Both his parents were Jewish. He grew up in a socialist environment. His father was a certified meat inspector who became the director of the cooperative store De Dageraad, literal translation The Dawn, in Winterswijk, where he had a seat on the town council for the Dutch Social Democratic Workers' Party (SDAP). Van Dam showed an early interest in art, drawing portraits and painting landscapes, and although his father did not encourage an artistic career he did provide Van Dam with early painting commissions. Between 1922 and 1929 Van Dam attended the Rijks Hogere Burgerschool in Winterswijk. His artistic inspirations at the time include Vincent van Gogh and Käthe Kollwitz. It is at this time that his artistic talents and ambitions are noticed by family friend and Max van Dam's lifelong benefactor Dr. Jacob “Jaap” Hemelrijk, who persuaded his father to allow Van Dam to pursue an education in the arts.

== Art education (1931–1937) ==
To continue his education Van Dam moved to Amsterdam where he first studied to become a grammar school art teacher. Upon completion of the degree, in 1931, he did not take a teaching position but instead enrolled in the Royal Academy of Fine Arts in Antwerp, where he took courses from 1933 to 1937. Here he specialised in portraiture and studied under Isodoor Opsomer. In this period his life evolved against the background of the rise of the Nazi Party in Germany and the associated anti-semitism, a growing concern of Van Dam and his acquaintances. Van Dam primarily lived in Antwerp but moved frequently between the Netherlands and Belgium and also travelled to Italy and France, to develop his painting skills and improve on his social awareness. In 1932 van Dam designed a stained-glass window for De Dageraad, the work was finished in 1934. That same year he designed the poster for the Demonstration for Socialism and Democracy, organised, for September 16, by the SDAP and the Nederlands Verbond van Vakverenigingen, the Dutch Association of Trade Unions. In 1936 and 1937 he was a frequent guest of Jaap Hemelrijk and his family, in Bergen, where he met graphic artist Fré Cohen and painters Leo Gestel, Charley Toorop and Matthieu Wiegman associated with the Bergen School. His interest in zionism increased and he accepted a commission to paint a portrait of Theodor Herzl. In spite of growing recognition van Dam had a difficult time earning a living as an artist. Between 1933 and 1937 he applied for and was one of the recipients of, the Koninklijke Subsidie voor Vrije Schilderkunst, the Royal Subsidy for painting, awarded annually since 1871, to encourage young painters.

Towards the end of his period at the Royal Academy the relationship with Opsomer deteriorated due to stylistic and personal disagreements and Van Dam returned to Amsterdam, resolved to prepare a submission for the ‘’Prix de Rome’’, an encouragement prize for young artists. He was awarded the silver medal for his entry, a painting of ‘’Hagar and Ishmael’’, in 1938. (Note: Neither the gold nor the bronze medal were awarded that year. The whereabouts of the painting is unknown.) In the period he continued to struggle to support himself and managed a meagre existence from his painting sales, commission work and the occasional prize money won in other contest exhibitions, such as the prize from the artist society Arti et Amicitiae of which he was a member. He also received encouragement and financial support from benefactors and expanded his circle of acquaintances among Dutch artists and connoisseurs as his own recognition as an artist grew. The art collectors Hans de Jong, a textile manufacturer from Hengelo, and his wife Alice de Jong-Weil, were among the customers for his portraits with whom he established friendly relations.

van Dam's work was included in the 1939 exhibition and sale Onze Kunst van Heden (Our Art of Today) at the Rijksmuseum in Amsterdam.

== Under Nazi occupation (1940–1943) ==
After the May 10, 1940 invasion and occupation of the Netherlands by Nazi German forces, Van Dam initially continued to work as before but, as anti-Jewish measures increased throughout 1941, he went into hiding in Blaricum, where he continued to work. He attempted to escape and managed to reach Vichy France but returned to the Netherlands several months later in an effort to attempt an escape with Alice Weil and her daughter, Jacqueline de Jong, to Weil's native Switzerland. In the autumn of 1942 they managed to reach the French Alps but were arrested as a result of betrayal. Van Dam was taken to the Drancy internment camp. During his incarceration there he was able to paint and created prints from engravings which he sent to Alice Weil, who had managed to escape to Switzerland shortly after their arrest. She later donated two of these works to the Ghetto Fighters' House and Yad Vashem. (Note: Some of his drawings from Blaricum survive, David Gussak included Van Dam's sketch A Jewish woman in Hiding, charcoal on paper, in Drawing Strength: The Art of the Holocaust, a drawing preserved in the Ghetto Fighters' House.)

== Sobibor, death (1943) ==
On March 25, 1943, he was deported on transport 53 from Drancy to the Sobibor extermination camp. Upon arrival in Sobibor he was among the skilled workers selected while the remainder of the deportees were gassed or shot. Van Dam was set up in a studio for craftsmen where he created paintings for the camp staff. Sobibor survivor Kurt Ticho, who had befriended Van Dam in the camp, later recalled that deputy camp commander SS-Oberscharführer (Staff Sergeant) Gustav Wagner had ordered Van Dam to paint him based on the image on a postcard. Ticho testified during the Sobibor trial in Hagen that van Dam had painted portraits for the SS. Another survivor, Ursula Stern, mentioned in her post-war statements that Heinrich Himmler had posed for a portrait by Van Dam on an inspection tour of the extermination camp and its gassing operations. In the craftsmen's workshop Van Dam worked alongside Li van Staden, Moshe Goldfarb and the surviving gold smith Stanislaw Szmajzner. During much of his time in the camp Van Dam had a privileged position. When approximately 70 Dutch men assigned to slave-labour in the camp were murdered, following a betrayed escape attempt, he was exempt from these reprisal killings. SS-Oberscharführer Karl Frenzel stated in 1983 that he had kept one of the paintings by Van Dam but that his family had destroyed it, and everything else that connected Frenzel with the camps, after his 1962 arrest. He further stated that Van Dam had been killed in the revolt and that the paintings in Sobibor's staff quarters had been destroyed at the same time.

The details and exact date of Van Dam's death remain unclear. Survivors have indicated that he was killed shortly after completing his last painting commission, in September 1943. Jules Schelvis notes, that Frenzel's assertion that Van Dam was killed in the revolt may have been self-serving. Schelvis concluded this based on statements by Alexander Pechersky, who was emphatic in his declarations never to have met Van Dam because the painter had already been killed prior to his own arrival in Sobibor, on September 23, 1943.

His father, Aron van Dam, mother Johanna van Dam née Leviticus and youngest sister, Henrietta van Dam, were murdered in Auschwitz in 1942. His other sister, Roza Henriette "Roosje" van Dam, survived the Holocaust.

== Posthumous recognition, exhibitions and commemoration ==
Christiaan Roosen cited André Glavimans' observation, from Elsevier, March 1, 1947: "Little of Max van Dam remains but it is enough to give him a place among the painters of his generation." Between 1946 and 1966 works by Max van Dam were included in exhibitions commemorating Jewish artists who were murdered during the Holocaust. In 1966 the first posthumous solo exhibition was held in, Goois Museum. Roosen includes a quotation from Jan Koenraads who wrote in Het Vrije Volk on May 12, 1966: "All his works breathe sensitivity, composure and a longing for pure aesthetics." Roosen writes that Koenraads had described, in a review published in Elsevier two days later, ""The exhibition had given him a sour sensation because in civilised Europe" it had been possible for a budding painter "to be torn off as a branch from a tree."" Roosen also notes that a still life by Van Dam from the collection of the Stedelijk Museum Amsterdam was included in the exhibition commemorating Jewish Artists who perished in the Holocaust, held in Tel Aviv, in 1968, on the twentieth anniversary of Israel. Works by van Dam have been acquired by the municipal government of his home town of Winterswijk and remain on display in public buildings and in the museum in the town, which has also occasionally hosted retrospective exhibitions of his artwork. The Joods Historisch Museum, Jewish Historical Museum in Amsterdam has a large collection of Van Dam's works, in different media, including a self-portrait Van Dam painted, oil on canvas, in 1935/1936, showing the artist, en face, at 25 years of age.

A street was named after Max v. Dam in his home town in 1963. On the memorial in Israel, dedicated to the 80.000 Jews deported from France, Max van Dam's name is carved among the names of deportees on the panel for Transport 53 from Drancy with final destination Sobibor.
