= Sobibor (film) =

- Directed by: Konstantin Khabensky
- Screenplay by: Konstantin Khabensky; Aleksandr Adabashyan; Andrei Nazarov; Anna Chernakova
- Produced by: Elmira Aynulova; Nataliya Doroshkevich; Kestutis Drazdauskas; Mariya Zhuromskaya
- Starring: Aleksandr Ilyin; Konstantin Khabensky; Christopher Lambert; Michalina Olszanska; Wolfgang Cerny; Maximilian Dirr; Mariya Kozhevnikova; Philippe Reinhardt
- Cinematography: Ramunas Greicius
- Edited by: Yuriy Troyankin
- Music by: Kuzma Bodrov
- Production companies: Cinema Production; Fetisov Illusion
- Distributed by: Karoprokat
- Release date: 3 May 2018 (Russia)
- Country: Russia
- Languages: Russian, German, Dutch, Polish, Yiddish
- Budget: $2.4 million
- Box office: $5.1 million

Sobibor (Russian: Собибор) is a 2018 Russian war drama film co-written, directed by, and starring Konstantin Khabensky. The picture also stars Christopher Lambert and was released on 3 May 2018 in Russia. It was selected as the Russian entry for the Best Foreign Language Film at the 91st Academy Awards, but it was not nominated. It received generally positive reviews from critics.

== Plot ==
The film is based on the Sobibor revolt, which occurred in 1943 in German-occupied Poland. The main character of the movie is the Jewish-Soviet soldier Alexander Pechersky, who was a lieutenant in the Red Army. In October 1943, he was deported to the Sobibor death camp, where Jews were being exterminated in gas chambers. In just three weeks, Pechersky planned an uprising with prisoners from Poland and other locations around Western Europe. This uprising was partly successful, allowing roughly 300 prisoners to escape, of whom roughly 60 survived the war.

== Cast ==
- Aleksandr Ilyin — Andrey
- Konstantin Khabenskiy – Alexander 'Sasha' Pechersky
- Christopher Lambert – Karl Frenzel
- Michalina Olszańska – Hanna (Cameo appearance)
- Wolfgang Cerny – Gustav Wagner
- Maximilian Dirr - Johann Niemann
- Mariya Kozhevnikova — Selma
- Philippe Reinhardt – Siegfried Graetschus
- Felice Jankell – Luca
- Mindaugas Papinigis - Berg
- Saulius Balandis - Josef Wölf
- Dirk Martens - Rudolf Beckmann

== Production ==
Initially the project was titled "Legend of the Escape". In early reports, Andrei Malyukov was credited as director, but at a press conference in September 2017, it was revealed that Khabensky in fact directed the film.

Principal photography took place near Vilnius, Lithuania.

== Release ==
Samuel Goldwyn Films has secured North American distribution rights. The U.S. release date was 2 April 2019.

== Reception ==
=== Box office ===
Sobibor grossed $0 in North America and $5.1 million in other territories, against a production budget of $2.4 million.

=== Critical response ===
On review aggregator website Rotten Tomatoes, the film holds an approval rating of 75% based on 16 reviews, with an average rating of 6.8/10.

== Inaccuracy ==
Pechersky was captured by the Germans in October 1941, not in 1943. Sobibor was the site of one of two (not the only) successful uprisings by Jewish Sonderkommando prisoners during Operation Reinhard. The revolt at Treblinka extermination camp on 2 August 1943 resulted in up to 100 escapees.

There are several inaccuracies with the place and cause of death of the particular SS-Totenkopfverbände members killed in the revolt.

- SS-Untersturmführer Johann Niemann was not killed at the camp's armory as shown in the movie but rather in the tailor's workshop. Another inaccuracy with Niemann (played by Maximilian Dirr) is that the rank of his uniform. In the movie Niemann is ranked as SS-Oberscharführer however his real rank should be of an SS-Untersturmführer.
- SS-Unterscharführer Walter "Ryba" Hochberg is referred to as "Berg" in the movie, following Alexander Pechersky's mistaken recollection. However, Hochberg's death occurred in the camp's garage rather than the tailor's workshop.
- SS-Oberscharführer Karl Frenzel was not wounded during the revolt.
- There are also inaccuracies in the decorations which Frenzel is shown as wearing: his uniform displays the 1914 Iron Cross 1st Class, and the ribbon for the second class award of the same decoration, as well as the ribbon for the Honour Cross of the World War 1914/1918. He is also shown in some scenes as wearing the Baltic Cross, an unofficial Freikorps decoration. The real Frenzel was born in 1911, and so was unable to have earned any of these decorations.

The gas chambers at the camp were not partially underground as depicted, nor were there in-built crematorium as in Auschwitz-Birkenau. The bodies were removed and either buried or burnt on open-air pyres. The Schlauch (or "Tube") that led to the gas chamber was not underground but an outdoor fenced path covered in branches. Leon Felhendler also did not die during the escape.

== See also ==
- Escape from Sobibor — 1987 television film about the same topic.
- List of submissions to the 91st Academy Awards for Best Foreign Language Film
- List of Russian submissions for the Academy Award for Best Foreign Language Film
