= Sobibor uprising =

Planned escape by prisoners in October 1943 in Sobibor prison camp

- Part of Jewish resistance in German-occupied Europe
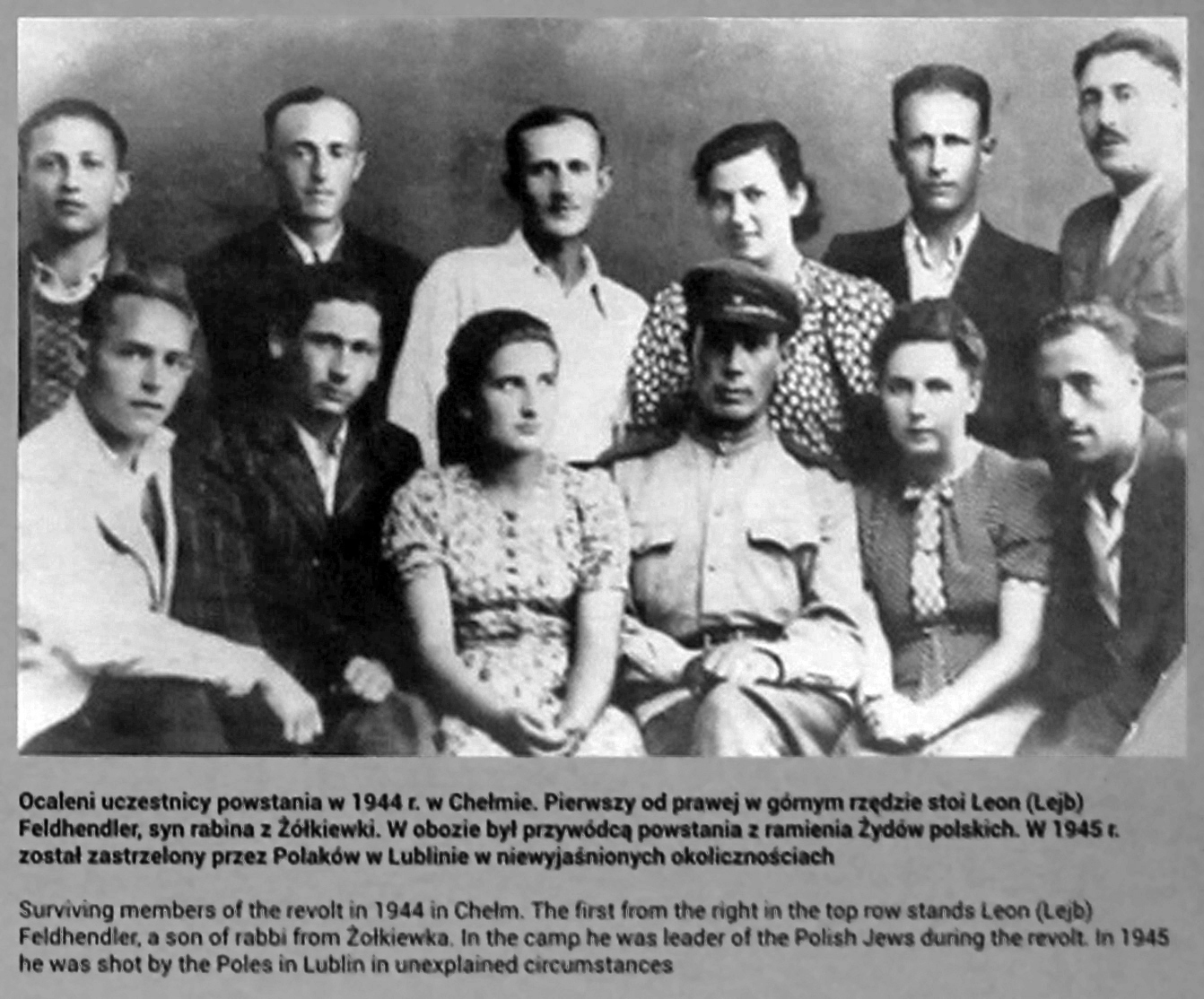
- Group of Sobibor insurgents, with Leon Felhendler at the top right
Date	14 October 1943
Location	Sobibor extermination camp, German-occupied Poland (General Government)
Result	Jewish victory: Escape of around 300 prisoners

Belligerents
Nazi Germany; Trawnikimänner	Camp resistance

Commanders and leaders
(Nazi Germany) Johann Niemann † (Nazi Germany) Karl Frenzel	(Soviet Union) Alexander Pechersky (Poland) Leon Felhendler

Strength
17 Germans; ~120 Trawniki men	~600 prisoners

Casualties and losses
12 Germans killed 2 Trawniki men killed	~300 prisoners killed

The Sobibor uprising (Polish: Powstanie w Sobiborze; German: Aufstand von Sobibór) was a revolt of about 600 prisoners that occurred on 14 October 1943, during World War II and the Holocaust at the Sobibor extermination camp in occupied Poland. It was the second uprising in an extermination camp, partly successful, by Jewish prisoners against the SS forces, following the revolt in Treblinka.

SS soldiers executed up to 250,000 Jews using gas at the Sobibor extermination camp. Most of the victims were from Poland, about 33,000 were from the Netherlands, and several thousand were from Germany. After this uprising, the SS no longer used the death camp. The Nazis destroyed the camp down to its foundations and leveled the camp area. To cover up the crimes committed at the site, they established an inconspicuous farm in its place and planted a pine forest over the remnants of the camp.

== Previous escape attempts ==
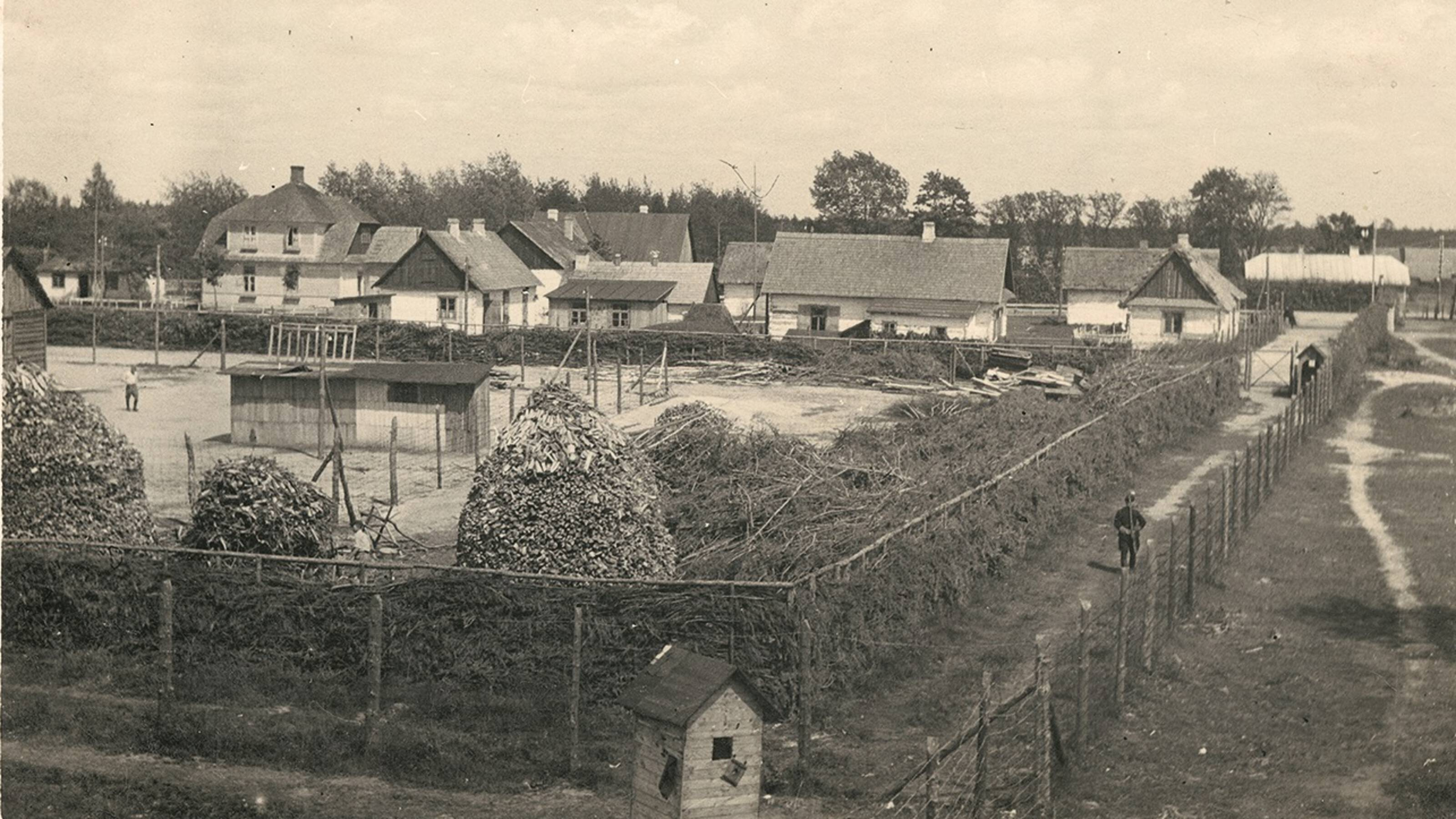
Sobibor camp, 1943

Attempts by prisoners to escape from the Sobibor extermination camp occurred throughout its existence. These were sporadic attempts. Most failed, and the prisoners were caught and immediately killed, or brought back to the camp and executed along with other prisoners. These escape attempts occurred before the uprising. Among the 47 camp survivors whose names are known, there were five members of the 'Forest Commando' who managed to escape during a previous attempt.

In June 1943, a minefield was laid around the camp to prevent escapes. Near the main gate opposite the camp headquarters and the parade ground of Camp No. 1, there were no mines to avoid endangering the SS personnel.

=== The resistance group ===
In the spring of 1943, when fewer Jewish transports arrived at the Sobibor camp, the prisoners realized that the camp's liquidation was approaching, which meant their execution. As a result, the prisoners formed a resistance group of ten to twelve inmates led by Leon Felhendler.

In the resistance group, several ideas were proposed, including poisoning the SS officers, setting the camp on fire, or digging several escape tunnels. In the summer of 1943, prisoners in Camp No. 3 began to dig an escape tunnel. When the tunnel was discovered and the prisoners were confined, the SS officers executed the diggers by shooting them in the head and killing all the other prisoners in that camp.

On 23 September 1943, a group of 80 Soviet prisoners of war arrived at the camp, including Alexander Pechersky, who was a lieutenant in the Red Army, in a transport that included about 2,000 Jews. The battle-hardened soldiers, skilled in tactical operations, managed to plan precise military actions and execute them exactly as planned. Felhendler and Pechersky established contact and formed an "underground committee" consisting of four Soviet prisoners of war and four of Felhendler’s men. The committee met continuously, shared information, and devised escape plans.

They were forced to abandon the initial mass escape plan through an escape tunnel due to high water levels and the location of the minefield. Subsequently, Pechersky planned the escape of all prisoners. For this, he planned to secretly kill the SS officers and then execute a mass breakout of all prisoners from the camp. The escape date was postponed several times for various reasons. Finally, the designated day of escape was set due to the camp commander’s absence. The idea was to lure the SS officers to traps prepared in the carpentry workshop and the clothing warehouse, under the pretext of issuing special and beautiful clothes and shoes for their wives, and to murder them there quietly and secretly an hour before the mass escape. To cover up the disappearance of the murdered SS officers, some of the Soviet prisoners were supposed to wear SS uniforms.

The carpenters in camp number 4 had axes, hammers, and other carpentry tools for their work. The prisoners in the metal shop prepared knives from sheet metal. The handguns of the murdered SS officers were supposed to be handed over to the Soviet prisoners experienced in operating weapons.

=== Plan ===
To ensure secrecy, only 30 to 40 prisoners, who were supposed to form combat groups, were involved in the plans. The dates 13 or 14 October were chosen for the escape day. This was because the prisoners knew that the camp commander, Franz Reichleitner, his deputy Gustav Wagner, who was considered particularly dangerous and cruel, and other SS officers would not be in the camp on that day. Karl Frenzel, one of the inner camp commanders at Sobibor and considered the most cruel SS man in the camp, was to be lured to the carpentry shed on the day of the rebellion where Semyon Rosenfeld was to stab him to death.

The operation was to begin at 16:00, and the escape was planned for 17:00 near sunset. The telephone connection to the outside was supposed to be cut off at the start of the rebellion. After the killing of the SS officers, all prisoners were to assemble at 17:00 as usual in the parade ground. There, they were to inform the prisoners who were not among the initiators of the plan about the escape from the camp. In the next stage, the prisoners were supposed to march in orderly rows to the main gate, which was not mined. Soviet soldiers in SS uniforms were supposed to accompany the marching captives as a disguise and command them in German. In the nearby forest, there were initial hiding places as darkness fell. If the route through the main gate was not feasible, the prisoners were instructed to detonate the mines by throwing stones to create an alternative escape path. In this case, the Soviet POWs were to run to open the wire fences in groups and defend against the remaining SS officers and guards using the weapons they had captured. The prisoners distributed money and valuables among themselves to use during the escape.

The camp's guard included 25 to 30 German SS officers, with at least 18 always present in the camp. In addition to them, there were about 90 to 120 Ukrainian guards, from the Trawniki men. Their behaviour was the main element of uncertainty in the plan. The "underground committee" hoped that if the Soviet soldiers, dressed in SS uniforms, gave orders in German to the marching camp prisoners, the Trawniki guards would not suspect anything.

The mass escape was originally planned for 13 October 1943. However, since another SS team arrived at the Sobibor extermination camp on that day, the underground committee was forced to postpone the operation by one day.

== Uprising ==
On 14 October 1943, at 4:00 PM (15 Tishrei 5704, during the festival of Sukkot), close to sunset, the rebellion began as planned. It was led by Pechersky in Camp Number 1, and Felhendler was in Camp Number 2.

The killing of the SS personnel was first. Johann Niemann, the deputy camp commander, was the highest-ranking SS officer on duty that day and the first person the rebels planned to assassinate. Niemann was killed in the tailor’s shed, struck twice in the head with a hatchet by Jewish Soviet POW Alexander Shubayev while trying on a leather coat. Josef Wolf, an SS squad commander, was killed by a hatchet blow while he was trying on a leather coat in the sorting shed. Yehuda Lerner, a 17-year-old, and Arkadi Vaispapir, a Soviet POW, killed the Trawniki commander Siegfried Gratzhus and the Ukrainian Oberman Ray Klatt using hatchets. Gratzhus and Niemann were the two SS officers with command authority in the camp that evening. Stanislaw "Shlomo" Szmajzner was part of a group of four prisoners who killed the camp's chief Kapo. To arm his team in his workshop, Szmajzner stole and hid several carpentry hatchets that were sent for sharpening. In addition, he also stole three rifles from the armoury after convincing the Ukrainian Trawniki volunteer that he was sent to take the rifles for repairs. He gave two rifles to the Soviet POWs and insisted on keeping the third for himself. In the chaos of the escape, Szmajzner shot a guard who was in the watchtower. At this stage, the telephone lines for external communication were also cut.

SS man Werner Dubois was shot and severely wounded by a hatchet. Camp prisoner Chaim Engel and the Kapo Puzhitsky stabbed the commanders of Camp Number 2, SS man Rudolf Beckmann and squad commander Thomas Stepple. Squad commanders of the SS, Fritz Konrad and Josef Vallaster, were killed alone in the workshop, and the commander of the SS squad, Friedrich Gaustelitz, was killed by a hatchet blow in Shlomo Leitman’s carpentry shop. SS man Walter Ryba died in the workshop. Additionally, SS men Novak, Max Brü and Ernst Stengelin were killed by the prisoners. By the evening, twelve SS men were killed and Dubois was severely injured; 12 out of 29 SS men who were part of the camp guard on the day of the rebellion were not present that day. Two Trawniki men were also killed: an unidentified Ukrainian guard and Klatt (the only Trawniki man who did not beat prisoners in the Sobibor extermination camp).

== Escape ==
The SS Oberscharführer Karl Frenzel did not arrive at the ambush spot planned for him in the carpentry shop, and SS trooper Walter Ryba unexpectedly encountered a rebel prisoner and was stabbed to death. This threatened the secrecy of the current phase of the rebellion and endangered the escape if the murdered man was discovered. Therefore, Pechersky decided to signal the evening command ten minutes earlier, causing unrest among the prisoners. They were upset because the signal for the command arrived prematurely and Frenzel, who was responsible for the roll calls, did not arrive at the command area in the parade ground. One of the Ukrainians trying to organize the prisoners standing in line was killed as a result. When SS mechanic Oberscharführer Erich Bauer arrived in a truck, he noticed a dead guard lying on the ground among the prisoners and immediately shot at the prisoners with a pistol. Afterwards, chaos erupted and about 600 prisoners escaped without coordination. The panicked Ukrainian Travniki volunteers began firing from the watchtowers and Frenzel fired a machine gun at the detainees. 60 prisoners from Camp Number 4 were arrested by the guards on their way to the command area due to the gunfire, and were detained and shot.

In the desperate attempts of the escaping prisoners to overcome the wire fences and minefields, they were caught in the guards’ crossfire, as they were stopped by wire fences and stepped on mines. About 365 people managed to escape from the extermination camp, but only 200 reached the nearby forest. About 150 prisoners remained in the camp.

The organized escape plan failed to materialize. Leon Felhendler and Alexander Pechersky managed to urge the prisoners to escape while they still could in order to survive and tell the world about the extermination of the Jews in the camp.

== Aftermath ==
Bauer and Frenzel managed to restore the external telephone lines and called for reinforcements only around 8:00 PM. All the prisoners who remained in the camp were murdered by the SS men. Those who reached the forest were later pursued by about 400 to 500 SS men and Ukrainian guards. About 100 escapees were killed in the pursuit. The surviving escapees joined partisans or went into hiding.

The SS men who were killed in the camp were buried in a military cemetery in the nearby town of Chełm. After the rebellion, under the orders of Heinrich Himmler, the SS brought about 100 Jewish prisoners from the Treblinka camp to dismantle the camp, destroy the camp buildings, and complete the extermination work and the burning of the bodies of the last Jews murdered in the camp. Subsequently, the Jews brought from Treblinka were executed after their work was completed. The Germans made sure to demolish the camp down to its foundations and levelled the area to cover up the crimes that had occurred in the extermination camp. In the place where the extermination camp stood, they established an innocuous-looking farm and planted a pine forest over the remnants of the camp.

In response to the uprising, Himmler and the SS implemented Aktion Erntefest (Operation Harvest Festival). On November 3rd 1943, 2 subcamps to the Majdanek concentration camp were liquidated and thousands of workers were shot in pits. At the same time, the SS separated the Jewish prisoners from the others and forced them to strip and climb down into trenches outside of the camp fence. The SS used loudspeakers loudly playing music to attempt to mask the sounds of the massacre. The death toll of the massacre was 18,400 people, making it the most deadly single day massacre of the entire Holocaust.

After World War II, 47 prisoners from the Sobibor extermination camp survived, including eight women. The survivor Jules Schelvis later wrote: "Without the uprising in Sobibor, there would have been no survivors who witnessed the mass murder there."

The Sobibor trial in the mid-1960s was a trial against 12 SS men from the Sobibor extermination camp, held in front of the regional court of Hagen. It was preceded by two Sobibor trials in Berlin and Frankfurt in 1950. Trials concerning the crimes committed at Sobibor continued in the 1970s and 1980s.

On 3 June 2019, Simjon Rosenfeld, one of the last survivors involved in the Sobibor uprising, died at the age of 96 at Kaplan Hospital and was buried in the cemetery in Bnei Aish.

== Commemoration ==
On 14 October 2013, the 70th anniversary of the uprising, Sobibor survivors, including Thomas Blatt and Philip Bialowitz, family members, politicians, teenagers, and religious figures commemorated the victims of Sobibor. In the weekly Jüdische Allgemeine, historian and journalist Gabriela Leser criticized the fact that the Federal Republic of Germany had still not contributed funds to cover the costs and redesign of the Holocaust victims' memorial sites. The Polish Deputy Minister of Culture and National Heritage, Piotr Żuchowski, told the newspaper, "We do not expect the Germans, who built these death factories on Polish soil, to bear all the costs for the monuments, but we do expect them to bear some of them. He will send an official request to Berlin, as this is what our German partners want." German State Minister Cornelia Pieper, responsible for relations with Poland, explained that a few days earlier, Polish Secretary of State Waldemar Bartoszewski had clarified to the German ambassador in Poland "that Germany is not yet expected to support Sobibor at this time, he also noted that we are still prepared to support this project."

The Jewish Museum in Moscow commemorates the Sobibor death camp and the rebellion with an event in which Soviet soldier POWs participated and were murdered.
