= Sobibor perpetrator album =

Photo album of Sobibor extermination camp during the Holocaust

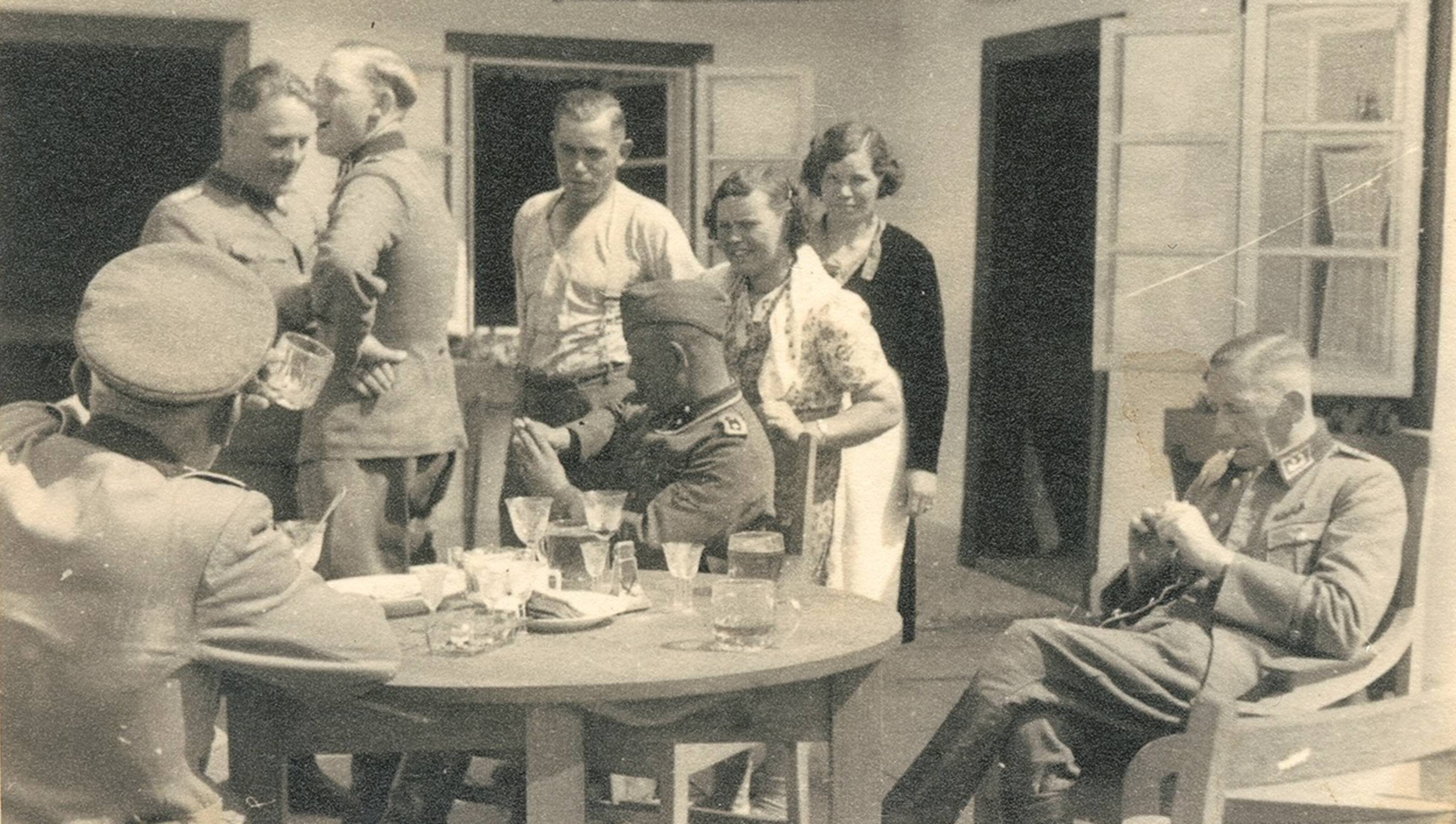
SS officers dining in the camp

The Sobibor perpetrator album contains sixty-two pictures of Sobibor extermination camp during its operation, taken by SS Holocaust perpetrators employed there. It belonged to deputy commander Johann Niemann, who was killed in the Sobibor uprising in 1943. The album was donated to the United States Holocaust Memorial Museum in 2020 by Niemann's grandson and is the first collection of photographs of the camp in operation to be published.

The USHMM states that it "has not been able to identify the copyright status of this material".

== See also ==
- Sobibor uprising
- Sobibor trial
