= Philip Bialowitz =

Polish-American Holocaust survivor and resistance fighter

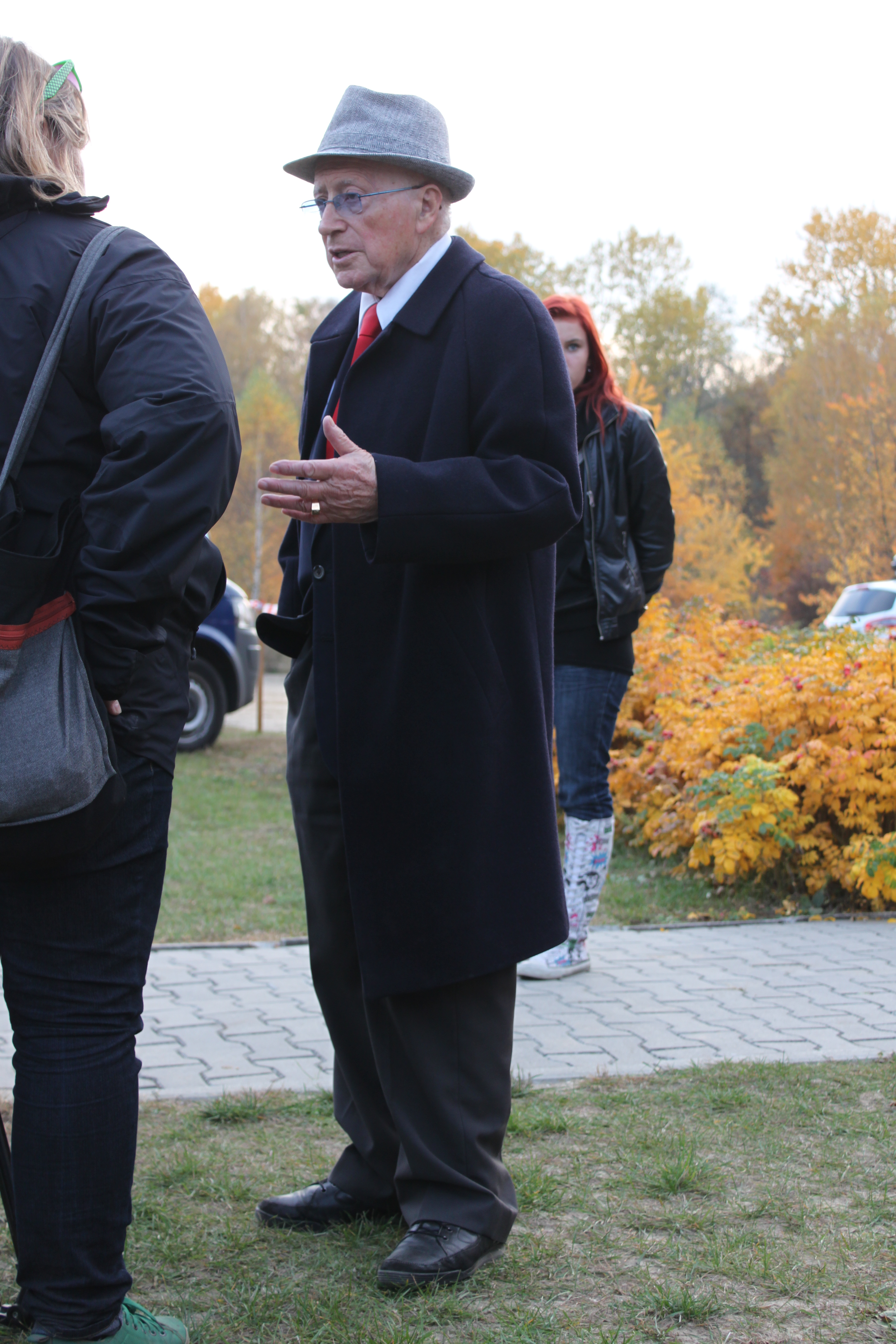
Bialowitz at Sobibor in 2013

Philip Bialowitz (December 25, 1925 in Izbica – August 6, 2016) was a Polish Holocaust survivor and resistance fighter.

== Life ==
Bialowitz was transported to Sobibor in April 1943 and quickly heard that his sisters and niece had been murdered in the gas chambers there. He credited his brother Simcha with saving his life, since when he arrived at the camp Simcha said he was a pharmacist and that Philip was his assistant. He was given the role of "working Jew", doing menial tasks such as shaving prisoners while avoiding being executed. The prisoners often believed they were merely being deloused instead of sent to extermination chambers. One day his task was to empty piles of dead bodies from train cars. He tried to pull a woman from the train but her skin stuck to his hands, amusing his Nazi overseer.

He and his brother joined a rebellion on October 14, 1943, which overpowered the Nazis and freed 300 of their prisoners. He heard one of the revolt's leaders say as they stood on a table, "If you survive, bear witness! Tell the world about this place!" Russian prisoners of war showed the Jews how to fight. Bialowitz served as the messenger, telling SS officers that they had boots and leather coats for them. When they came, the resisters killed eleven of them with knives and axes. Bialowitz recalled jumping over the barbed wire to run towards German officers quarters in order to cut off the electricity. After escaping the extermination camp, he wandered Lublin District with his brother and other survivors. They eventually found shelter with a Catholic couple named Michał and Maria Mazurek, who hid them in their barn until the Red Army arrived. Only about 50 escapees survived to the end of the war.

He was trained by a former Nazi doctor to be a dental assistant. After the war he married and had children while pushing for the prosecution of Nazi war criminals. Bialowitz moved to Columbus, Ohio. He eventually settled in New York and worked as a jeweler. Along with fellow survivor Thomas Blatt, he was one of the witnesses for the prosecution at the trial of John Demjanjuk in 2010.

=== Later life ===
He wrote the acclaimed book, A Promise at Sobibor, which detailed his early life growing up in Poland, his experience during World War II, and his postwar life. Later in life, he traveled around the world lecturing about the Holocaust and his personal experiences. Bialowitz often said that he had "a mission to perform."

He died in Florida on August 6, 2016, at the age of 90.
