= Stanisław Szmajzner =

Polish-born Holocaust survivor

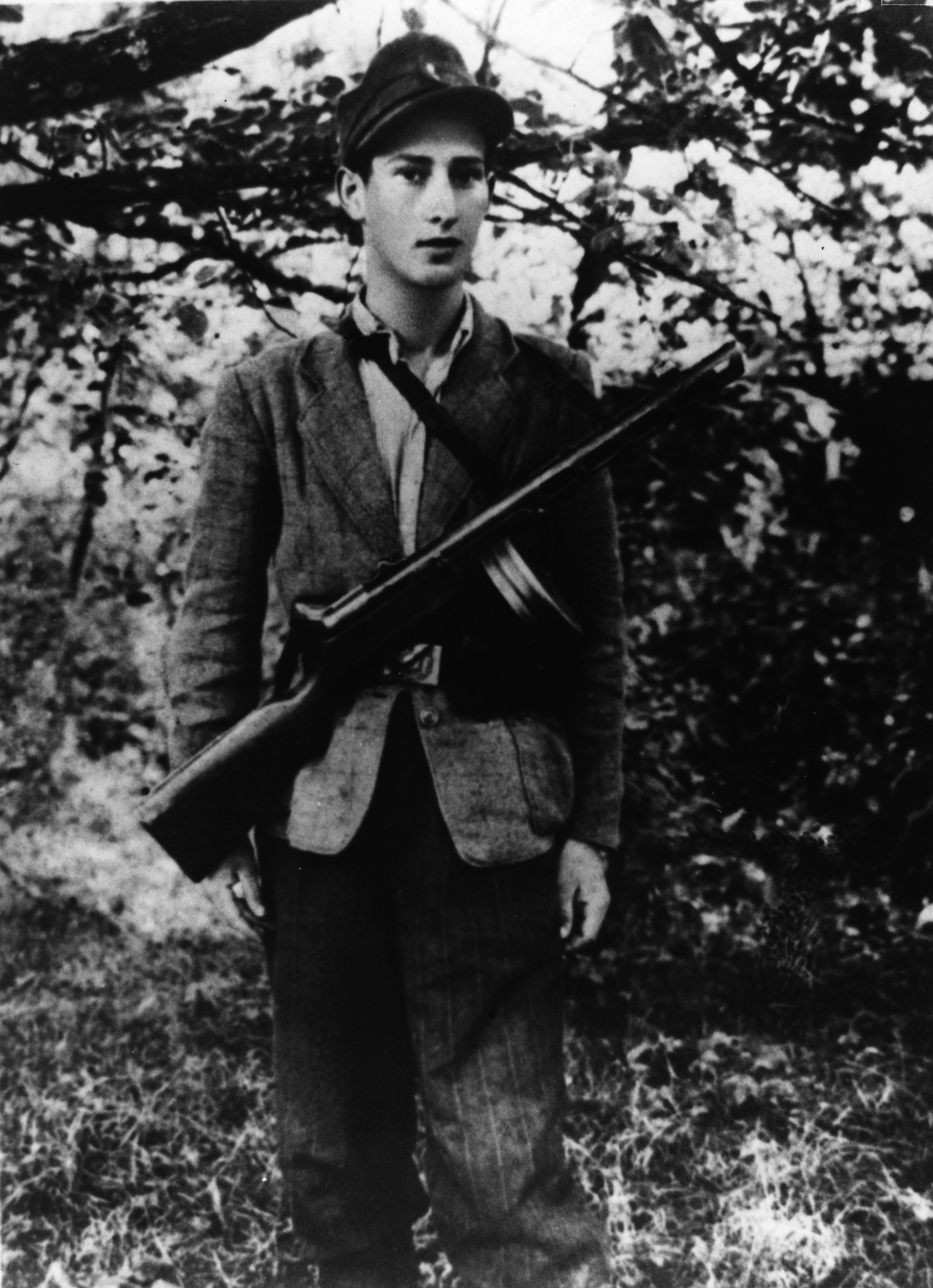
Stanisław Szmajzner as partisan, shortly after his escape from Sobibor

Stanisław Szmajzner (13 March 1927 – 3 March 1989) was a Polish-born Holocaust survivor who was one of 58 known survivors of the Sobibór extermination camp in German-occupied Poland, who participated in the 1943 camp-wide revolt and escape from Sobibór. He was born in Puławy, Poland and died in Goiânia, Brazil.

== Internment ==
Szmajzner arrived at Sobibór extermination camp on 12 May 1942 in a transport of about 2,000 Jews from the Eastern Poland Ghetto of Opole Lubelskie, together with his parents, a sister, brother, cousin, and nephew.

=== Occupations ===
On arrival, he was not murdered in the gas chambers because he proved to be a goldsmith, having carried along his bag of tools. He also managed to protect his brother, cousin, and nephew, insisting he needed their assistance. Given a makeshift goldsmith workshop, he was tasked by camp deputy commander Gustav Wagner to create golden accessories for the members of the SS at Sobibór using stolen coins, jewelry, or dental gold of murder victims. Orders included rings displaying SS runes and an ornamental knob for the whip used by Kurt Bolender in beating the prisoners. Under Franz Stangl's command of the camp, Szmajzner was made foreman in a mechanics workshop, tasked with general maintenance. Later, he and others were forced to produce the mines laid around the camp's outer fence. His job gave him wide access, except for Camp III, the area of gassing and burning of victims.

=== Revolt ===
16-year-old Szmajzner learned about the mass killings at Sobibór through messages from a friend forced to work at the gas chambers, secretly delivered by a Volksdeutsch guard. He then joined the camp's underground committee of Polish Jews around Leon Felhendler that planned an escape. He later took part in the camp-wide uprising on 14 October 1943 led by Soviet POW Alexander Pechersky, after over 17 months at Sobibór. In the advent of the revolt, he was part of a group of four prisoners that killed the camp's Chief Kapo to prevent denunciation. For armament, the team at his workshop stole and hid several carpentry axes that had been sent for sharpening. Szmajzner also stole three rifles from the armory after convincing the watchman on guard that he was on a repair mission. He handed two rifles to Soviet POWs and insisted on keeping the third. In the turmoil of the escape, Szmajzner shot a tower guard.

== Partisan ==
Szmajzner belonged to the roughly 200 prisoners, of about 600, who managed to escape from the camp into the nearby woods. He was part of Pechersky's group, consisting of 57 persons. To avoid discovery, the escapees split into smaller groups. Pechersky and seven other Russian POWs left to purchase food and make contact with the Home Army, with the remaining persons waiting for their return. After Pechersky did not return, they split into smaller groups and sought separate ways. Of Szmajzner's group of 15 or 16 survivors, 12 or 13 were later shot and killed by Polish bandits. He survived by dropping to the ground and playing dead.

== After World War II ==
In 1947, Szmajzner immigrated to Brazil, where in 1967 he recognized Franz Stangl. In May 1978, he also confirmed the identity of Gustav Wagner in a São Paulo police station. He visited West Germany a number of times to testify in trials, including against Stangl. Szmajzner wrote a book about his experiences as an adolescent in the death camp, which was published in 1968 in Brazil. Along with fellow survivors Thomas Blatt and Esther Terner Raab, he also contributed to the screenplay of the 1987 film Escape from Sobibor. He died in Goiânia, Brazil, on 3 March 1989.

== Works ==
- Inferno em Sobibor: A tragédia de um adolescente judeu [Hell in Sobibor: the tragedy of a teenage Jew]. Bloch Editores. 1968 – via Holocaust Research Project, extracts translated to English.
