= Simjon Rosenfeld =

Red Army soldier

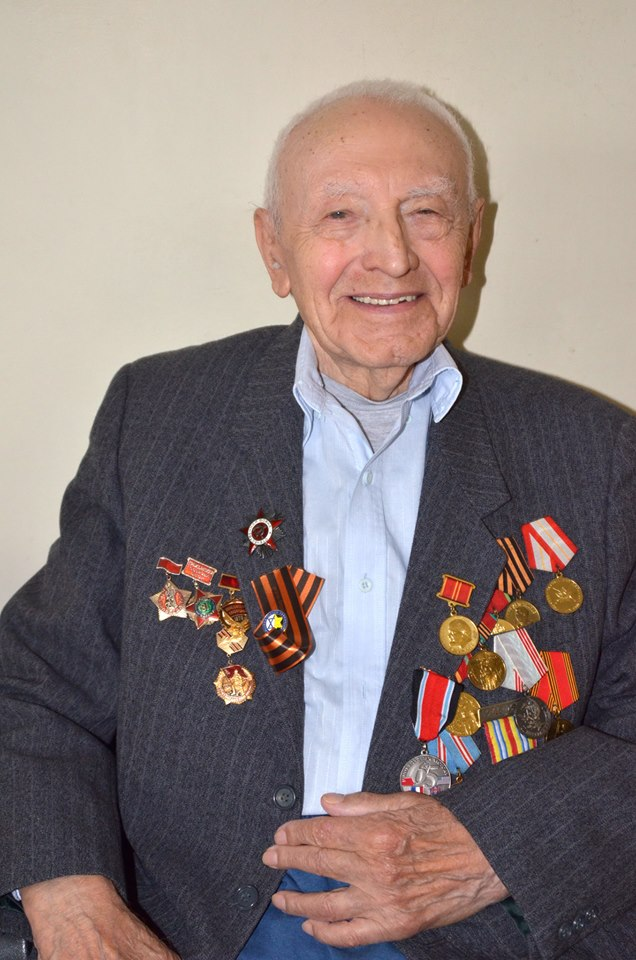
Simjon Rosenfeld (2016).

Simjon Rosenfeld (October 1, 1922 – June 3, 2019) was a survivor of the Sobibor death camp and a participant in the prisoner revolt which took place in that camp. Born in Ternivka, Gaysin uezd, Podolia Governorate, Ukrainian SSR (now Ternivka, Haisyn Raion, Vinnytsia Oblast, Ukraine), in 1940 he was recruited to the Red Army. In 1941, the Germans captured him and sent him to build a labor camp in Minsk. On 20 September 1943 he was transferred to Sobibor. The Germans separated the Jewish and non-Jewish soldiers but refrained from killing the non-Jewish soldiers as they had war prisoner status. On October 14, 1943, Rosenfeld participated in the uprising that resulted in his escape. Acting commander SS Untersturmfuehrer Johann Niemann entered the tailor shop in which Rosenfeld worked. While Isaac Lichtman held Niemann's leg tight – seemingly in an effort to pull off his boots – Rosenfeld and Arcady Wajspaper came out of the back room and split his skull with an axe. Rosenfeld escaped together with Dov Freiberg and later they joined Joseph Serchuk's partisan unit. He was separated from the other Russians, survived in hiding and then rejoined the Red Army and fought in the Battle of Berlin, where he carved the name "Sobibor" into the wall of the Reich Chancellery. After the war, he moved to Ukraine and then to Israel in the 1980s. Rosenfeld had two sons and five grandchildren at the time of his death. He received a eulogy from Israeli Prime Minister Benjamin Netanyahu.
