= Northern Cemetery, Rostov-on-Don =

Cemetery in Rostov-on-Don, Russia

Northern Cemetery
- Interactive map of Northern Cemetery

Details
- Established: 1972
- Location: Rostov-on-Don
- Country: Russia
- Coordinates: 47°18′32.74″N 39°42′7.79″E
- Size: 400 ha (990 acres)
- No. of graves: over 500,000
- Find a Grave: Northern Cemetery

The Northern Cemetery in Rostov-on-Don (Russian: Северное кладбище Ростова-на-Дону) is a cemetery in Rostov-on-Don, Russia. The cemetery is the largest cemetery by area in the European part of Russia and is also one of the largest cemeteries in the whole of Europe.

== History ==
The cemetery was established in 1972. It occupies an area of over 400 hectares and has more than 500,000 graves. It is quickly expanding: as of 2009, there were 355,034 graves on the area of 355 hectares. On its territory there also operates a crematorium, but traditional burials are more common. Northern Cemetery is also a place for Holy Protection Church and a chapel, a columbarium, administrative buildings and some firms that are engaged in manufacture of gravestones.

The cemetery is expanding. In summer there can be up to 50 burials a day, which poses a serious problem as there is not much free space left. Some experts say that in future more relatives of the deceased will have to resort to cremation.

== Notable burials ==
- Iosif Vorovich (1920—2001) — Soviet and Russian mathematician, academician of the Russian Academy of Sciences.
- Valentin Nikolayev (1924—2004) — Soviet wrestler, Olympic champion, Honored Master of Sports.
- Alexander Pechersky (1909—1990) — Red Army officer, the leader of the only successful uprising in a concentration camp during the Second World War.
- Gennadiy Tsypkalov (1973—2016) — A statesman of the Luhansk People's Republic, Prime Minister from 26 August 2014 to 26 December 2015.

== Gallery ==
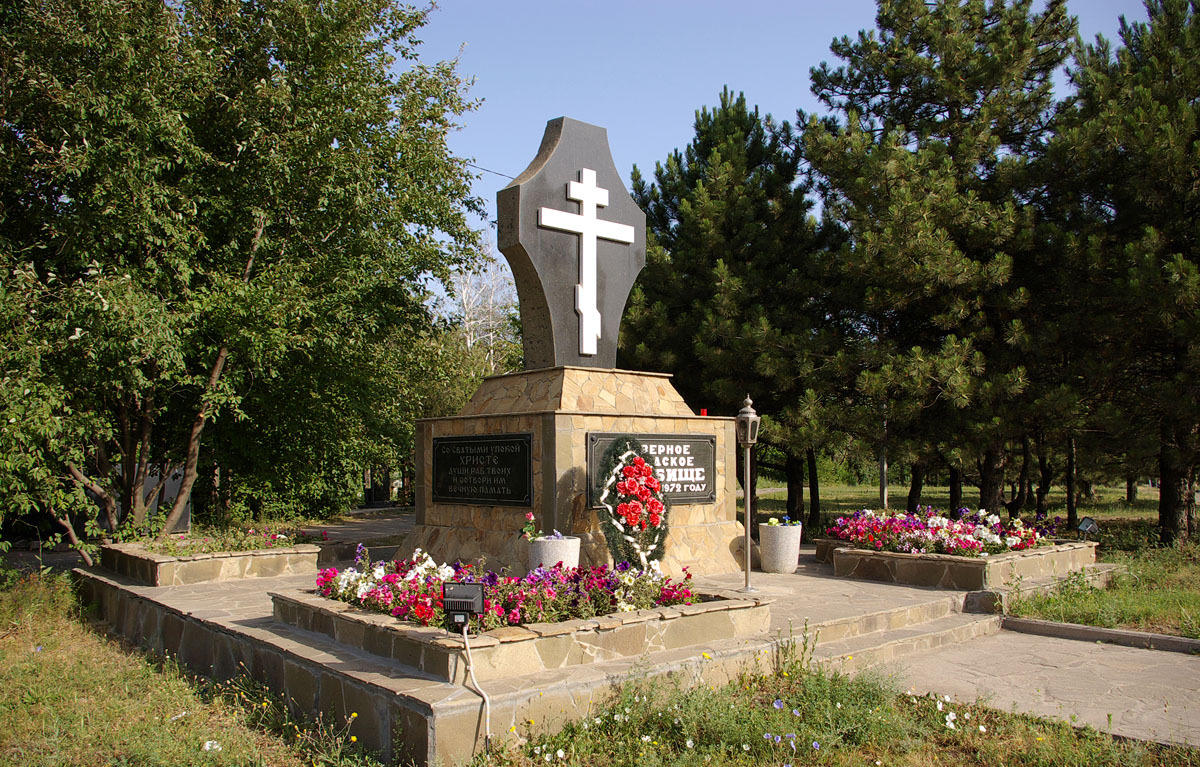
The memorial sign near the entrance to the Northern Cemetery

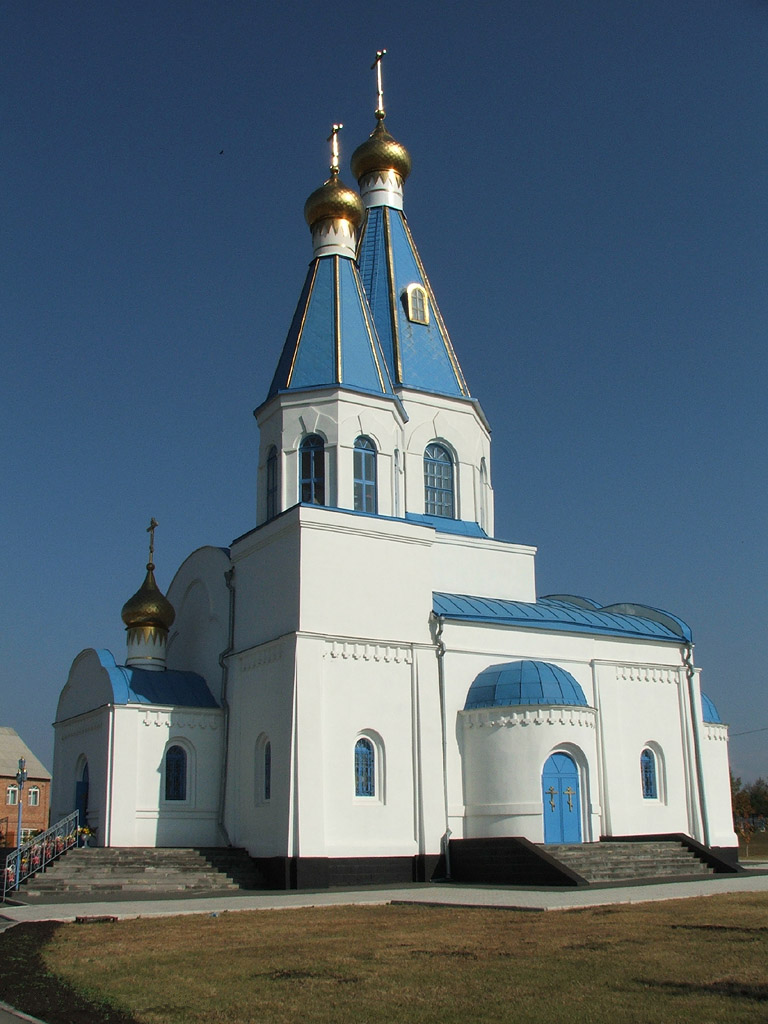
Church of Protection of the Holy Virgin

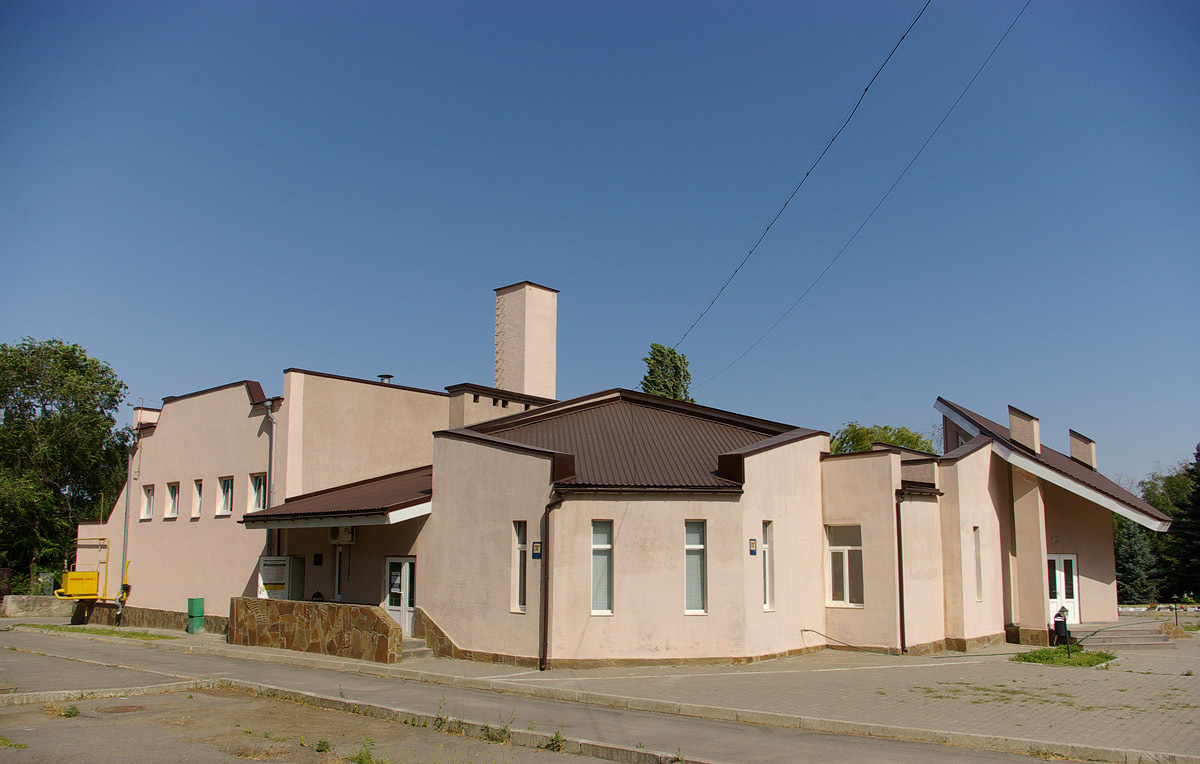
Crematorium

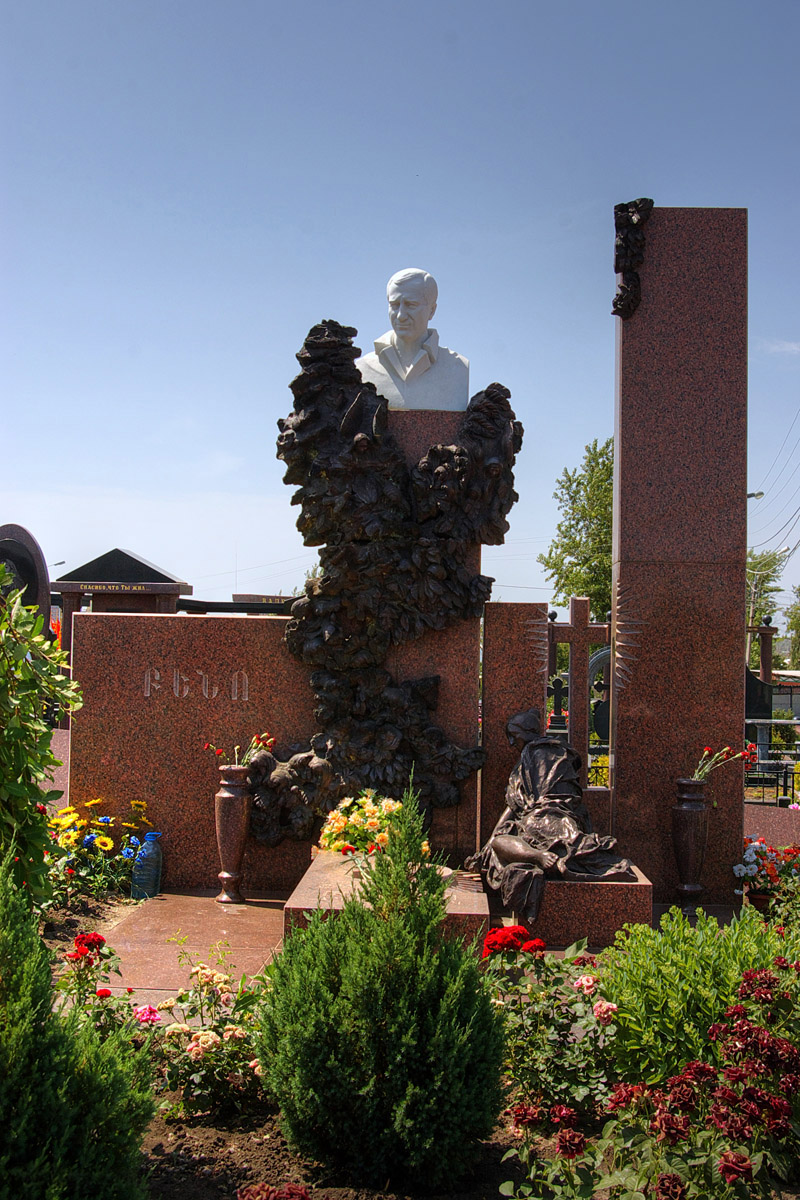
One of the monuments in luxury quarter
