= Franz Reichleitner =

Austrian perpetrator of the Holocaust (1906–1944)

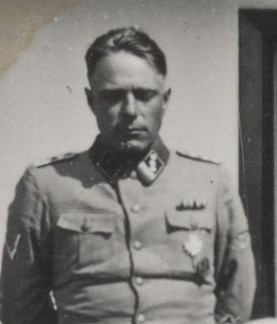
- Born: Franz Karl Reichleitner; 2 December 1906; Austria-Hungary
- Died: 3 January 1944 (aged 37); Fiume, Adriatic Littoral Zone
- Military career
- Allegiance: Nazi Germany
- Branch: Schutzstaffel
- Service years: 1937–1944
- Rank: SS-Hauptsturmführer
- Unit: SS-Totenkopfverbände
- Commands: Sobibór extermination camp, September 1942 — October 1943

Franz Karl Reichleitner (2 December 1906 – 3 January 1944) was an Austrian member in the SS of Nazi Germany who participated in Operation Reinhard during the Holocaust. Reichleitner served as the second and last commandant of Sobibór extermination camp from 1 September 1942 until the camp's closure on or about 17 October 1943. As the commanding officer of the camp, Franz Reichleitner directly perpetrated the genocide of Jews.

== SS career ==
Reichleitner joined the Nazi Party in 1936 as member number 6,369,213 and the Schutzstaffel (SS) in 1937 as member number 357,065. He began his career as a Kriminalsekretär of the Gestapo in Linz. Later Reichleitner was assigned to work in the Action T4 euthanasia program at the nearby Hartheim Euthanasia Centre. He first served as an assistant supervisor (together with Franz Stangl) under officer Christian Wirth before assuming Wirth's position of chief supervisor at Hartheim. Reichleitner was also partly responsible for getting Stangl a supervising job in T-4.

Reichleitner married Anna Baumgartner from Steyr.

== Sobibor death camp ==
On 1 September 1942, at the rank of SS-Obersturmführer (first lieutenant), on the orders of Wirth and Odilo Globocnik, Reichleitner took command of the Sobibór extermination camp with Franz Stangl's departure to Treblinka. Upon assuming command, he ordered that the bodies of those killed during Stangl's tenure be exhumed and burned. Camp inmates referred to him as "Idiot" (Trottel) because they did not know his name and he usually addressed them in this manner. Reichleitner rarely showed his face in the camp, and it has been claimed that he was a heavy drinker, but his command at Sobibór was even more strict than that of his predecessor. Moshe Bahir, a camp inmate, wrote:

Reichleitner, a man in his late forties, with an Austrian accent, was dressed always with great elegance and wore gloves. He did not have direct contact with the Jews and the transports. He knew that he could rely on his subordinates, who were very frightened of him. He ran the camp with German precision. During his time the Aktionen went smoothly, and all the transports that arrived on a certain day were liquidated. He never left them for the following day...

Reichleitner is estimated to have overseen the deaths of around 100,000 inmates during his time at Sobibór. On one occasion, when an old man from the transports slapped SS officer Karl Frenzel, Reichleitner took the man aside and shot him on the spot in front of his family and the entire convoy of people.

== Sobibor revolt ==
After Reichsführer-SS Heinrich Himmler visited Sobibór on 12 February 1943, he promoted Reichleitner to SS-Hauptsturmführer (captain). Reichleitner was on leave on the day of the successful Sobibór revolt, 14 October 1943. With about 300 of the 600 prisoners having escaped, the remainder were shot dead per the direct orders of Himmler. Sobibór was closed within a few days and the Nazis attempted to remove any traces of its existence.

In autumn 1943, like so many of the perpetrators of Operation Reinhard, Reichleitner was then transferred to the Fiume area of Italy to kill Jews and quell the partisan resistance movement there. Reichleitner was killed by partisans on 3 January 1944 at Fiume, Italy.

Military offices
Preceded by SS-Obersturmführer Franz Stangl	Commandant of Sobibór extermination camp 1 September 1942 — 17 October 1943	Succeeded by None
