= Johann Niemann =

German SS officer (1913–1943)

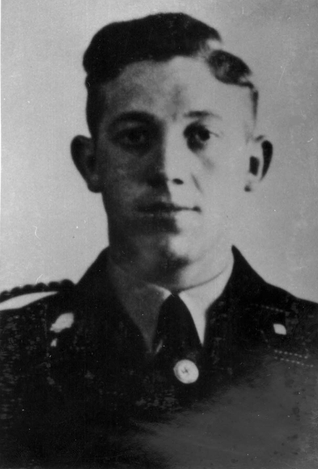
- Niemann c. 1941
- Born: 4 August 1913; Völlen, Westoverledingen, German Empire
- Died: 14 October 1943 (aged 30); Sobibor extermination camp, Lublin Voivodeship, German-occupied Poland
- Military career
- Allegiance: Nazi Germany
- Branch: Schutzstaffel
- Service years: 1934–1943
- Rank: SS-Untersturmführer
- Unit: SS-Totenkopfverbände
- Commands: Sobibor extermination camp

Johann Niemann (4 August 1913 – 14 October 1943) was a German SS officer and Holocaust perpetrator who was deputy commandant of Sobibor extermination camp during Operation Reinhard. He also served as a Leichenverbrenner (corpse cremator) at Grafeneck, Brandenburg, and Bernburg during the Aktion T4, the SS "euthanasia" program. Niemann was killed during the Sobibor prisoner uprising in 1943.

== SS career ==
Niemann joined the Nazi Party in 1931 as member number 753,836 and the SS in 1934 as member number 270,600. He first served at Bełżec extermination camp, where he commanded Camp II, the extermination area. He then was transferred to Sobibor extermination camp. Niemann was deputy commander of Sobibor on various occasions in 1942 before being given the position permanently in early 1943. After Heinrich Himmler's visit to Sobibor on 12 February 1943, Niemann was promoted to SS-Untersturmführer.

Karl Frenzel, also a commandant at Sobibor, recalled how Niemann handled a particular threat of prisoner revolt within the camp:

A Polish Kapo told me that some Dutch Jews were organizing an escape, so I relayed it to Deputy Commandant Niemann. He ordered the seventy-two Jews to be executed.

On 14 October 1943, a prisoner uprising took place at the Sobibor extermination camp. Niemann was the highest-ranking SS officer who was on duty that day, and so he was the first person targeted to be assassinated by the prisoners. During an appointment to be fitted for a leather jacket taken from a murdered Jew, Niemann was killed in the tailor's barracks with an axe to his head by Alexander Shubayev, a Jewish Red Army soldier imprisoned at Sobibor.

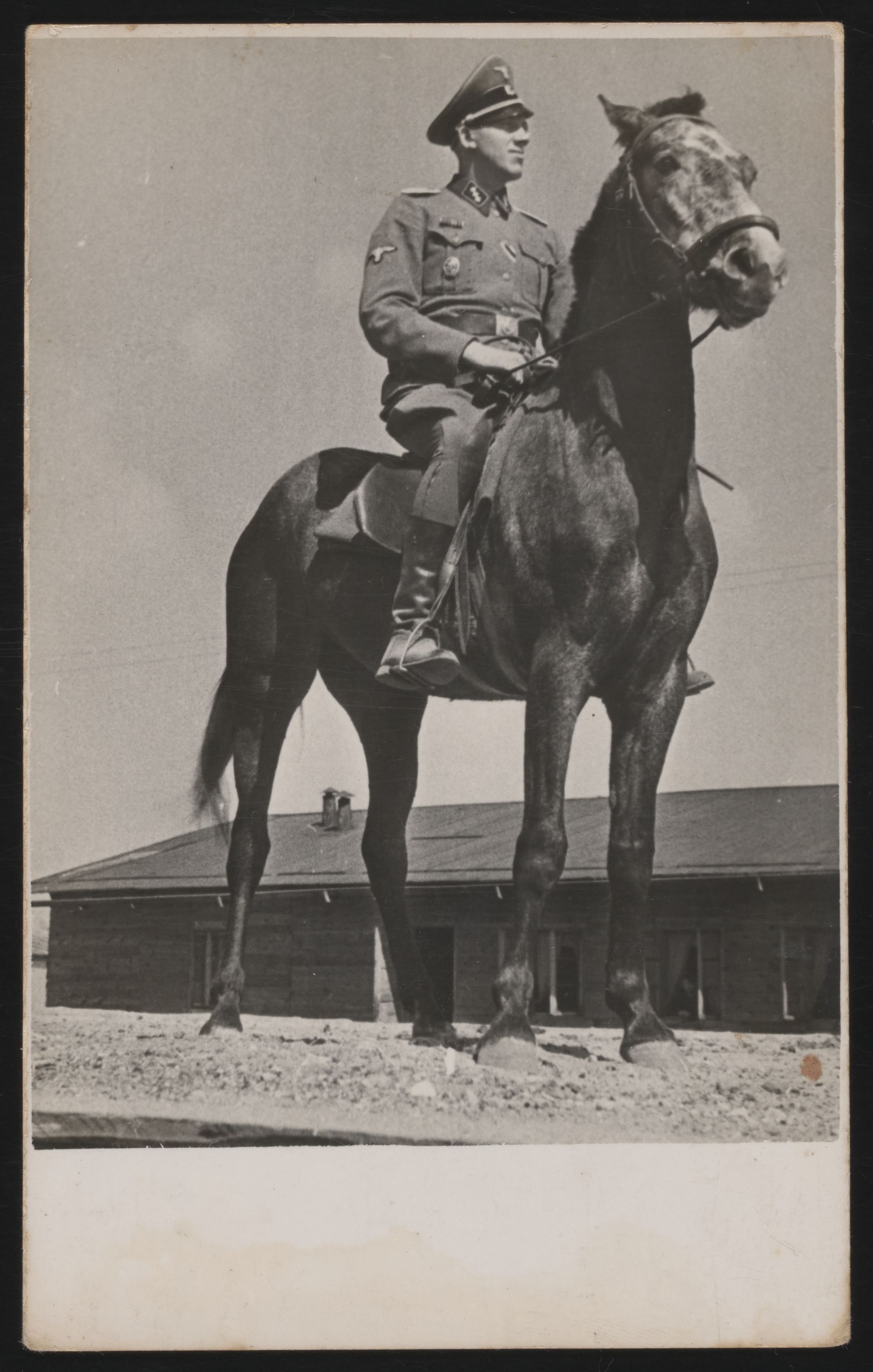
Niemann on his horse in Sobibór, from the Niemann album

In 2020, Niemann's wartime photo album was made public by his descendants. The collection of photographs is known as the Sobibor perpetrator album.

Niemann was played by Henry Stolow in the 1987 English film Escape from Sobibor, and by Maximilian Dirr in the 2018 Russian film Sobibor.

Niemann's Awards/Decorations and ranks in the SS and NSDAP (or Nazi Party) were as follows:

Ranks: SS-Unterscharführer, SS-Scharführer, SS-Oberscharführer, SS-Hauptscharführer, Niemann's last promotion to the rank of SS-Untersturmführer by SS-Reichsführer Heinrich Himmler on February 12, 1943.

Awards: DRL-Sports Badge in Bronze, War Merit Cross 2nd Class With Swords, Sudetenland Medal, Heer Long Service Medal.
