= Thomas Blatt =

Holocaust survivor (1927–2015)

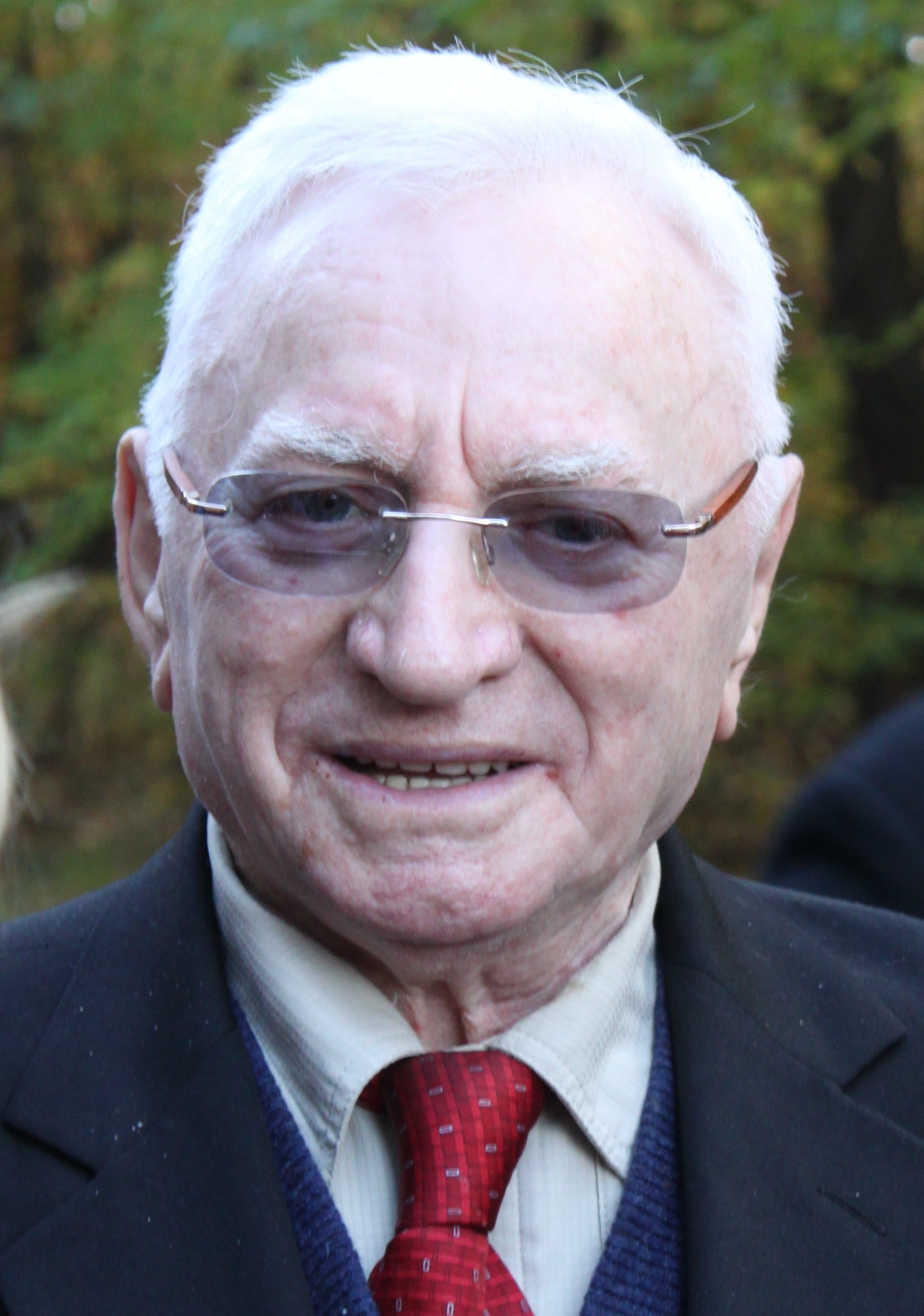
- Blatt in 2013
- Born: Tomasz Blatt; April 15, 1927; Izbica, Lublin Voivodeship, Second Polish Republic
- Died: October 31, 2015 (aged 88); Santa Barbara, California, U.S.
- Other names: Toivi Hersz Ber Blatt, Bolesław Stankiewicz, Tobiasz Blatt
- Known for: Survivor of the Sobibór extermination camp uprising
- Spouse(s): Teodozja Kowalik, Dena Blatt
- Children: Rena Blatt/Smith Leonard Blatt

Thomas "Toivi" Blatt (born Tomasz Blatt; April 15, 1927 – October 31, 2015) was a Holocaust survivor, writer of mémoires, and public speaker, who at the age of 16 escaped from the Sobibór extermination camp during the uprising staged by the Jewish prisoners in October 1943. The escape was attempted by about 300 inmates, many of whom were recaptured and killed by the German search squads. Following World War II Blatt lived in Poland until the Polish October. In 1957, he immigrated to Israel, and in 1958 settled in the United States.

== Life ==
Thomas "Toivi" Blatt was born on April 15, 1927, to a Jewish family in Izbica, Second Polish Republic, where his father Leon Blatt owned a liquor store. The population of the town was 90 percent Jewish at the time according to the Holocaust Encyclopedia. Tomasz (Toivi) also had a brother. During the occupation of Poland by Nazi Germany in World War II, his family was forced into the Izbica Ghetto created by the SS in 1941, the largest transit ghetto in the Lublin Reservation. In October 1942, the family decided to split up and leave Izbica to increase their chance of survival. Tomasz Blatt tried to reach Hungary. On the way he was captured and imprisoned, first in a prison in Stryj and then in the Ghetto Stryj. In early 1943, with the help of an acquaintance of his family, Blatt went back to Izbica to his parents and his brother. On April 28, 1943, Blatt was taken to Sobibór by truck with about 400 Jews from Izbica. Members of his family were killed there on arrival. Thomas (age 16) along with 40 young men was selected to join the Arbeitsjuden in the Lower, and later, the Upper Camp, where he cut the hair of naked women before gassing.

During the one year and a half in which the Sobibór killing centre operated, at least 167,000 people were murdered there, according to the United States Holocaust Memorial Museum; virtually all of the victims were Jews, mostly from Poland, France and the Netherlands. Other estimates range from 200,000 (Raul Hilberg) to 250,000 (Dr. Aharon Weiss, and Czesław Madajczyk).

=== Escape from Sobibór ===
Blatt was among some 300 prisoners who escaped from the camp during the uprising staged by the Sobibór underground on October 14, 1943.

=== Work in the communist security service ===
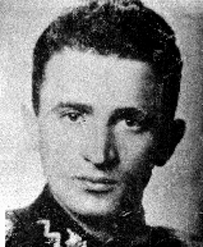
Blatt in Poland a.k.a. Tobiasz Blatt / Bolesław Stankiewicz wearing uniform of an officer of the Department of Security (UB), the communist secret police.

In his biography, he stated that in 1944, he joined the NKVD. Then, from 1945, he worked at the Polish Ministry of Public Security in Gliwice. In 1947–1948, he studied at the Central School of Political Officers in Lodz, after which he continued working in the Ministry of Public Security.

=== Emigration ===
In 1957, Blatt emigrated from Poland to Israel and in 1958 settled in the United States. In the late 1970s and 1980s, he worked for Richard Rashke, an American journalist and author who wrote the Escape from Sobibor first published in 1982. Blatt was commissioned by Rashke to help him locate and interview Sobibór survivors for the story of the revolt.

Blatt also did his own research. In 1983, he interviewed Karl Frenzel after his release from prison, a Nazi German who had been third in command at Sobibór. Frenzel, convicted at trial and sentenced to life in prison for his actions at the camp, was released on appeal after serving 16 years. Blatt later claimed that his interview was the first one after World War II in which an extermination camp survivor spoke face-to-face with a camp functionary.

The 1983 book by Rashke was adapted into the award-winning 1987 television film, Escape from Sobibor. It portrayed the events leading up to, and including the uprising in Sobibór. Blatt served as a technical adviser on the film. The revolt leaders Leon Feldhendler and Alexander Pechersky, as well as other camp prisoners including Blatt were played by actors. The film was directed by Jack Gold and shot in Yugoslavia.

Blatt wrote two books about Sobibór. His first mémoire, From The Ashes of Sobibor (1997), is about his life before the war and the German occupation of Izbica leading up to the deportation of his family to the Sobibór death camp. His second mémoire titled Sobibor: the forgotten revolt (1998) also based on his own experience and supplementary research, and written with the help of his son Leon Blatt, describes the story of the prisoner revolt of October 14, 1943, as remembered by Alexander Pechersky and others. The book material was used as the source for his personal website by the same name.

Blatt lived in Santa Barbara, California. In the 2005 BBC documentary Auschwitz: The Nazis and 'The Final Solution', Blatt claimed that he returned to his old home to find that it, like so many former Jewish residences, had been taken over. He visited the home again several years later, only to find that the new owner had essentially destroyed the home, apparently assuming that Blatt's first visit was to reclaim hidden treasure.

Blatt died at his home on October 31, 2015, at the age of 88.
