= Gustav Wagner =

Austrian SS member (1911–1980)

- Born: Gustav Franz Wagner; 18 July 1911; Vienna, Austria-Hungary
- Died: 3 October 1980 (aged 69); Atibaia, Brazil
- Military career
- Allegiance: Nazi Germany
- Branch: Schutzstaffel
- Service years: late 1930s—1945
- Rank: SS-Hauptscharführer
- Nicknames: The Beast, Wolf (Yiddish: װעלפֿל, Volf)
- Unit: Death's Head Units
- Commands: Sobibor extermination camp
- Awards: War Merit Cross 2nd Class With Swords (1942–1943)

Gustav Franz Wagner (18 July 1911 – 3 October 1980) was an Austrian member of the SS with the rank of Master Sergeant (Hauptscharführer). Wagner was a deputy commander of Sobibor extermination camp in German-occupied Poland, where 200,000–250,000 Jews were murdered in the camp's gas chambers during Operation Reinhard. Due to his brutality, he was known as "The Beast" and "Wolf".

== Biography ==
Wagner was born in Vienna, Austria. He served as a soldier in the Austrian army from 1928 and joined the then illegal Nazi Party in 1931 as member number 443,217. After being arrested for proscribed National Socialist agitation, he fled to Germany, where he joined the SA and later the Schutzstaffel in the late 1930s, serving as a guard at an unknown concentration camp.

He had a daughter named Krista Wagner who later married Egon Wassermann. Her granddaughter would later convert to Judaism. Her granddaughter married Gidon who had studied Holocaust history at university.

In May 1940, Wagner was part of the Aktion T4 euthanasia program at Hartheim killing centre with administrative functions and cremating the bodies of murdered patients. Due to his experience in T4, Wagner was assigned to help establish the Sobibor extermination camp in March 1942 and oversaw the construction of the camp. Once the gassing installation, barracks, and fences were completed, Wagner became deputy commandant of the camp under Commandant Franz Stangl. His official title was quartermaster-sergeant of the camp.

Wagner was in charge of selecting which prisoners from the newly arrived transports would be used as slave laborers in and outside the camp, from among the newly arrived ghetto inhabitants. When Wagner was on vacation or attending to duties elsewhere, Karl Frenzel assumed his role within the camp.

More than any other officer at Sobibor, Wagner was responsible for the daily interactions with prisoners. Survivors of the camp described him as a cold-blooded sadist. Wagner was known to beat and thrash camp inmates on a regular basis, and to kill Jews without reason or restraint. Inmate Moshe Bahir described him:

He was a handsome man, tall and blond — a pure Aryan. In civilian life he was, no doubt, a well-mannered man; at Sobibor he was a wild beast. His lust to kill knew no bounds... He would snatch babies from their mothers' arms and tear them to pieces in his hands. I saw him beat two men to death with a rifle, because they did not carry out his instructions properly, since they did not understand German. I remember that one night a group of youths aged fifteen or sixteen arrived in the camp. The head of this group was one Abraham. After a long and arduous work day, this young man collapsed on his pallet and fell asleep. Suddenly Wagner came into our barrack, and Abraham did not hear him call to stand up at once before him. Furious, he pulled Abraham naked off his bed and began to beat him all over his body. When Wagner grew weary of the blows, he took out his revolver and killed him on the spot. This atrocious spectacle was carried out before all of us, including Abraham's younger brother.

Erich Bauer later remarked:

I estimate that the number of Jews gassed at Sobibor was about 350,000. In the canteen at Sobibor I once overheard a conversation between Karl Frenzel, Franz Stangl and Gustav Wagner. They were discussing the number of victims in the extermination camps of Belzec, Treblinka and Sobibor and expressed their regret that Sobibor "came last" in the competition.

Also according to Bauer, Wagner participated in gang rapes of female prisoners prior to killing them:

I was blamed for being responsible for the death of the Jewish girls Ruth and Gisela, who lived in the so-called forester house. As it is known, these two girls lived in the forester house, and they were visited frequently by the SS men. Orgies were conducted there. They were attended by [Kurt] Bolender, [Hubert] Gomerski, Karl Ludwig, Franz Stangl, Gustav Wagner, and Steubel. I lived in the room above them and due to these celebrations could not fall asleep after coming back from a journey....

Inmate Eda Lichtman wrote that on the Jewish fast day of Yom Kippur, Wagner appeared at roll call, selected some prisoners, gave them bread and forced them to eat it. As the prisoners ate the bread, Wagner laughed loudly, enjoying his joke because he knew that these Jews were pious.

One of the Sobibor prisoners improvised a song which ironically described camp life (original text with English translation):

Wie lustig ist da unser Leben
Man tut uns zu essen geben
Wie lustig ist im grünen Wald
Wo ich mir aufhalt

Translation:

How joyful is our life there
They give us food to eat that's fair
How joyful it is in the green wood,
Where I am staying.

Wagner enjoyed this song and he forced the prisoners to sing it frequently.

After two Jews escaped from Sobibor in the spring of 1943, Wagner was put in charge of a squad of soldiers from the Wehrmacht, who laid minefields around the camp so as to prevent further escapes. However, these efforts did not prevent another escape, which took form in the Sobibor revolt. Wagner was not present at the camp on the day of the Sobibor revolt on 14 October 1943, having taken a holiday with his then wife Karin to celebrate the birth of a daughter, Marion. The inmates knew of Wagner's absence and believed that it would improve their chances of success. Wagner was considered the strictest in terms of prisoner supervision at the camp. After the successful revolt, Wagner was ordered to aid in closing the camp. He helped to dismantle and remove evidence of the camp by ruthlessly commanding the Jewish prisoners who performed this task. For instance, after the Arbeitsjuden "worker Jews" had been transported from Treblinka and had successfully torn down the Sobibor barracks, Wagner killed them.

Heinrich Himmler considered Wagner to be "one of the most deserving men of Operation Reinhard" (German: einer der verdientesten Männer der Aktion Reinhard).

After Sobibor, Wagner was transferred to Italy, where he participated in the deportation of Jews with other staff from the extermination camps and T4.

== After World War II ==
Initially unknown, Wagner, disguising himself as a regular military motorcyclist, was held and then released from a prisoner of war camp. He found labouring work on houses and eventually was sentenced to death in absentia. Franz Stangl by chance passed Wagner as he worked on a building site demolishing a house and Wagner immediately joined his former commandant and crossed into Italy. Clergy at the Collegio Teutonico di Santa Maria dell'Anima sheltered both men in Rome and arranged for them to leave for Syria via the Ratlines. Later both men with Stangl's wife and children fled to Brazil, where Wagner was admitted as a permanent resident and eventually issued a Brazilian passport under the name of "Günther Mendel". He worked as a house-helper for a wealthy Brazilian family and then as a maker of concrete fence posts on a farm. He married a local woman who was a widow and raised her children and lived outside São Paulo.

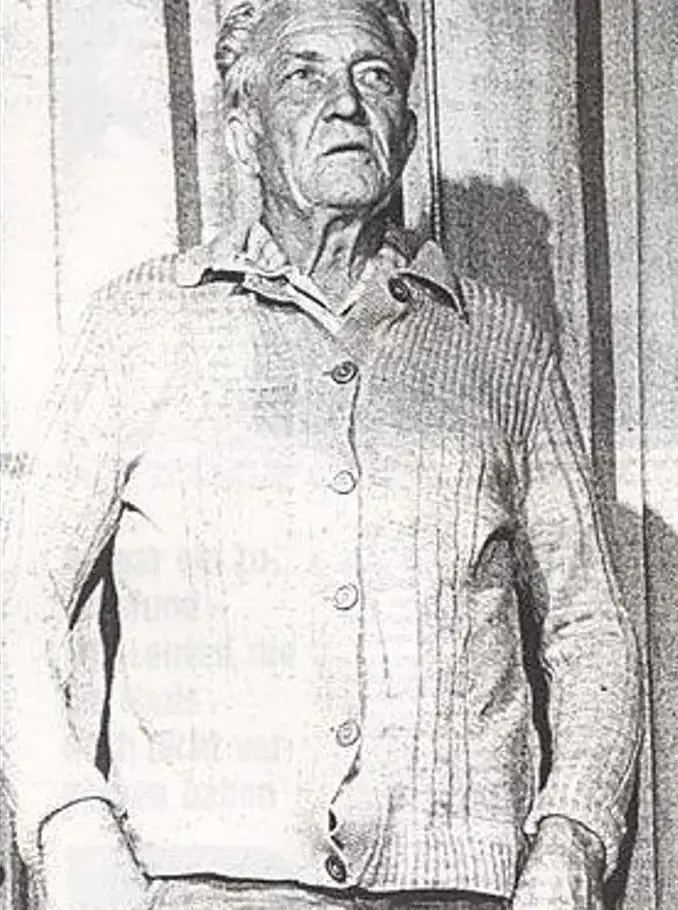
Gustav Franz Wagner

Wagner was arrested on 30 May 1978 after an investigation by Simon Wiesenthal. When Stangl had been put on trial in Germany, he testified that Wagner was living in Brazil, but the Brazilian police failed to locate him. When a journalist showed Wiesenthal a photograph of a group of German-Brazilians celebrating Hitler's eighty-ninth birthday, Wiesenthal falsely identified one of the men as Wagner, thinking that he could spook Wagner into fleeing and inadvertently revealing himself. However, Wagner instead surrendered himself to the Brazilian authorities, who then refused extradition requests from Israel, Austria, Yugoslavia, West Germany, and Poland.

Wagner, in a 1979 BBC interview, showed no remorse for his activities in running the camp, remarking:

I had no feelings. ... It just became another job. In the evening we never discussed our work, but just drank and played cards.

In October 1980, Wagner was found dead with a knife in his chest in Atibaia. Wagner's attorney reported his death as a suicide though Stanisław Szmajzner, a former Sobibor inmate who had been called to identify Wagner after his arrest, implied to Jules Schelvis and Richard Rashke that there had been more to the story. Several historians, including Rashke himself, have speculated that Szmajzner himself killed Wagner. Wagner's date of death was determined to be 3 October 1980.
