= Jules Schelvis =

Dutch Jewish historian (1921–2016)

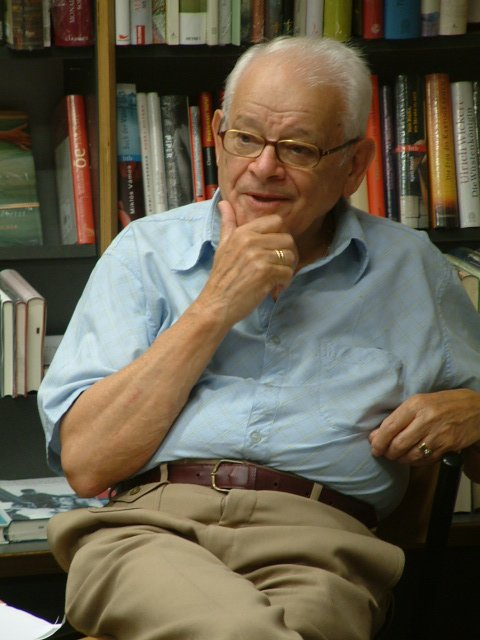
- Schelvis in 2006
- Born: 7 January 1921; Amsterdam, Netherlands
- Died: 3 April 2016 (aged 95); Amstelveen, Netherlands
- Occupations: Historian; author; Nazi hunter
- Spouse: Rachel Borzykowski (m. 1940; died 1943)

Jules Schelvis (7 January 1921 – 3 April 2016) was a Dutch Jewish historian, writer, printer, and Holocaust survivor. Schelvis was the sole survivor of the 3,006 people that were on the 14th transport from Westerbork to Sobibor extermination camp, having been selected to work at nearby Dorohucza labour camp. He is known for his memoirs and historical research about Sobibor, for which he earned an honorary doctorate from the University of Amsterdam, Officier in the Order of Orange-Nassau, and Order of Merit of the Republic of Poland.

Schelvis was born in Amsterdam, part of a secular Jewish family. After high school, he trained as a printer and worked for Printing Office Lindenbaum in Amsterdam. He worked at various newspapers and participated in a local youth labour organization, where he met and courted a woman named Rachel Borzykowski(1923-1943) who was a seamstress by profession. Schelvis grew close to Borzykowski and her family, whose residence was a local center of Yiddish culture. Schelvis and Borzykowski married on 18 December 1941. It was a double wedding since Borzykowski's sister Hella married Abraham Stodel at the same place and time. Each couple thought it would be a good opportunity to bring their friends and families close together through the occasion of a matrimonial wedding. They opted for this because the times were uncertain. No one knew if such a gathering would be possible if they delayed.

The measures of the German occupation authorities initially began to target 'foreign Jews' with the intention of sowing discord within the Jewish community. After the strikes organised by the Dutch Underground in February 1941 the situation began to radicalise. The Germans carried out an impromptu raid inside the Jewish quarter of Amsterdam on 22 February 1941, and arrested 427 men who were sent to Mauthausen concentration camp. Against this backdrop of fear Schelvis and Borzykowski decided to marry in the hope that this would protect her and her Polish Jewish immigrant family from deportation.

However, Schelvis and his family, including his wife Rachel Borzykowski and her sister Hella and her husband Abraham Stodel were rounded up in Amsterdam on 26 May 1943. They were deported to Westerbork transit camp, where they spent six days before being sent to Sobibor extermination camp. They were among the 3,006 Dutch Jews on the 14th transport to Sobibor which left Westerbork on 1 June 1943.

The transport from Westerbork to Sobibor took three days. At the Sobibor arrival ramp, Schelvis was selected with Abraham Stodel to join a work unit (Arbeitskommando) sent to Dorohucza labor camp. The rest of his family and the Borzykowskis were gassed immediately, including his wife Rachel Borzykowski and her sister Hella.At Dorohucza, Polish and Dutch Jews were forced to work in abominable conditions building latifundia for Generalplan Ost.

On 30 November 1943 Abraham Stodel died through hunger and exhaustion. Schelvis survived because he asked for a meeting with the camp commandant, who happened to be aware that another nearby labor camp needed a printer. However, for unclear reasons, Schelvis was instead sent to Lublin airfield camp, where he was forced to build barracks under the supervision of the DAW (Deutsche Ausrüstungswerke), the official organization responsible for slave labour in military-related projects.

After serving in the camp he was transferred to the Radom Ghetto, where he was tasked with reassembling a printing press which had been disassembled for transport from Warsaw. Conditions in Radom were significantly better than Schelvis had experienced in Lublin or Dorohucza, although the Ghetto was later designated and used as an outer-work camp (Außenlager) for the main concentration camp (Stammlager) Lublin-Majdanek.

With the Red Army approaching, the SS decreed the 'evacuation' of the work camp. Around 3, 000 Jewish male and female prisoners, including children, were sent away between 26 and 29 June 1944. Schelvis was among them. The conditions deteriorated into what became a death march. The bedraggled column struggled on to Tomaszów Mazowiecki, where they were temporarily housed in a disused silk factory. Schelvis speaks in his recollections to US-Lieutenant Reginald C. Burroughs (1911-2001), of intense hunger and of lice running rife.

From Tomaszów the bedraggled group were packed away in goods waggons and sent on by rail in crammed conditions to Auschwitz.There they arrived after a 3-day journey. The SS decreed that the men were to be separated from the women. The latter were taken away with all the children under 12. They were never seen again.

The remaining men and youths were extremely undernourished. Their skeletal figures were placed back in the goods waggons. According to Schelvis's immediate post-war recollections with Lieutenant Burroughs it took a 6 day journey by rail to eventually arrive in Vaihingen near Stuttgart. Many died along the way, particularly as a result of undernourishment and illness.

Vaihingen was designated as an outer-work camp (Außenlager) for the concentration camp of Natzweiler. Here the horror and maltreatment of human beings did not end.Schelvis describes to Lieutenant Burroughs (See NARA, RG549, Box 532, Case 000-50-45) how severe the work conditions were. Also he mentions the daily intake consisted of 300g of bread and 2 litres of watery soup. The newly arrived had to work in an underground site for aircraft production.

Schelvis tells of the brutality of the regime in Vaihingen. The camp commandant SS-Oberscharführer Kurt Möller (1918-1948) was a vicious sadist and went by the nickname of 'Bonebreaker' ('Knochenbrecher'). A typhus epidemic broke out and hundreds died. Between 35 and 40 died on a daily basis. Schelvis estimates how the eventual death toll in Vaihingen at that time was perhaps around 1800. There was much work to do for the 'Totenkommando,' the brigade consisting of Jewish prisoners that had to clear away the dead. Schelvis recalls some of their names: Zelik Potaznik (1917-*), Mayer Lebowski (1922-2007) and Jakub Finkelstein (1921-*).

At the beginning of April 1945 the SS decreed the 'evacuation' of the camp. Those too weak and no longer able to work were left in the barracks to their own fate as the typhus epidemic took its toll. Schelvis was among 500 men left able to work. As the SS prepared yet another 'death march', the Free French Army arrived on 8 April 1945 and liberated the camp.

"After 2 years I was free," so recalled Schelvis in his address to Lieutenant Burroughs. After the war he returned to Amsterdam, arriving there on 30 June 1945, although he could never forget his terrible experiences, especially the loss of his wife Rachel. Later he did manage to remarry and tried to begin his life anew whilst accepting the need to comprehend his experiences. He turned to writing and from the beginning of the 1980s devoted his research to the memory of those who died in the extermination camp of Sobibor.

Schelvis has written the standard work over the history of the camp.In 2005 there appeared an edition in German ('Eine Reise durch die Finsternis' - 'A Journey through the Darkness'). During his last years he gave talks and lectures and held informal gatherings with German teenagers through visiting schools and university establishments. He was a plaintiff and expert witness during the trials of Karl Frenzel, John Demjanjuk and of other Holocaust perpetrators. His earlier tormentor, the sadist SS-Oberscharführer Kurt Möller, responsible for countless deaths in Oranienburg, Sachsenhausen, Auschwitz, Lublin, Radom and Vaihingen, was brought to trial in 1948. He was convicted of his crimes and hanged in Lublin.

Schelvis was the founder of Stichting Sobibor as well as the author of several memoirs and historical studies about Sobibor.

== Notable works ==
- Sobibor: A History of a Nazi Death Camp (2014) Bloomsbury Academic. ISBN 978 14 7258 906 4
- Vernietigingskamp Sobibor (1993) Amsterdam: Bataafsche Leeuw. ISBN 978 90 6707 629 6
- Binnen de poorten, 1995, Amsterdam: Bataafsche Leeuw. ISBN 978 90 6707 369 1
- Sobibor. Transportlijsten, 2001, Amsterdam: Bataafsche Leeuw. ISBN 90 6707 516 7
