= Karl Frenzel =

German Nazi war criminal (1911–1996)

- Born: Karl August Wilhelm Frenzel; 20 August 1911; Zehdenick, German Empire
- Died: 2 September 1996 (aged 85); Garbsen, Germany
- Military career
- Awards: Honor Chevron for the Old Guard
- Other work: Carpenter, stage lighting technician
- SS career
- Allegiance: Nazi Germany
- Service years: 1930–1945 (SA)
- Rank: SS-Oberscharführer
- Unit: SS-Totenkopfverbände
- Commands: Sobibor extermination camp

Karl August Wilhelm Frenzel (20 August 1911 – 2 September 1996) was a German SS noncommissioned officer in Sobibor extermination camp.

After the Second World War, he was convicted and sentenced to life imprisonment for war crimes, but he was ultimately released after serving 16 years in prison.

== Early life ==
Frenzel was born in Zehdenick, Templin on 20 August 1911. His father had worked for the railroad and was a local official of the Social Democratic Party of Germany. Karl completed primary school from 1918 to 1926 in Oranienburg and then apprenticed as a carpenter. Meanwhile, he was a member of the socialist carpenter's union. However, after passing the qualifying carpentry exam in 1930 he found himself unemployed. Later, he found work for a short time as a butcher.

The Nazi Party promised that there would be more jobs after its seizure of power, a reason that motivated Frenzel to join both the party and the Sturmabteilung (SA) in August 1930. His brother, a theology student, had joined the party the previous year. His father joined the party in 1934. Frenzel claimed that anti-Semitism was an aspect of the politics to which they were indifferent. He later claimed that he was appalled by the early persecution of Jews in Germany.

In 1929, at the age of 18, Frenzel met his first girlfriend, who was Jewish. Their relationship dissolved after two years when her father heard that Frenzel was a Nazi Party member. She and her family emigrated to the United States in 1934.

Frenzel served in the auxiliary police force as part of the SA, during the summer of 1933. Through his party connections, he then obtained positions first as a carpenter and later as a custodian.

In 1934, Frenzel married his wife. Both were Christians. They married in a church and went to church "if not every Sunday, at least every other or third Sunday". All of their five children were baptized. They bought the furniture for their new home from a Jewish merchant. Towards the end of the war, in 1945, Frenzel's wife was raped by Soviet soldiers. She developed abdominal typhus and died soon afterward.

== Action T4 ==
At the start of the Second World War, Frenzel was drafted into the Reich Labour Service. However, he was soon released because he had many children to support. His brothers were in the army, and he felt left out of the action. Responding to an appeal to loyal party members, Frenzel applied for special service in the military through his SA unit but instead was assigned to Action T4, the Nazi program to kill people with disabilities. When the Wehrmacht later called for his service, T4 prevented his transfer.

Along with other T4 recruits, Frenzel reported to the Columbia Haus in late 1939, where he was first checked for political reliability and then watched a film on the supposed degeneration of handicapped people. He first worked in the laundry and as a guard at Grafeneck Castle and worked in construction at Bernburg Euthanasia Centre, and he finally became a stoker at Hadamar Euthanasia Centre. As a stoker, he was responsible for removing the dead bodies from the gas chambers, breaking out gold teeth and burning the bodies, as well as various other tasks around the gas chambers and crematoria.

It has been speculated that Frenzel helped in the design of the gas chambers at Hadamar. Like his colleagues, that was Frenzel's first experience with gassing and burning people, which proved useful later in the extermination camps. On 20 April 1942, he was assigned to Operation Reinhard and sent to Sobibor extermination camp.

== Sobibor ==
Frenzel served at Sobibor for the duration of its operation and assisted in both its construction and its demolition. At Sobibor, he served as commandant of Lager I, the area in which Jewish prisoners lived and performed forced labour. He also commanded the Bahnhofkommando who greeted arriving transports. He served as Gustav Wagner's replacement as the quartermaster-sergeant of the camp when Wagner was attending to duties elsewhere or was on leave. Frenzel selected prisoners from the newly arrived transports to work inside and outside the camp and, in effect, also selected the vast majority who would go to the gas chambers. In that capacity, Frenzel carried out genocide by taking part in the industrial-scale extermination of hundreds of thousands of men, women and children as part of Operation Reinhard for which he was tried and convicted in December 1966.

Frenzel claimed that when he received his orders, he was told that Sobibor was merely a work camp, which he had to guard. When he found out the camp's true nature, he was forbidden from discussing it with anyone, as it was to be kept a state secret. The penalty was imprisonment at a concentration camp or death.

Frenzel freely used his whip on inmates without reservation. In the spring of 1943, after two Jews from Chelm had escaped from the camp, the staff consulted among themselves, and Frenzel announced the verdict that every tenth prisoner at the morning roll call would be executed. Frenzel personally walked along the lines of the roll call and pulled the victims out of line to be shot at Camp III. Twenty prisoners were shot as a reprisal for the two who had escaped.

Erich Bauer, one of the commanders of Camp III, stated: "He [Frenzel] was one of the most brutal members of the permanent staff in the camp. His whip was very loose". For instance, in spring 1943, when a worker prisoner tried to take his own life and was found dying, Frenzel shouted that Jews had no right to kill themselves; only Germans had the right to kill. Frenzel whipped the dying man and killed him with a bullet. A Sobibor survivor, Hershel Cukierman, described Frenzel as "a sadist and a killer without conscience. His involvement at Sobibor went much beyond the mass exterminations; he committed numerous other crimes as well".

The historian and Holocaust survivor Jules Schelvis gave the following evaluation of Frenzel's tenure:

His lust for power over defenceless people was mirrored by an equally great need to ingratiate himself to his superiors. As his power grew, so did his willingness blindly to follow orders – and to do more besides. He wanted to be regarded as the perfect SS man by his superiors and fellow camp staff alike. Once a man of little significance, at Sobibor he relished his position as one of the most important men. The realization that he was lord and master of the [work Jews], to know that they were at his disposal, that he could do with them as he pleased, aroused the lowest instincts in him. He wanted to do more than he was asked to do; he wanted to use the opportunity to carry on a personal reign of terror by humiliating and torturing the [work Jews], beating them into submission, and to kill them or have them killed. He took great pleasure in it.

When Frenzel was convicted in 1966, the judges concluded:

...aided by his eager and deliberate active participation, an undetermined number of Jews, but at least 151,000, were killed, in the main through gassing. The others were killed by various other means. He terrorized the prisoners, mocking them with his loud voice and deriving sadistic pleasure from thrashing them with his leather whip. He saw to it that the sick and disabled were taken from the Rampe to the Lazarett and duly executed. From time to time he also checked the state of progress in the barracks where the women had to undress and get their hair cut off, just before they perished in the gas chambers. He was commandant of Lager 1, or the Arbeitsjudenlager, as well as the Bahnhofskommando, and formed the labour commandos after taking roll call. As deputy Lagerspiess, he had considerable power. He did not dispute the fact that he had used his own discretion in executing his function, taking decisions of life and death without consulting camp commanders first.

Frenzel later admitted that he had been harsh but insisted that he had always been fair. At his trial, he declared, "I actually do believe the Jews even liked me!" During the trial, Frenzel claimed that he had tried to avoid direct participation in the extermination process. For instance, when he was put in charge of the trolley that transported Jews to the gas chambers, he protested. Frenzel stated:

After the disembarking of the train, the children and the feeble Jews were forcibly thrown onto the trolley. Terrible scenes happened then. The people were separated from their families, pushed with rifle butts, lashed with whips. They cried dreadfully, so I could not cope with this task. Reichleitner complied with my request, and he appointed Bredow to escort the trolley.

Erich Bauer later remarked:

I think that the number of Jews gassed at Sobibor was about 350,000. In the canteen at Sobibor I once overheard a conversation between Karl Frenzel, Franz Stangl and Gustav Wagner. They were discussing the number of victims in the extermination camps of Belzec, Treblinka and Sobibor and expressed their regret that Sobibor "came last" in the competition.

After the prisoner revolt of 14 October 1943, Frenzel helped in dismantling the camp. He was then sent to participate in Sondertruppe R in Trieste and Fiume, which confiscated the houses of deported Jews in Italy.

== Arrest and trial ==
As the war ended, he was arrested by United States troops at a prisoner-of-war camp near Munich but was soon released. Frenzel found work in Frankfurt as a stage lighting technician. On 22 March 1962, on a break at work, he was again identified, arrested and brought to trial along with other former SS officers at the Sobibor trial on 6 September 1965.

The official charge brought against Frenzel was the personal murder of 42 Jews and participation in the murder of approximately 250,000 Jews.

Frenzel justified his activity at Sobibor:

As I already pointed out, under the prevailing war conditions, which are now difficult to comprehend, I unfortunately believed that what was going on in Sobibor was lawful. To my regret, I was then convinced of its necessity. I was shocked that just during the war, when I wanted to serve my homeland, I had to be in such a terrible extermination camp. But then I thought very often about the enemy bomber pilots, who surely were not asked whether they wanted to carry out their murderous flights against German people in their homes in such a manner.

On 20 December 1966, Frenzel was sentenced to life imprisonment for personally murdering six Jews and for his participation in the mass murder of a further 150,000 Jews as kommandant of Lager I. He was released on a technicality in 1982, tried again and again sentenced to life imprisonment on 4 October 1985. Because of his advanced age and poor health, the sentence was not imposed, and he was released.

The Sobibor survivor Thomas Blatt was among those called to testify as a witness against Frenzel at the post-war trial, and when Blatt travelled to the court venue city, Blatt and Frenzel met at a hotel to discuss historical questions and technical details about camp operation for the history of the uprising Blatt was then writing. The event is presumably the only time that a Nazi death camp supervisor was interviewed by a death camp prisoner. In the years after the war, Frenzel frequently expressed remorse for his actions but explained that he had simply complied with his duty. He renounced his belief in the Nazi Party:

Ever since 1945, I have been cursing the Nazis — for everything, for what they did, and everything they stood for. I fought against the devil. Since 1945 I have refrained from any involvement in politics.

== Death ==
Karl Frenzel spent the last years of his life in a retirement home in Garbsen near Hannover, where he died on 2 September 1996.

== Quotes ==
In a 1983 interview, Frenzel — who was at the camp from its inception to its closure — admitted the following about Sobibor:

Poles were not killed there. Gypsies were not killed there. Russians were not killed there ... only Jews, Russian Jews, Polish Jews, Dutch Jews, French Jews.

When my children and friends ask me whether it is true, I tell them yes, it is true. And when they say, but this is impossible, then I tell them again, it is really true. It is wrong to say that it never happened.

== Depictions ==
In the 1987 movie Escape from Sobibor, Frenzel was played by Kurt Raab.

Frenzel's role as Sobibor Subcamp I Commandant was featured in the PBS TV Movie Escape from a Nazi Death Camp (2014)

Christopher Lambert played Frenzel in the Russian movie Sobibor (2018).
