= Siegfried Graetschus =

German SS functionary (1916–1943)

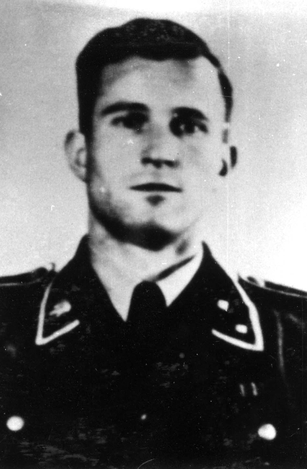
- Born: 9 June 1916; Tilsit, East Prussia, German Empire
- Died: 14 October 1943 (aged 27); Sobibor extermination camp, Lublin Voivodeship, German-occupied Poland
- Military career
- Allegiance: Nazi Germany
- Branch: Schutzstaffel
- Rank: Oberscharführer
- Unit: Sobibor

Siegfried Graetschus (9 June 1916 – 14 October 1943) was a German SS functionary at the Sobibor extermination camp during Operation Reinhard, the deadliest phase of the Holocaust in occupied Poland. He was assassinated by a prisoner during the Sobibor uprising.

Graetschus joined the SS in 1935 and the Nazi Party in 1936. He served at Bernburg Euthanasia Centre and Treblinka extermination camp before being posted to Sobibor in August 1942. He succeeded Erich Lachmann as commander of the approximately 200 Ukrainian Trawniki guards at Sobibor. He was known for his brutality and his murderous nature. At the very beginning Siegfried Graetschus transformed a confiscated post car into a mobile gas chamber. The vehicle was used for some time to murder people with disabilities and the mentally ill who were searched for in nearby villages. Finally it was decided not to use it more widely and to use stationary gas chambers instead.

Graetschus was killed during the prisoner revolt at Sobibor. While sources agree that he was killed in the shoemaker's barracks with an axe to the head, they differ as to whether the fatal blow was struck by Yehuda Lerner, a Varsovian Jew, or by Arkady Wajspapir, a Jewish Russian Red Army soldier. In an interview for Sobibor, October 14, 1943, 4 p.m., Lerner claims that he killed Graetschus.
