= List of survivors of Sobibor =

Survivors of the Nazi extermination camp Sobibor

This is a list of survivors of the Sobibor extermination camp. The list is divided into two groups. The first comprises the 58 known survivors of those selected to perform forced labour for the camp's daily operation. The second comprises those deported to Sobibor but selected there for forced labor in other camps.

== Survivors among Sobibor's forced labourers ==
This list is as complete as current records allow. There were 58 known Sobibor survivors: 48 male and 10 female. Except where noted, the survivors were Arbeitshäftlinge, inmates who performed slave-labour for the daily operation of the camp, who escaped during the camp-wide revolt on October 14, 1943.

The vast majority of the people taken to Sobibor did not survive but were shot or gassed immediately upon arrival. Of the Arbeitshäftlinge forced to work as Sonderkommando in Lager III, the camp's extermination area where the gas chambers and most of the mass graves were located, no one survived.

Name	Birth	Death	Age at Death	From	Ethnicity	Arrival	Other names/spellings	Notes
Schlomo Alster	December 1, 1908	March 1992	83	Chełm, Poland	Jewish	November 1942 (approximately)		Worked as a carpenter, and served on the Bahnhofskommando. Emigrated to Rehovot, Israel.
Moshe Bahir	July 19, 1927	2002	75	Płock, Poland	Jewish	May 24, 1942, from Zamość	Changed name from Moshe Szklarek.	Worked in provisions barracks, in the Bahnhofskommando, and as a barber. Emigrated to Israel, where he wrote a testimony for the Ghetto Fighter's House and testified at the Eichmann Trial.
Antonius Bardach	May 16, 1909	1959 (approximately)	50	Lemberg, Poland	Jewish	March 30, 1943 from Drancy, France.		Later settled in Belgium.
Philip Bialowitz	December 25, 1925	August 6, 2016	90	Izbica, Poland	Jewish	January 1943 or April 28, 1943	Surname also "Białowicz". First name sometimes "Fishel" or "Fiszel".	Brother of Symcha Bialowitz. Worked in sorting barracks and provisions barracks, and as a barber and Bahnhofskommando member. Emigrated to the US and co-authored the memoir A Promise At Sobibor with his son Joseph.
Symcha Bialowitz	December 6, 1912	February 2014	101	Izbica, Poland	Jewish	April 28, 1943		Brother of Philip Bialowitz. Worked in the Waldkommando and in the camp pharmacy. Participated in the revolt. Married a survivor from Zamość and settled in Israel.
Jakob Biskubicz	March 17, 1926	February 8, 2002	76	Hrubieszów, Poland	Jewish	May 1942 or June 1942		Was unloading a truck full of vodka for SS Erich Bauer when the revolt began. Hid in Camp IV and escaped that night. Joined the Parczew partisans and later settled in Israel, where he gave testimony in the Eichmann trial.
Thomas "Toivi" Blatt	April 15, 1927	October 31, 2015	88	Izbica, Poland	Jewish	April 23, 1943	Name also rendered as Toivi Blatt and Tomasz Blatt. Used the Polish name Bolesław Stankiewicz for a short period after the war.	Escaped over the fence in the Vorlager. Witness in post-war trials. Wrote Sobibor memoir From the Ashes of Sobibor and history Sobibor: The Forgotten Revolt. Worked as an assistant to Richard Rashke in writing Escape from Sobibor and acted as a consultant on the movie adaptation. Interviewed Karl Frenzel.
Herschel Cukierman	April 15, 1893	July 15, 1979	86	Kurów, Poland	Jewish	May 1942	Hershel Zuckerman, including in Escape from Sobibor.	Father of Josef Cukierman. Arrived with wife and daughters who were gassed on arrival. Worked as a gardener before the war, but told the SS that he was a cook in order to be selected for work. Had an excellent memory which helped him identify SS officers in postwar trials.
Josef Cukierman	May 26, 1930	June 15, 1963	33	Kurów, Poland	Jewish	May 1942 from Opole Lubelski Ghetto	Joseph Zuckerman	Son of Herschel Cukierman. Worked with his father in the kitchens. After the war, lived in Stuttgart before moving to Karlsruhe.
Josef Duniec	December 21, 1912	December 1, 1965	52	Równo, Poland	Jewish	March 25, 1943		Sent to Sobibor from Drancy, having emigrated to France in 1932 in order to study chemistry. Moved to Israel after the war, where he died of a heart attack the day before he was expected to testify at the Sobibor trial.
Leon Cymiel	February 20, 1924	1997	73	Chełm, Poland	Jewish	Spring 1943	Leon Szymiel	Stayed in Poland after war. Testimony available at ushmm.org
Chaim Engel	January 10, 1916	July 4, 2003	87	Brudzew, Poland	Jewish	November 6, 1942		Killed SS-Oberscharführer Rudolf Beckmann during the revolt. Escaped with Selma Wijnberg-Engel and survived the rest of the war in hiding. The two later married and moved to Connecticut.
Selma Engel-Wijnberg	May 15, 1922	December 4, 2018	96	Zwolle, Netherlands	Jewish	April 9, 1943	Saartje Engel, Selma Engel, Saartje Wijnberg, Selma Wijnberg, Selma Wynberg	Worked in the sorting barracks and Waldkommando. Escaped with Chaim Engel during the revolt. They survived the rest of the war in hiding together. The two later married.
Leon Feldhendler	1910	April 6, 1945	34 or 35	Żółkiewka, Poland	Jewish	early 1943	First name sometimes Lejb or Lejba. Surname sometimes Felhendler.	One of the co-organizers of the revolt. After fighting as a partisan, made his way back to Lublin, where he was murdered under disputed circumstances.
Dov Freiberg	May 15, 1927	2008	80	Warsaw, Poland	Jewish	May 15, 1942	First name also Berek.	Deported to Sobibor from Krasnystaw, where he had been sent from the Warsaw Ghetto. After the revolt, hid with Simeon Rosenfeld after the revolt. Gave testimony at the Eichmann trial. Author of memoir "To Survive Sobibor".
Catharina Gokkes	September 1, 1923	June 22, 1944	21	Netherlands	Jewish	April 9, 1943	First name also Kitty, Katty, Kathy.	Was shot in the leg by Karl Frenzel during the escape. Joined Parczew partisans but was killed before liberation.
Mordechai Goldfarb	March 15, 1920	June 8, 1984	64	Piaski, Poland	Jewish	November 6, 1942	First name also Moshe.	Worked as a sign painter in Sobibor. Joined the Parczew partisans after the revolt and later settled in Israel.
Josef Herszman	1925	2005	80	Żółkiewka, Poland	Jewish	1942		Worked in the sorting barracks. Later moved to Israel. Gave testimony at war crime trails.
Moshe Hochman	March 15, 1935	June 8, 1993	58	Żółkiewka, Poland	Jewish	April 1942		Worked as the foreman in the tailor's shop. He hid Niemann's body after getting him to try on a new jacket.
Zyndel Honigman	April 10, 1910	July 1989	79	Kiev, Ukraine	Jewish	November 1942		Escaped from the camp twice. Taken to Sobibor in November 1942 from Gorzków near Izbica, he escaped by crawling under a fence. Was captured and sent back in April 1943, where he worked in the kitchen and in the forest brigade. Escaped from the forest brigade and joined the Parczew partisans.
Abram Kohn	July 25, 1910	January 19, 1986	75	Łódź, Poland	Jewish	May 1942	Abraham Kohn	Worked in the kitchens, the sorting barracks, and forest brigade. Later moved to Australia.
Josef Kopp		1944 or 1945		Biłgoraj, Poland	Jewish			Allegedly escaped by killing a Ukrainian guard on July 27, 1943 while on duties outside of the camp in the nearby village of Zlobek; did not survive World War II.
Chaim Korenfeld	May 15, 1923	August 13, 2002	79	Izbica, Poland	Jewish	April 28, 1943		Worked in the forest brigade. Unclear whether he escaped with the forest brigade or in the ultimate revolt. Later moved to Italy, then Brazil.
Chaim Powroznik		unknown		Polish	Jewish			Testimony available. (Note: The statement in French is available in PDF in NIOD Toegang 804, Inventaris 18, page 56ff.)
Chaim Leist	Unknown	October 2005		Żółkiewka, Poland	Jewish	April 23, 1943	Lajst	Little is known about him except that he worked in Sobibor as a gardener and that he settled in Israel after the war.
Samuel Lerer	October 1, 1922	March 3, 2016	93	Żółkiewka, Poland	Jewish	May 1942	Szmuel	Worked in the stables and later in the Erbhof, taking care of chickens and ducks. During the revolt, he escaped with Ester Raab and hid with a friend of her family. In 1949, he and Raab encountered Sobibor "gasmeister" Hermann Erich Bauer in Berlin, leading to his arrest. Moved to New York City and became a cab driver.
Yehuda Lerner	July 22, 1926	2007	81 years	Warsaw, Poland	Jewish	September 1943	Jehuda Lerner, sometimes went by "Leon"	He and Arkady Wajspapir killed two guards, SS-Oberscharführer Siegfried Graetschus and Volksdeutscher Ivan Klatt during the revolt. Joined the Parczew partisans and later settled in Israel. Interviewed extensively in the documentary Sobibor, October 14, 1943, 4 p.m.
Ada Lichtman	January 1, 1915	1993	78	Jarosław, Poland	Jewish	June 1943	Eda Fisher, Eda Lichtman	Worked in the laundry and as a knitress, where she was regarded as a "surrogate mother" to other prisoners. Joined the Parczew partisans. Moved to Israel, married another survivor, and gave testimony at the Eichmann trial.
Jitschak Lichtman	December 10, 1908	1992	83 or 84	Żółkiewka, Poland	Jewish	May 15, 1942	Itzhak Lichtman	Joined the Parczew partisans. Married Ada Lichtman (Fischer).
Yefim Litwinowski	May 25, 1921	January 29, 1993	71	Soviet	Jewish	September 22, 1943		Red Army soldier in Pechersky's group. Was a participant of the uprising and subsequently rejoined the Red Army.
Abraham Margulies	January 25, 1921	1984	62 or 63	Żyrardów, Poland	Jewish	late May 1942		Worked in the Bahnhofskommando, as well as kitchens and sorting barracks. Joined the Parczew partisans with Hela Felenbaum-Weiss, then emigrated to Israel, where he worked as a printer.
Chaskiel Menche	January 7, 1910	1984	73 or 74	Koło, Poland	Jewish	June 1942		Worked in sorting barracks then as a shoe shiner and hat maker. Emigrated to Australia after the war.
Mojzesz Merenstein	January 15, 1899	December 1985	86	Polish	Jewish			Worked with Felhendler to plan revolt.
Zelda Metz	May 1, 1925	1980	54 or 55	Siedliszcze, Poland	Jewish	December 20, 1942	Zelda Kelbermann	Cousin of Regina Zielinski. Worked as a knitress and in the laundry. Went to Lviv after the escape, where pretended to be Catholic and worked as a nanny. Emigrated to the US in 1946.
Alexander Pechersky	February 22, 1909	January 19, 1990	80	Ukrainian	Jewish	September 22, 1943	Sasha Pechersky	Chief organizer and leader of the revolt. Red Army soldier who joined the Parczew partisans.
Nachum Platnitzky	1913	unknown		Belarusian	Jewish		Surname also listed as Plotnikow;	Lived in Pinsk, Belarus after the war.
Shlomo Podchlebnik	February 15, 1907	February 1973	66	Polish	Jewish	April 28, 1943		He and Josef Kopp escaped by killing a Ukrainian guard on July 27, 1943 while on duties outside of the camp in the nearby village of Zlobek.
Gertrud Poppert–Schönborn	June 29, 1914	Nov 1943	29	German	Jewish		Luka, Loeka	Identified by Jules Schelvis as likely identity of "Luka". Presumed dead following mass escape.
Esther Raab	June 11, 1922	April 13, 2015	92	Polish	Jewish	December 20, 1942	Née Terner, she became known as Esther Raab after her 1946 marriage to Irving Raab.	She identified gas chamber executioner Erich Bauer after the war in Berlin, leading to his arrest.
Simjon Rosenfeld	October 10, 1922	June 3, 2019	96	Soviet	Jewish	September 22, 1943	Semion Rosenfeld, Semyon Rosenfeld, Semion Rozenfeld.	Red Army soldier under Pechersky's command. Was separated from the other Russians and survived in hiding. Rejoined the Red Army and fought in the Battle of Berlin, where he carved the name "Sobibor" into the wall of the Reich Chancellery. Returned to the Soviet Union, but eventually emigrated to Israel.
Ajzik Rotenberg	1925	1994	69	Polish	Jewish	May 12, 1943		Joined the Parczew partisans. Murdered in 1994 in Israel by two Palestinian terrorists.
Joseph Serchuk	1919	November 6, 1993	74	Polish	Jewish		Surname also spelled Serczuk.	Brothers Joseph and David Serchuk escaped the day after arriving when on forest duty.
David Serchuk		1948		Polish	Jewish		Surname also spelled Serczuk.	Brothers Joseph and David Serchuk escaped the day after arriving when on forest duty.
Alexander Shubayev		1945		Belarusian	Jewish		Often referred to in accounts by the nickname "Kali Mali".	Red Army soldier. Killed deputy commandant Johann Niemann with an axe to his head. Joined the Parczew partisans after escaping the camp, but was killed.
Ursula Stern	August 28, 1926	September 19, 1983	57	German	Jewish	April 9, 1943	Changed her name to Ilana Safran after the war.	Joined the Parczew partisans. Witness at Hagen trial.
Stanisław Szmajzner	March 13, 1927	March 3, 1989	61	Polish	Jewish	May 12, 1942	Shlomo Smajzner, Szlomo Smajzner	Goldsmith and machinist in Sobibor. Made the knives used in the revolt, and also stole rifles. Shot a guard in one of the guard towers. After escaping, joined the Parczew partisans and eventually emigrated to Brazil where he worked as an executive in a paper factory. Testified against Franz Stangl, and identified Gustav Wagner at a police station in Goiana.
Boris Tabarinsky	1917	2004		Belarusian	Jewish	September 22, 1943		Job was to cut the barbed wire fence as a backup exit.
Kurt Ticho	April 11, 1914	June 8, 2009	95	Czech	Jewish	November 6, 1942	Kurt Thomas	Worked as a nurse in Sobibor. After the war, he brought charges against SS officers Hubert Gomerski and Johann Klier.
Israel Trager	March 5, 1906	August 1, 1969	63	Polish	Jewish	Mar 1943	Shrulke	Camp bricklayer and Bahnhofkommando train station worker. After the war moved to Israel.
Aleksej Waizen	May 30, 1922	January 14, 2015	92	Ukrainian	Jewish	autumn 1943		Worked in sorting room.
Arkady Wajspapir	1921	January 11, 2018	96	Russian	Jewish	September 22, 1943		He and Jehuda Lerner killed two guards with axe blows, SS-Oberscharführer Siegfried Graetschus and Volksdeutscher Ivan Klatt, during the revolt. A Red Army soldier, he joined the Parczew partisans.
Abraham Wang	January 2, 1921	1978	57	Polish	Jewish	Apr 23, 1943		Escaped on Jul 27, 1943, along with four other prisoners.
Hela Felenbaum-Weiss	November 25, 1925	December 1988	63	Polish	Jewish	December 20, 1942		Joined the Parczew partisans; later joined the Red Army.
Kalmen Wewryk	June 25, 1906	Unknown		Polish	Jewish	November 1942		Joined partisans after the revolt.
Regina Zielinski	September 2, 1924	September 2014		Polish	Jewish	December 20, 1942	Née Feldman	Worked as a knitter in Sobibor. After the war, married a Polish Catholic army officer and settled in Australia. Her son wrote a book "Conversations with Regina" which recounts her experiences as well as his own later-in-life discovery of his Jewish origins and his mother's status as a Holocaust survivor.
Meier Ziss	November 15, 1927	2003		Żółkiewka, Poland	Jewish	May 1942		Arrived on one of the first transports. After the war, he moved to Venezuela and then to Israel, where he worked in electronics.

== Survivors among those selected at Sobibor for forced labour in other camps ==
Selections sometimes took place at the point of departure, often well before people were forced to board the trains, but there are also reports of selections from trains already en route to the camps. In his June 20, 1942 report, Revier-Leutnant der Schutzpolizei Josef Frischmann, in charge of the guard unit on the train, wrote that "51 Jews capable of work" were removed from the transport at Lublin station. The train had departed Vienna on June 14, 1942, ostensibly for Izbica, but the remaining 949 people on board were delivered to their final destination in Sobibor. (Note: A facsimile of Frischmann's Erfahrungsbericht can be found in NIOD Toegang 804, Inventaris 54, page 175. A description of this transport, including a list of names of the deportees, can be found at Yad Vashem.)

The precise number of those spared upon arrival in the Sobibor extermination camp is unknown, but there were occasional selections there, for forced labour in other camps and factories, amounting to a total of several thousand people. Many of those selected subsequently perished due to harsh conditions in the slave-labour details. A number of them were murdered after internal selections, following transfers to Majdanek and Auschwitz, where people were also routinely murdered by hanging or shooting for arbitrary offences. Thousands of Jews initially selected for slave-labour were among those killed in the Lublin district during Aktion Erntefest, and many were shot or succumbed on the death marches in the closing stages of the Nazi regime. However, some of the people selected at Sobibor ultimately survived beyond the total defeat and unconditional surrender of the Nazis in May 1945.

On August 17, 1943, a survivor from Sabinov in Slovakia, who has remained anonymous, wrote a report in which he described his selection in Sobibor, together with approximately 100 men and 50 women, upon arrival. For slave-labour in the drainage works in the vicinity of Sobibor they were taken to Krychów. He had arrived following the violent clearance of deported Slovak Jews and the few remaining Polish Jews from the Rejowiec ghetto on August 9, 1942. He described how a few additional skilled workers, technicians, blacksmiths and watchmakers were separated upon arrival in Sobibor. He further wrote that fire was visible in the night sky in the vicinity of Sobibor, and that the stench of burning hair permeated the air. (Note: A German and English transcript of the statement is available in PDF in NIOD Toegang 804, Inventaris 54, page 148ff.)

Approximately 1,000 people were selected from the 34,313 named deportees who had been deported from the Netherlands via Westerbork to Sobibor between March 2 and July 20, 1943. Only 16 of them, 13 women and three men, survived. (Note: Including Selma Wijnberg and Ursula Stern, who remained in the camp until their successful escape during the revolt, there are 18 known survivors from the transports out of Westerbork to Sobibor who were alive after May 8, 1945: Elias Isak Alex Cohen, Judith Eliasar, Bertha Ensel, Celina Ensel, Sophia Huisman, Mirjam Penha née Blits, Cato Polak, Surry Polak, Suzanne Polak, Bertha van Praag, Debora van Praag, Jules Schelvis, Sophia Verduin, Jetje Veterman, Sientje Veterman and Jozef Wins. In early reports Jeannette de Vries née Blitz is included among the survivors, bringing the preliminary total to 19, a number repeated in some later publications. Jeannette de Vries-Blitz was not deported to Sobibor, however. She was deported to Auschwitz on May 19, 1944. From there her path through various camps paralleled that of Mirjam Penha-Blits and Judith Eliasar. They were liberated in the Neuengamme sub camp in Salzwedel.) From the group of approximately 30 women selected from the train which left Westerbork with 1,015 people on March 10, 1943, 13 survived the various camps. (Note: Among those who were selected at Sobibor from the March 30, 1943 transport, but perished before May 8, 1945 are: Henderiene den Arend-van der Reis, Auguste Berliner, Flora Blok, Hilde Beate Blumendal, Marga Cohen, Sophia Cohen, Hester Fresco, Klaartje Gompertz, Fanny Landesmann, Naatje Roodveldt-Moffie, Lotje Stad, Judith Swaab, Annie Troostwijk-Hijmans, Lena Verduin, and Charlotte Zeehandelaar-Andriesse.) Although they were split up after arrival in Lublin and returned to the Netherlands via different camps and routes, this was the largest single group of survivors from any one of the 19 trains which departed the Netherlands. Upon arrival they were separated from the other deportees and shortly afterwards taken by train to Lublin, where they spent the next months in various work details divided over Majdanek and the Alter Flugplatz camp, on the site of an airfield. Eventually, eleven of the women were transferred to Milejów, where they worked for a brief period in a Wehrmacht operated provisions factory, but were soon taken to Trawniki, with a larger group of men and women of mixed nationality, in the immediate aftermath of Aktion Erntefest in November 1943. Here, their first assignment was assisting in body disposal and sorting the looted possessions of those murdered at the Trawniki camp. After body disposal had nearly been completed, the remaining men were also murdered. Elias Isak Alex Cohen was the only survivor of the March 17, 1943 transport. He was taken to Majdanek with a group of approximately 35 people selected based on profession. His experiences include a period operating machinery in the ammunition factory in Skarżysko-Kamienna, where the poisonous materials and lack of protections decimated the forced-labourers. Jozef Wins was the only one to return to the Netherlands from the May 11 transport. He was among a group of 80 men taken to Dorohucza. Jules Schelvis was the sole survivor of the 3,006 people on the deportation train of June 1, 1943, He too was taken to Dorohucza, with a group of 80 other men. From the remaining 14 trains, people were also selected but no one survived the Holocaust.

== See also ==
- List of victims of Sobibor
