= Sobibor (disambiguation) =

Sobibor extermination camp was a World War II German death camp.

Sobibor may also refer to:

- Sobibór (village), Polish village near death camp
- Sobibor (film), 2018 Russian film

== See also ==
- Sobibor trial, 1965–66 judicial trial of death camp personnel
- Sobibór Museum, Polish museum at site of death camp
- Sobibór Landscape Park, protected ecological area in Poland
- Escape from Sobibor, 1987 British television film
- Sobibor, October 14, 1943, 4 p.m., 2001 French documentary
- List of victims of Sobibor
- List of survivors of Sobibor
