= Krychów =

- Village
- Location within Poland
- Coordinates: 51°25′06″N 23°21′31″E
- Country: Poland
- Voivodeship: Lublin
- County: Włodawa
- Gmina: Hańsk

Krychów pronounced [ˈkrɨxuv] is a village neighbourhood (Polish: kolonia) in the administrative district of Gmina Hańsk, within Włodawa County, Lublin Voivodeship, in eastern Poland. In 1975–98 the settlement belonged administratively to Chełm Voivodeship.

== World War II ==
During occupation of Poland in World War II, Krychów was the location of a Nazi forced labour camp established in 1940 for the Polish Jews, with several sub-camps.

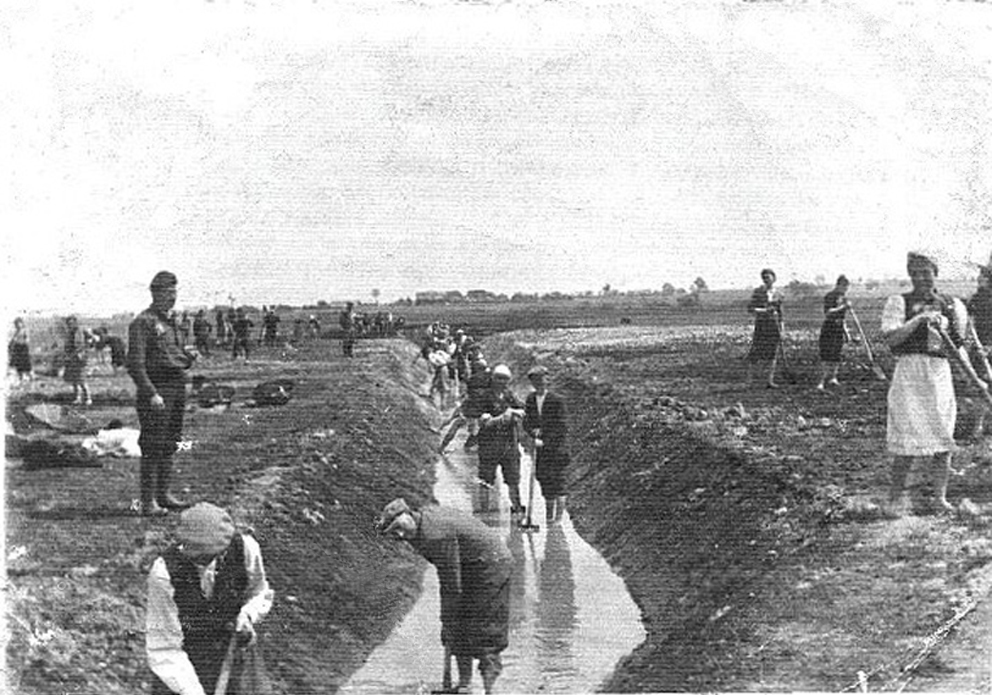
Krychów forced labour camp, 1940. Polish Jewish prisoners build irrigation ditches for the new German latifundia of Generalplan Ost. Most were sent to Sobibór afterwards.

The camp in Krychów was set up by the Germans in place of a small correctional facility for short-term offenders founded in 1935 in interwar Poland, which was a branch of the Chełm prison. The prewar inmates were released by Polish administration already at the time of the invasion of Poland in the first days of September 1939 and the correctional centre stood empty. The Germans set up a Jewish camp there for around 1,500 men and women who were forced to build farms for the German "colonists". It was a main branch of several camps in Gmina Hańsk including Krychów, Hańsk-Dwór, Osowa, and Ujazdów, for the innocuous captives expelled from the neighbouring settlements.

The camp in Krychów was managed by the Nazi German administration of the General Plan East preparing latifundia for the colonists brought in Heim ins Reich (Home into the Empire) from among the foreign Volksdeutsche. Due to proximity of the Sobibór extermination camp many of the Jews who dug the irrigation ditches in these camps were simply marched under the German guard for extermination by gassing at Sobibór, along with the imprisoned Romani people.

== Geography ==
Krychów is located at the heart of Pojezierze Łęczyńsko-Włodawskie characterized by profusion of marshlands and meadows. There is less arable land here than in other areas of the central-Polish lowland. It is a legally protected area, a part of the Sobibór Landscape Park criss-crossed with hiking and biking trails for tourists.
