= Stolpersteine in Pardubice Region =

Memorial installation in Czech Republic

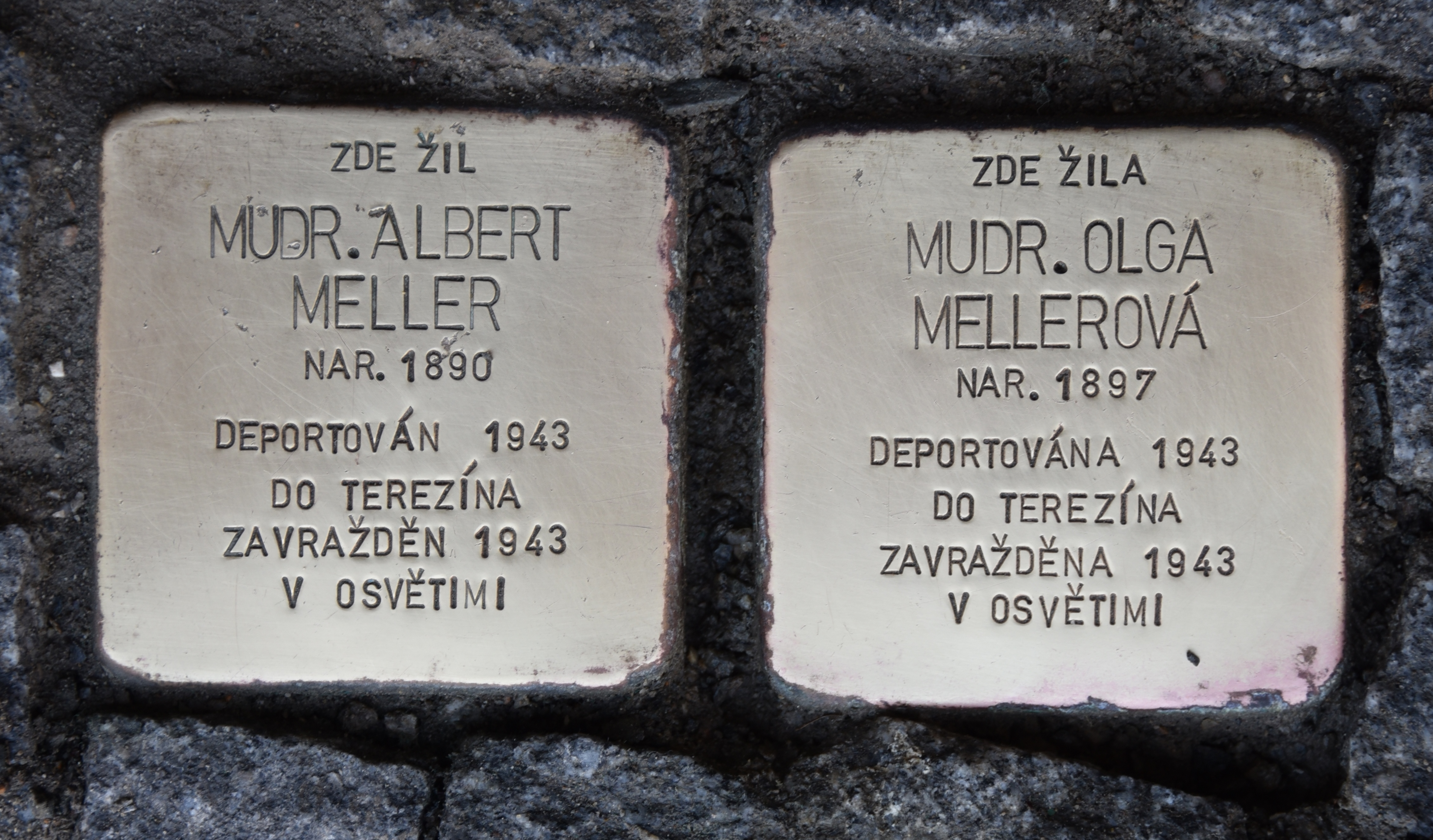
Stolpersteine for a physician's couple from Svitavy, murdered in 1943 at Auschwitz

This article lists the Stolpersteine in the Pardubice Region (Czech: Pardubický kraj; Polish: Kraj pardubicki) in the east of Bohemia. Stolpersteine is the German name for stumbling blocks collocated all over Europe by German artist Gunter Demnig. They remember the fate of the Nazi victims being murdered, deported, exiled or driven to suicide.

Generally, the stumbling blocks are posed in front of the building where the victims had their last self chosen residence. The name of the Stolpersteine in Czech is: Kameny zmizelých, stones of the disappeared.

The lists are sortable; the basic order follows the alphabet according to the last name of the victim.

== Chrudim ==
The Stolpersteine of Chrudim were collocated by Gunter Demnig on 19 September 2017.

| Stone | Inscription | Location | Life and death |
|---|---|---|---|
| | HERE LIVED; JIŘÍ ADLER; BORN 1938; DEPORTED 1942; TO AUSCHWITZ; MURDERED 15.12.1943 | | Jiří Adler |
| | HERE LIVED; OTTO ADLER; BORN 1891; DEPORTED 1942; TO BUCHENWALD; MURDERED 1944 | | Otto Adler |
| | HERE LIVED; BLANKA ADLEROVÁ; BORN 1933; DEPORTED 1942; TO AUSCHWITZ; MURDERED 15.12.1943 | | Blanka Adlerová |
| | HERE LIVED; PAVLA ADLEROVÁ; BORN 1906; DEPORTED 1942; TO AUSCHWITZ; MURDERED 15.12.1943 | | Pavla Adlerová |
| | HERE LIVED; MUDR. ARTUR; PACHNER; BORN 1874; DEPORTED 1942; TO AUSCHWITZ; MURDERED 29.1.1944 | | MUDr. Artur Pachner |
| | HERE LIVED; GABRIELA; PACHNEROVÁ; BORN 1881; DEPORTED 1942; TO AUSCHWITZ; MURDERED 18.12.1943 | | Gabriela Pachnerová |
| | HERE LIVED; OLGA ŘÍHOVÁ; BORN 1904; DEPORTED 1943; TO AUSCHWITZ; MURDERED 12.9.1943 | | Olga Říhová |
| | HERE LIVED; JUDR. RICHARD; SCHMIDL; BORN 1882; DEPORTED 1942; TO AUSCHWITZ; MURDERED 2.2.1943 | | JUDr. Richard Schmidl |
| | HERE LIVED; EMIL SEIDLITZ; BORN 1877; DEPORTED 1942; TO AUSCHWITZ; MURDERED 22.1.1943 | | Emil Seidlitz |
| | HERE LIVED; FRANTIŠKA; SEIDLITZOVÁ; BORN 1877; DEPORTED 1942; TO AUSCHWITZ; MURDERED 12.2.1943 | | Františka Seidlitzová |
| | HERE LIVED; IRMA VTÍPILOVÁ; BORN 1898; DEPORTED 1942; TO AUSCHWITZ; MURDERED 23.1.1943 | | Irma Vtípilová née Weiss was born on 5 April 1898 in Kameničky to Jindrich Weiss (1856-1922) and Josefa née Iltisova (1861-1926). She had seven siblings. She was married to Frantisek Vtipil. The couple had two children. On 5 December 1942 she was deported from Pardubice to Theresienstadt concentration camp by transport Cf. Her transport number was 314. On 23 January 1943 she was deported from there to Auschwitz-Birkenau by transport Cr, Train Da 103. Her transport number was 1133. She was murdered there upon arrival. In 1944, her son Jaromir took his life in Chrudim in order to avoid deportation. Four of her siblings were also murdered in the course of the Shoah: her sister Olga Cervinka and her brothers Artur, Milan and Karel. |

== Slatiňany ==
At the time of the Protectorate of Bohemia and Moravia, 16 people of Jewish faith lived in Slatiňany. The first Jewish victim was Zikmund Klopper, who died in 1939 during an interrogation. The first deportations took place on 15 September 1942, the last one on 5 December 1942. Marie and Rudolf Lengsfeld committed suicide and thus escaped the deportations. Only Max Stránský returned from the concentration camps. A memorial plaque in Slatiňany commemorates 20 people who lost their lives between 1938 and 1945, including 15 Jews.

On 15 August 2018 Gunter Demnig collocated six Stolpersteine in Slatiňany.

| Stone | Inscription | Location | Life and death |
|---|---|---|---|
| | HERE LIVED; ERVÍN HERRMANN; BORN 1928; DEPORTED 1942; TO AUSCHWITZ; MURDERED 1943 | | Ervín Herrmann was born on 5 February 1928. He was the son of Gustav Herrmann and Vilma Herrmannová. He had an older brother named Otto. He was deported on 5 December 1942 along with his parents with transport Cf from Pardubice to Theresienstadt concentration camp. His transport number was 353. On 23 January 1943, he was deported by transport Cr to Auschwitz concentration camp - together with his parents and his brother, who had arrived in Theresienstadt already in August of 1942. His transport number was 1142. Ervín Herrmann, his parents and his brother were all murdered in Auschwitz in 1943. |
| | HERE LIVED; GUSTAV HERRMANN; BORN 1896; DEPORTED 1942; TO AUSCHWITZ; MURDERED 1943 | | Gustav Herrmann |
| | HERE LIVED; OTTO HERRMANN; BORN 1926; DEPORTED 1942; TO AUSCHWITZ; MURDERED 1943 | | Otto Herrmann |
| | HERE LIVED; VILMA HERRMANNOVÁ; BORN 1894; DEPORTED 1942; TO AUSCHWITZ; MURDERED 1943 | | Vilma Herrmannová |
| | HERE LIVED; HELENA STRÁNSKÁ; BORN 1899; DEPORTED 1942; TO AUSCHWITZ; MURDERED 1944 | | Helena Stránská |
| | HERE LIVED; PAVEL STRÁNSKÝ; BORN 1887; DEPORTED 1942; TO AUSCHWITZ; MURDERED 1944 | | Pavel Stránský |

== Svitavy ==
The Stolpersteine in Svitavy were collocated by the artist himself on 15 September 2014.

| Stone | Inscription | Location | Life and death |
|---|---|---|---|
| | HERE LIVED; ARNOŠT FREUND; BORN 1911; DEPORTED 1941; TO THERESIENSTADT; MURDERED 1942; IN CAMP IZBICA | Náměstí Míru 97; 49°45′23″N 16°27′59″E | Arnošt Freund was born on 23 September 1911. His father was Emil Freund. He had at least one sister, Louise, born 1916, later married as Hermanová. He was a school mate of Oskar Schindler. He became a dentist and was married to Irmina or Irma née Strumpf. The couple had a son - Jiří, born on 11 December 1937. The family lived in Brno. On 2 December 1941 he, his wife and his son were deported from Brno to Theresienstadt concentration camp with transport G. Their numbers on this transport were 64, 65 and 66 of 1,001. From there on 25 May 1942 he was transferred, again with his family, to the Izbica Ghetto with transport Az. Their numbers on this transport were 583, 584 and 585. With this train, 997 people were deported, only one survived. Arnošt Freund, his wife and his 4 years old son were murdered. Also his father became a victim of the Shoah, his sister could survive. |
| | HERE LIVED; EMIL FREUND; BORN 1878; DEPORTED 1942; TO THERESIENSTADT; MURDERED 1942; IN AUSCHWITZ | Náměstí Míru 97; 49°45′23″N 16°27′59″E | Emil Freund was born on 1 September 1878 in Ubušín. He was a trader for menswear. He married. The couple had two children, Arnošt (born 1911) and Louise (born 1916). Either 1918 or 1919 his wife died of the Spanish flu. Thereafter he married again. Until 1939 he lived in Svitavy, then he and his wife escaped to Boskovice. On 19 March 1942, he was deported from Brno to Theresienstadt concentration camp by transport Ac (his transport number was 121). According to Yad Vashem and holocaust.cz, on 27 April 1942, he was transferred to Izbica Ghetto by transport Aq (his transport number was 944). However, according to an interview with his daughter Louise, he was transported to Auschwitz concentration camp, on the same train with which she had arrived in Theresienstadt. He had a pneumonia and high fever at this time. Emil Freund did not survive the Shoah. Also his son, his daughter-in-law and his grandson of 4 years were killed by the Nazi regime. His daughter could survive. |
| | HERE LIVED; LOUISE HERMANOVÁ; NÉE FREUNDOVÁ; BORN 1916; DEPORTED 1942; TO THERESIENSTADT; AUSCHWITZ; AND BERGEN-BELSEN; SURVIVED | Náměstí Míru 97; 49°45′23″N 16°27′59″E | Louise Hermanová née Freundová was born on 8 May 1916 in Svitavy. Her father was Emil Freund. In 1918 or 1919, her mother came down with the Spanish flu and died. Her father owned a shop for menswear, he married again. In 1934 she began a training as a Montessori pedagogue in Prague. She worked in various Jewish families as a private teacher. In February 1942, she too was arrested and deported to Theresienstadt concentration camp, her brother Arnošt and her father were already there. However, her father was transferred to Izbica Ghetto on the day of her arrival, while she stayed in Theresienstadt. On 24 December 1943 she arrived in Auschwitz concentration camp, where her prisoner number 72708 was tattooed on her left arm. She came to block 6, the amusement block for SS men. Later-on she was transferred to the women's and children's block 30/31, where she looked after the children who were separated from their families. Louise was deported again, this time to Christianstadt, a subcamp of Gross-Rosen concentration camp, where she had to perform forced labor in ammunition and weapon manufacturing. At the beginning of 1945, the camp was evacuated, the prisoners had to move westwards on a death march. Louise tried to flee, but was caught again. After 800 km of walking in winter time, the destination, Bergen-Belsen concentration camp, was reached. Louise Hermanová suffered from typhus there. On 15 April 1945 the camp was handed over to the British, on 17 April a medical unit arrived. It took three months for Louise to recover. On 14 July 1945, she was released and went to Prague, still in prison clothes. Her father, her brother, her sister-in-law and her nephew were all murdered by the Nazi regime in the course of the Shoah. In autumn of 1946 she worked in a reception center for survivors, mainly Polish Jews, who wanted to leave for Palestine. There she met the physician Alexander Hermann, an Auschwitz survivor. They became a couple and married on 16 March 1947. They moved to Broumov, where her husband opened a practice. She supported her husband in his daily work. They became parents of two children, Jana and Otto. She volunteered for Holocaust survivors and was member of associations of former Jewish concentration camp prisoners. She also collaborated with the German National Center for Political Education, the Bergen-Belsen Memorial. On 2 February 2013 Louise Hermanová died in České Budějovice. |
| | HERE LIVED; DR. MED. ALBERT; MELLER; BORN 1890; DEPORTED 1943; TO THERESIENSTADT; MURDERED 1943; IN AUSCHWITZ | Náměstí Míru 13; 49°45′18″N 16°28′20″E | Albert Meller was born on 9 January 1890. He was a physician and married to Olga Mellerová, who was also a medical doctor. Before deportation he was living in Prague in Walderaushova 6. On 13 July 1943, he and his wife were deported from Prague to Theresienstadt concentration camp by transport Di (his transport number was 215). From there, on 6 September 1943, he and his spouse were transferred to Auschwitz by transport Dl (his transport number was 1377). There both Albert Meller and his wife were murdered. |
| | HERE LIVED; DR. MED. OLGA; MELLEROVÁ; BORN 1897; DEPORTED 1943; TO THERESIENSTADT; MURDERED 1943; IN AUSCHWITZ | Náměstí Míru 13; 49°45′18″N 16°28′20″E | Olga Mellerová was born on 13 May 1897. She was a pediatrician and married to Albert Meller, who was also a medical doctor. Before deportation she was living in Prague in Slezská 120. On 13 July 1943, she and her husband were deported from Prague to Theresienstadt concentration camp by transport Di (her transport number was 214). From there, on 6 September 1943, she and her husband were transferred to Auschwitz by transport Dl (her transport number was 1378). There both Olga Mellerová and her husband were murdered. |

== See also ==
- List of places with Stolpersteine
- Stolpersteine in the Czech Republic
