= Leon Felhendler =

Polish Jewish resistance fighter

- Leon Felhendler in 1944
- Born: 1 June 1910; Turobin, Congress Poland
- Died: 6 April 1945 (aged 34); Lublin, Poland
- Cause of death: Murdered
- Known for: One of the leaders of the revolt and escape from Sobibor

Leon Felhendler (Lejb Felhendler) (1 June 1910 – 6 April 1945) was a Polish resistance fighter known for his role in organizing the 1943 prisoner uprising at Sobibor extermination camp together with Alexander Pechersky.

== Prewar life ==
Felhendler was one of six children born to Rabbi Symcha Felhendler and Gitla Felhendler (née Fersztendik) in the village of Turobin. The family moved to Żółkiewka in 1911, where Symcha Felhendler became the town's official rabbi in January 1924. The Felhendlers were a prominent family, relatively well off by local standards, and their children married into a number of other locally prominent families.

In 1935, at the age of 25, Leon married Toba Wajnberg, the daughter of a grain trader who was also a recent transplant from Turobin to Żółkiewka. They had two children together; one was a son named Chaim Szymon, while nothing is known about the other. Little is known about Leon Felhendler's adult life due to the sparseness of documentation and the complete absence of records from Żółkiewka after 1936. Some indications suggest that he worked as a miller, perhaps going into business with his father-in-law. Tax records indicate that his personal income may have been relatively low, and he does not appear to have had an active role in local social or political organizations.

During the German occupation, Felhendler served as head of the Żółkiewka Judenrat, a position which required him to walk a fine line between meeting the needs of his community and obeying the demands of the German occupiers. Simultaneously, he managed the local chapter of the Jewish Self-Help Society. Conditions were extremely harsh in the town, which had not fully recovered from a devastating fire a few years prior and suffered from an epidemic of typhus in late 1941. The few surviving records of his tenure in this position include letters to the offices in Kraków and Krasnystaw appealing for help setting up a soup kitchen. Once Operation Reinhard began, Felhendler used his position to protect his family from deportation. However, on 16 October 1942, the entire remaining Jewish population of Żółkiewka was deported to the nearby Izbica Ghetto, including Felhendler himself.

Shortly after their arrival in Izbica, Felhendler's parents and one of his sisters were selected for deportation but were shot on the railway platform. Felhendler and several of his surviving relatives eluded deportation for several weeks using a hiding place they had prepared in advance. However, they were discovered on 2 November 1942 and sent to Sobibor via Trawniki on a horse-drawn cart.

== Sobibor ==
Upon his arrival at Sobibor, Felhendler was selected for labour due to the intervention of a cousin who told the Germans that he was a skilled carpenter. The rest of his family was sent to the gas chambers. Felhendler worked in the sorting barracks, where prisoners sorted through the luggage of the gas chamber victims. On his second day in the camp, he came across his relatives' belongings, including his brother-in-law's wedding ring, which he salvaged and took with him when he eventually escaped from the camp.

In the spring of 1943, Felhendler led a small group of Sobibor prisoners in formulating an escape plan. Their initial idea had been to poison camp guards and seize their weapons, but the SS discovered the poison and shot five Jews in retaliation. Other plans included setting the camp on fire and escaping in the resulting confusion, but the mining of the camp perimeter by the SS in the summer of 1943 rendered the plan impractical.

In late September 1943, a Holocaust transport of Jews from the Minsk Ghetto arrived. Among them was a Soviet POW officer of the Red Army, Alexander Pechersky, who survived the selection to gas chambers. His presence gave new impetus to the escape plans. Pechersky soon assumed the leadership of the group of would-be escapees and, with Felhendler as his deputy, devised a plan that involved killing the camp's SS personnel, sending the remaining Soviet POWs to raid the arsenal and then fighting their way out the camp's front gate.

The uprising, which took place on 14 October 1943, was detected in its early stages after a guard discovered the body of an SS officer killed by the prisoners. Nevertheless, about 320 Jews managed to make it outside of the camp in the ensuing melee. Eighty were killed in the escape and immediate aftermath. 170 were soon recaptured and killed, as were all the remaining inhabitants of the camp who had chosen to stay. Some escapees joined the partisans. Of these, 90 died in combat. 62 Jews from Sobibor survived the war, including nine who had escaped earlier.

== Death in Lublin ==
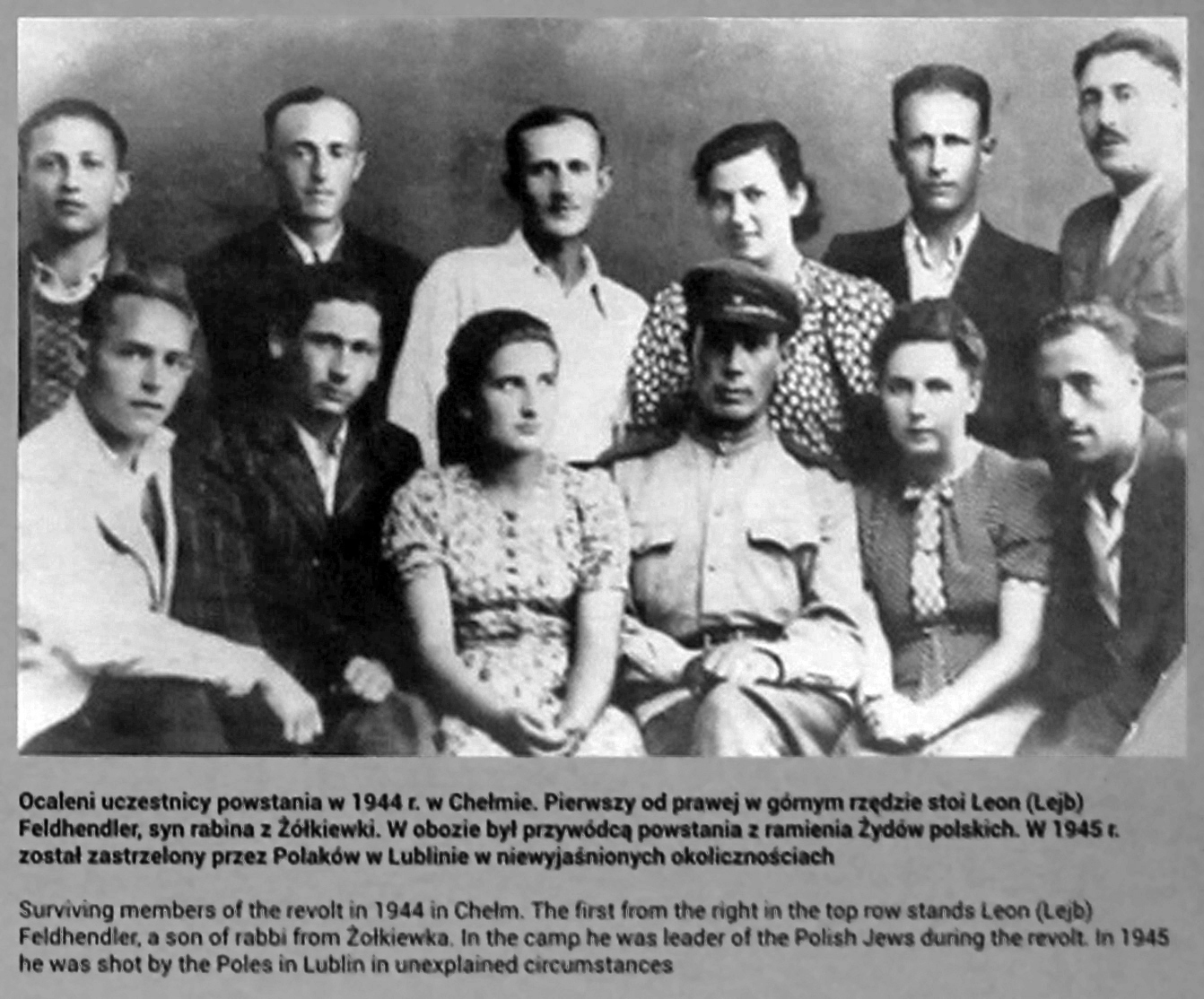
Some of the Sobibor extermination camp survivors in 1944 Felhendler is at the top right.

Felhendler was among those who survived the war, hiding in Lublin until the end of the German occupation. The city was taken by the Soviet Red Army on 24 July 1944 and became the temporary headquarters of the Soviet-controlled communist Polish Committee of National Liberation established by Joseph Stalin. However, on 2 April 1945, Felhendler was shot through the closed door of his flat as he got up to investigate a commotion in an outer room. Felhendler and his wife managed to escape through another door and made their way to Lublin's Św. Wincentego á Paulo hospital, where he underwent surgery, but died four days later. According to most of the older publications, Felhendler was killed by right-wing Polish nationalists, sometimes identified as the Narodowe Siły Zbrojne, an anti-Communist and anti-Semitic partisan unit. However, more recent inquiries, citing the incomplete treatment of the event by earlier historians, and the scant documentary record, have called into question this version of events.

The only concrete document found by local Polish scholars is a record of Felhendler's hospital admission at Wincentego á Paulo describing the injury. Dr Kopciowski wrote that Feldhendler was likely shot in an armed robbery gone bad because he was known locally as a budding gold trader. Meanwhile, as noted by Marcin Wroński, the communist press in the Soviet-controlled Lublin routinely accused former AK and WIN partisans of common crime as part of ideological warfare. Felhendler's killing was one of at least 118 violent deaths of Jews in the Lublin district between the summer of 1944 and the autumn of 1946.

== Honours and awards ==
- Commander's Cross of the Order of Polonia Restituta - awarded posthumously by President of Poland Andrzej Duda on 14 October 2018 during the commemorations of the 75th anniversary of the uprising in Sobibor extermination camp.
- Order of Courage of the Russian Federation – awarded posthumously by President of Russia Vladimir Putin on 17 July 2019. The award was presented by Putin to Leon Felhendler's great-niece, Nitza Shahham, during the opening ceremony of the Candle of Remembrance memorial to the victims of the Leningrad siege on 23 January 2020 at Jerusalem.

== Felhendler in culture ==
In the 1987 made-for-TV film Escape from Sobibor he was played by Alan Arkin. Felhendler's life in Lublin is mentioned in the 2005 book Wyjątkowo długa linia by Hanna Krall. It was written about tenants of a local tenement house, and nominated for the Nike Award.
