= Hela Felenbaum-Weiss =

Survivor of the Sobibor camp uprising

Hela Felenbaum-Weiss (2 January 1924 – December 1988) was one of the few survivors of the Sobibor extermination camp and a decorated partisan fighter in the Soviet Red Army.

== Early and family life ==
Felenbaum-Weiss was born on 2 January 1924, in Lublin to a Jewish family of five. Before the outbreak of World War II, her family was middle-class. Her parents worked and she and her siblings were educated in schools in Lublin.

Her father, Mojsze Felenbaum, b. 1882 in Lublin, her mother, Henryka "Henia" Felenbaum née Flantzman, b. 1894 in Lublin, died together in November 1942 in the gas chambers of the Sobibor extermination camp.

Her brother Syzmon "Shimek" Felenbaum, b. 1921 in Lublin, attempted to escape in a prisoner transfer to Sobibor and was shot by Nazi SS officers. Her other brother Henryk "Heniek" Felenbaum, b. 1928 in Lublin, was murdered in the gas chambers of Sobibor in December 1942.

== World War II ==
=== Siedliszcze and Staw Labor Camps ===
World War II broke out when Felenbaum-Weiss was 15 years old. Initially, she attended school, but soon her family, like other Jewish residents of Lublin, fell victim to persecution. Her parents could not continue working, and her family fell into financial hardships. In 1940, the family was forcibly resettled to Rejowiec, from where they were directed on foot (about 15 kilometers) to the town, and labor camp, of Siedliszcze.

In the labor camp in Siedliszcze, Felenbaum-Weiss fell ill with typhus, but recovered thanks to a camp doctor. The whole family worked physically digging ditches and building a drainage system.

After a year of forced labor in Siedliszcze, in 1942 her parents (Mojsze and Henryka) did not pass "selection" and were declared unfit for work due to illnesses. In November 1942, both were sent to the labor camp in Krychów then were killed in the gas chamber in Sobibor.

Felenbaum-Weiss and her brothers were sent to the town and labor camp in Staw, Poland, where they worked in a mill. Here she met Zelda Kelberman Metz, Ester Raab Terner, and Regina Zielinski Feldman who all survived and escaped from the death camp in Sobibor.

After the liquidation of the Staw camp in December 1942, Felenbaum-Weiss and her brothers were sent to Włodawa, and then to Sobibor. Her older brother Szymon tried to escape during the prisoner transport, during which he was shot by the SS men.

=== Stay and escape from Sobibor ===
Felenbaum-Weiss was sent to the Sobibor extermination camp on 20 December 1942, by horse-drawn cart. As an extermination camp rather than a concentration camp, Sobibor existed for the sole purpose of murdering Jews. The vast majority of prisoners were gassed within hours of arrival. Those not killed immediately were forced to assist in the operation of the camp, and few survived more than a few months. In total, some 170,000 to 250,000 people were murdered at Sobibor, making it the fourth-deadliest Nazi camp after Auschwitz, Treblinka, and Belzec.

By chance, Felenbaum-Weiss managed to avoid death in the gas chamber. She recalled the event as follows:

As in a dream, I heard the voice of one of the Germans. He asked, "Does anyone know how to knit?" I stepped out of line. […] then they took me to the barracks, where I met two girls I knew: Zelda Metz and Estera Terner. When I was a child, my mother taught me how to knit socks. My job was to knit them for the Germans and iron shirts for the men of the SS.

In contrast, her brother Henryk was sent to death in the gas chambers at Sobibor upon arrival. In the months that followed, she was directed to work in the laundry and in the garden for the SS men. From this place, she watched the trains bringing prisoners to Sobibór. She described her stay in the camp as follows:

There is nothing more terrifying than feeling helpless in the face of horrific crimes that are taking place before your eyes, but you can't do anything about it. What could we girls do when we saw people being led to their deaths? Nothing.

On 14 October 1943, there was a Prisoner revolt which led to the closing of Sobibor. During the uprising, she escaped with Zelda Kelberman Metz, Ester Raab Terner and Abraham Margulies. They managed to hide in the forest, in a forester's hut, where they found a supply of potatoes in sacks, but hunger and cold forced them to keep moving.

It is estimated that 58 people, including Felenbaum-Weiss and nine other women, survived Sobibor.

=== Partisan activities ===
While hiding in the nearby forests, Felenbaum-Weiss and the group she escaped with met Soviet prisoners of war who had escaped from a labor camp and helped provide food they hunted in the forest. After some time in the forest looking for a group of partisans to join, they found and joined the partisan brigade called The Prokupyuk Brigade. She was wounded several times in combat.

She was motivated to take up the fight by notes found in the pockets of the victims shot in Sobibór, which she described in the following words:

One day, a transport from the Belzec extermination camp arrived in Sobibór. [...] a moment later we heard numerous salvos and we knew – these were not target shooting exercises. Later we understood the truth: we found notes in Yiddish in the pockets of the clothes on the corpse. They wrote: “They told us we were going to a labor camp, but that was a lie. Avenge our death!" Later, when I joined the partisans and passed through Poland, Germany and Czechoslovakia, I often thought about these notes. They became a source of inspiration and encouragement for me.

For her partisan activities, she received a total of six medals and decorations, including the Medal for Courage and the Order of the Red Star. She received five medals for combat:

1. On 1 October 1944, for her participation in the combat in the Carpathian Mountains,
2. On 26 November 1944, for her participation in the combat on Michalovce and Humenné,
3. On 20 January 1945, for participating in the combat for conquering the cities of Prešov and Košice,
4. For the conquering of Moravská Ostrava and;
5. On 8 May 1945 – the day of signing the cease fire treaty and for my participating in the last combats of World War II.

== Life after World War II ==
In Czechoslovakia she met and married a Jewish Czech soldier fighting in 1st Czechoslovak Army Corps in the Soviet Union in General Svoboda's army. The wedding took place in Czechoslovakia.

She then emigrated to Israel with her husband, where she ran a restaurant and gave birth to three children. She lived in Israel until the end of her life. She died in Gedera in December 1988.

=== Testimonies ===
Felenbaum-Weiss provided in-depth testimony of her experience during World War II.

She testified about the crimes committed by Gustav Wagner, including the killing of a sick man who was unable to attend an assembly. She described Gustav Wagner as a "dangerous sadist." An example of Wagner's cruelty, in Felenbaum-Weiss's words:

On days that no transports arrived, he would take people from the camp and shoot them himself.

Once she witnessed Wagner killing a sick young man, who had not been able to attend roll call:

Wagner entered the barracks, called the boy out and shot him in front of all the prisoners.

Felenbaum-Weiss also testified against Karl Frenzel, Wagner's deputy. She testified to an example of his cruelty:

One day a special transport arrived at the camp. The people were not wearing regular clothes. Those prisoners wore striped pajamas. They were so skinny and bony, and collapsing from hunger induced weakness. Their heads were shaved and you could not tell the difference between men and women. A rumor was spread in the camp that those people, about 300 hundred of them, arrived from the Majdanek death camp, where the gas chambers ceased to operate. The Germans ordered them to lay down on the ground, and they simply collapsed. Frenzel, an S.S. man, came over and poured a chlorine solution on their heads, as if they were already corpses. The screaming and groaning that came out of their throats were like wounded animal’s howls. It seems that there are no limits to human cruelty.

Her testimony was published in a book by Miriam Novitch, published under the title Sobibor - Camp of Death and Revolt in 1979 in Tel Aviv.

Felenbaum-Weiss's story was also covered by Richard Rashke in Escape from Sobibor and by Chris Webb in Sobibor Death Camp: History, Biographies, Remembrance.
