= Szcześniki =

- Village
- Location within Poland
- Coordinates: 51°26′30″N 23°23′06″E
- Country: Poland
- Voivodeship: Lublin
- County: Włodawa
- Gmina: Hańsk

Szcześniki [ʂt͡ʂɛɕˈniki] is a village in the administrative district of Gmina Hańsk, within Włodawa County, Lublin Voivodeship, in eastern Poland.
