= Bukowski Las =

- Village
- Location within Poland
- Coordinates: 51°22′N 23°27′E
- Country: Poland
- Voivodeship: Lublin
- County: Włodawa
- Gmina: Hańsk

Bukowski Las (Polish pronunciation: [buˈkɔfskʲi ˈlas]) is a village in the administrative district of Gmina Hańsk, within Włodawa County, Lublin Voivodeship, in eastern Poland.
