= Izbica =

- Town
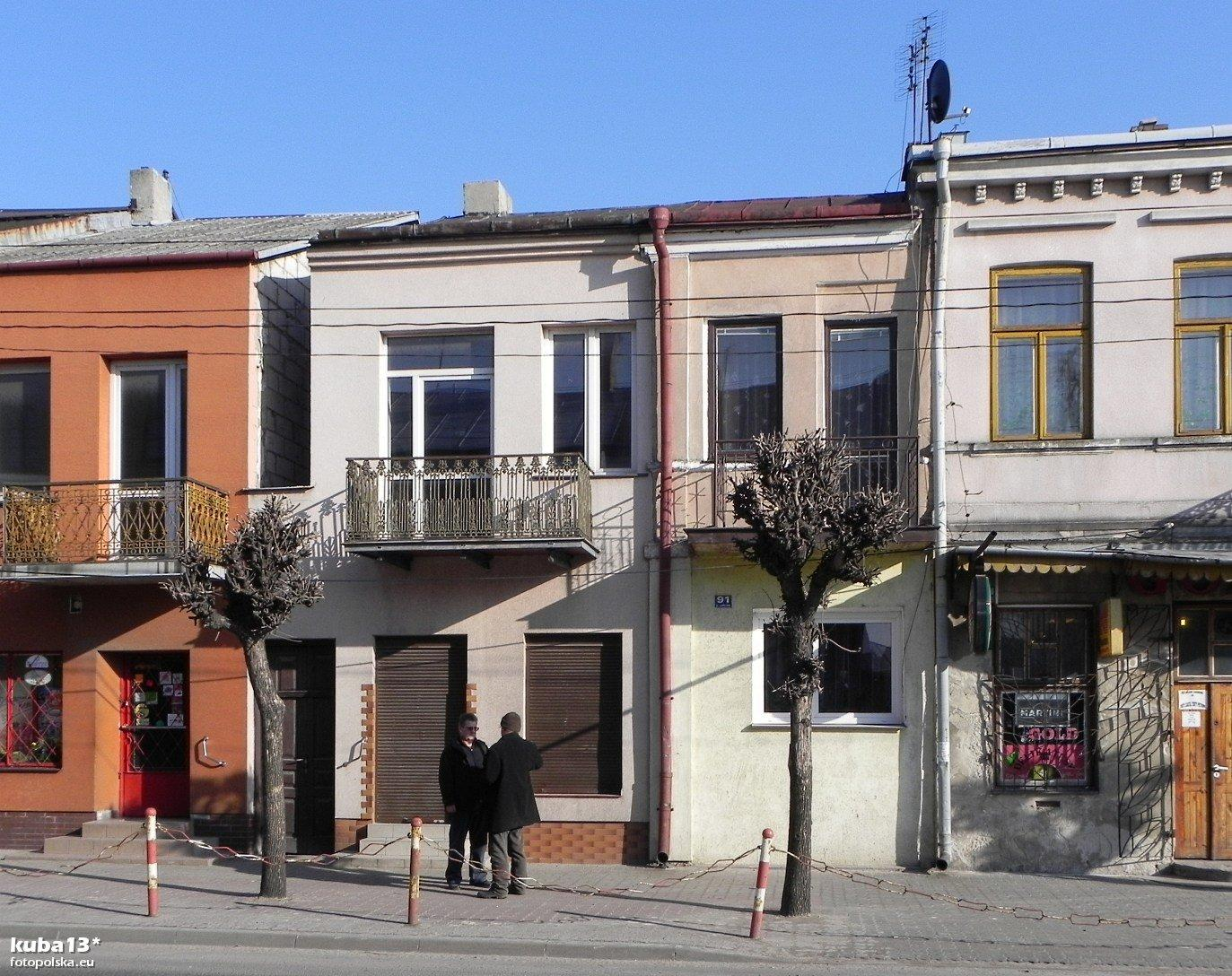
- Row tenements in Izbica

- Coat of arms

- Location within Poland
- Coordinates: 50°53′N 23°10′E
- Country: Poland
- Voivodeship: Lublin
- County: Krasnystaw
- Gmina: Izbica
- First mentioned: 1419
- Town rights: 1750

Population
  - Total: 1,933
- Time zone: UTC+1 (CET)
  - Summer (DST): UTC+2 (CEST)
- Vehicle registration: LKS
- Website: www.izbica.ug.mbnet.pl

Izbica (pronounced ['izˈbit͡sa]) (Note: Yiddish: איזשביצע Izhbitz, Izhbitze) is a town in the Krasnystaw County of the Lublin Voivodeship in eastern Poland. It is the seat of the gmina administrative district called Gmina Izbica. It has a population of 1,933.

== History ==
First mentioned in a church document from 1419, Izbica became a town in 1750, granted location privileges by King Augustus III of Poland including the right of a Jewish settlement. Previously, the unconcluded town rights were issued in 1540 to Hetman Jan Tarnowski, who gave them back to the crown. In 1662 some 23 Catholics lived there. In 1744 the Jews of Tarnogóra were brought to Izbica by Antoni Granowski who secured the town privileges for them independently of the preexisting old settlement.

A notable centre of trade and commerce, with time the town became a shtetl inhabited almost entirely by Polish Jews. In 1760 the town charter was reaffirmed. After the First Partition of Poland in 1772 Izbica was annexed by Austria and then purchased back from the Austrian government by Ignacy Horodyski in 1808. After the Polish victory in the Austro-Polish War of 1809, it was regained by Poles and included within the short-lived Polish Duchy of Warsaw, and after the duchy's dissolution in 1815, the town became part of the Russian-controlled Congress Poland. The town was consumed by fire in 1825. In 1827 it had 51 houses and 407 inhabitants, all of them Jewish. By 1860 the population tripled to 1,450 Jews. In the 19th century the town was a notable centre of Hasidic Judaism, particularly thanks to the tzadik Grand Rabbi Mordechai Yosef Leiner, who was a disciple of Mendel of Kotsk, and his son Grand Rabbi Yaacov Leiner who established the Hasidic dynasty of Ishbitz. The Grand Rabbi Yaakov Leiner was the author of Beit Ya'akov and father of the Tzadik Gershon Chanokh Leiner of Radzyn. After the January Uprising of 1863 against the Russian Empire, in which many of the local inhabitants took part, the town was stripped of its city rights in 1869 for punishment, and attached to the nearby commune of Tarnogóra.

Following Poland's return to independence in the aftermath of World War I, the town grew significantly. Streets were paved and the marketplace rebuilt. According to 1921 census, Izbica had 3,085 inhabitants including 2,862 Jews, but by 1939, the total number grew to roughly 6,000 with 5,098 Jews. Izbica expanded particularly well because of the paved Lublin-Zamość thoroughfare, and a railway line to Zamość inaugurated in 1917.

=== World War II ===
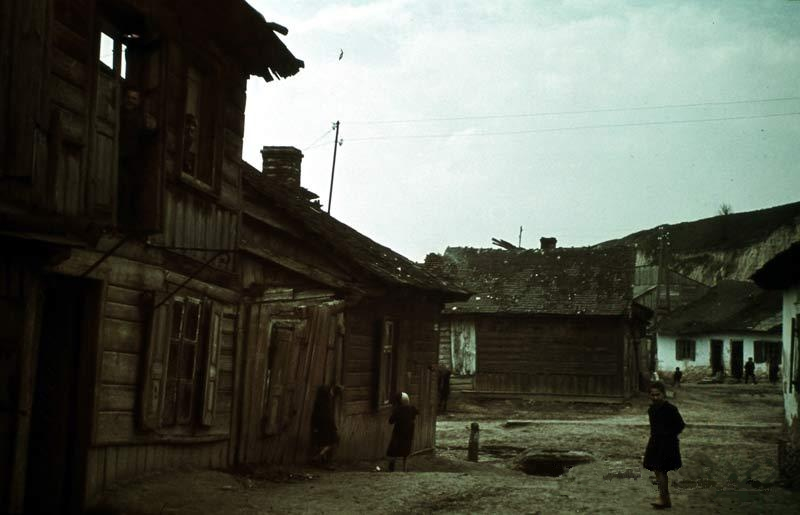
Izbica Ghetto

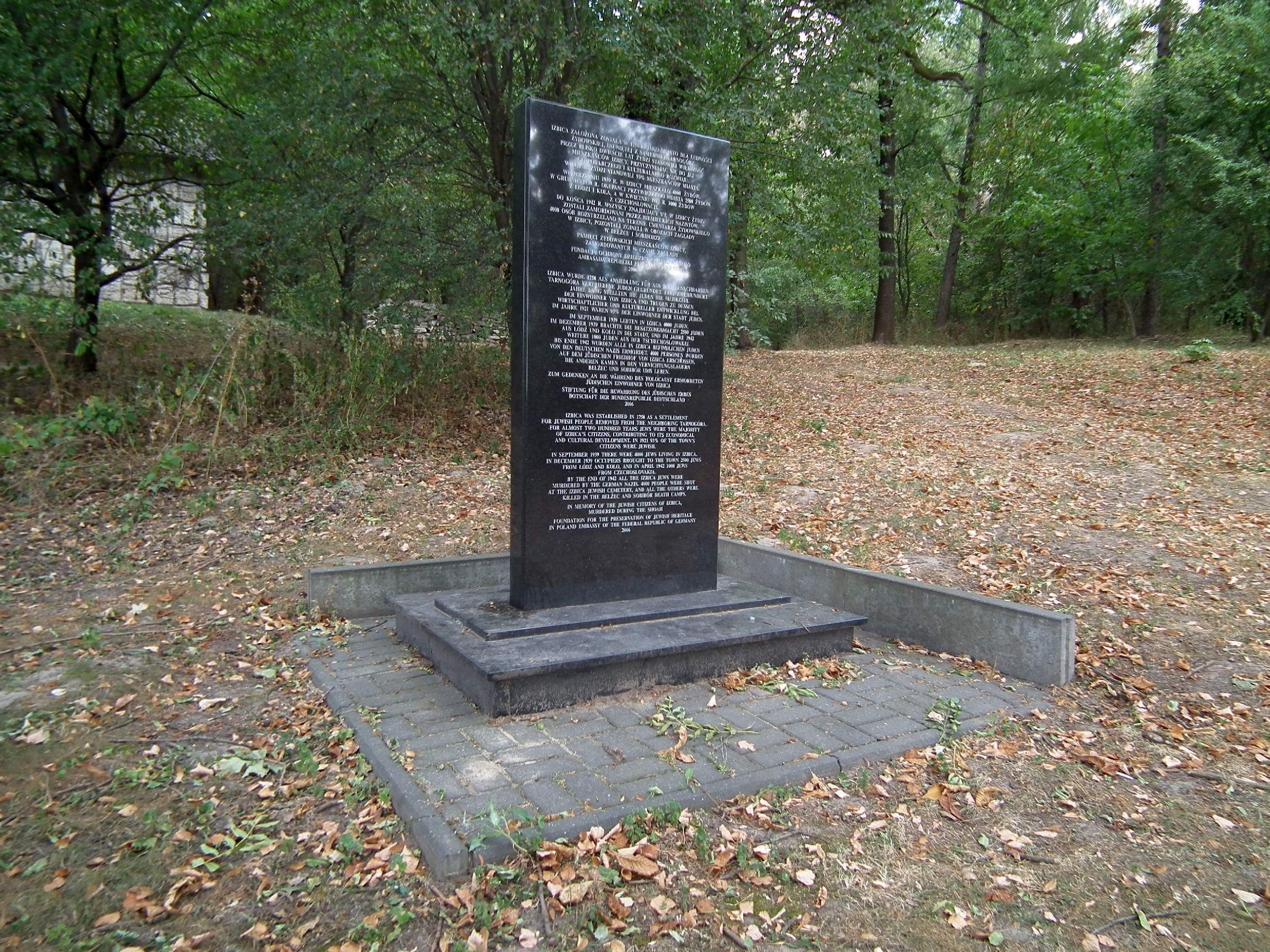
Memorial to local Jews

Following the German and Soviet invasion of Poland in 1939 during the opening stages of World War II the town was overrun by the Germans. A number of prominent Polish Christians were arrested and murdered in the course of the AB Action against Polish intelligentsia. Jews were brutalized and robbed from the beginning of the occupation. The Germans resettled thousands of other Jews in Izbica beginning at the end of 1939. These included deportees from Biała Podlaska, Komarówka, Wohyń, and Czemierniki arrived. Almost the entire town was a ghetto. The Polish resistance established a secret organization to aid and rescue Jews in Izbica. The local Polish police chief and further two policemen were murdered by the Russians in the Katyn massacre in 1940.

In the spring of 1941 in preparation for the attack on the Soviet lines in eastern Poland the German military storage facilities were set up in Izbica, and kept under heavy guard. The first mass deportation of ghetto inmates to the Bełżec extermination camp took place in mid-March 1942 conducted by the Reserve Police Battalion 101 with the aid of Ukrainian Trawnikis. During Operation Reinhard the ghetto served as a transfer point to the extermination camps in Bełżec and Sobibór for foreign Jews deported from Germany, Austria, Czechoslovakia and western Poland (Reichsgau Wartheland). In rounding them up in Izbica, typically the guards murdered dozens or hundreds in the town. Following the departures, Jews were hunted down and murdered in hiding places or in nearby fields. More than 20,000 Jews passed through the Izbica ghetto. Of all Jews of Izbica (over 90% of its prewar population), only 14 survived the Holocaust.

== Points of interest ==
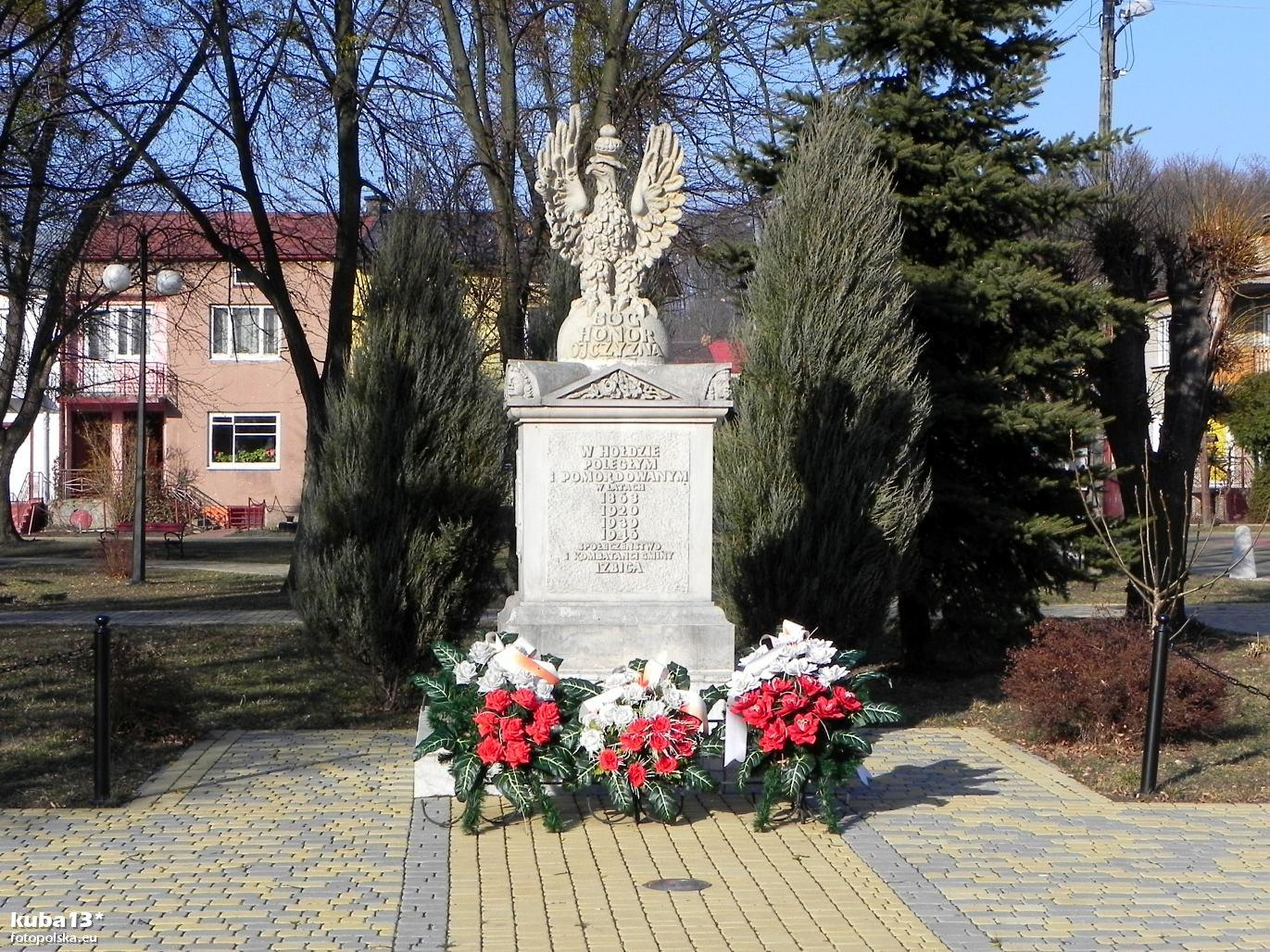
Monument to Poles fallen and killed in fight for Polish independence

- Skierbieszów Landscape Park, protected area established in 1995
- Działy Grabowieckie, forested geological formation featuring deep ravines and valleys
- Jewish cemetery (kirkut) in Izbica
- Monument to Poles fallen and killed in fight for Polish independence in 1863, 1920, 1939 and 1946
- Historic water tower from 1911

== International relations ==
=== Twin towns – Sister cities ===
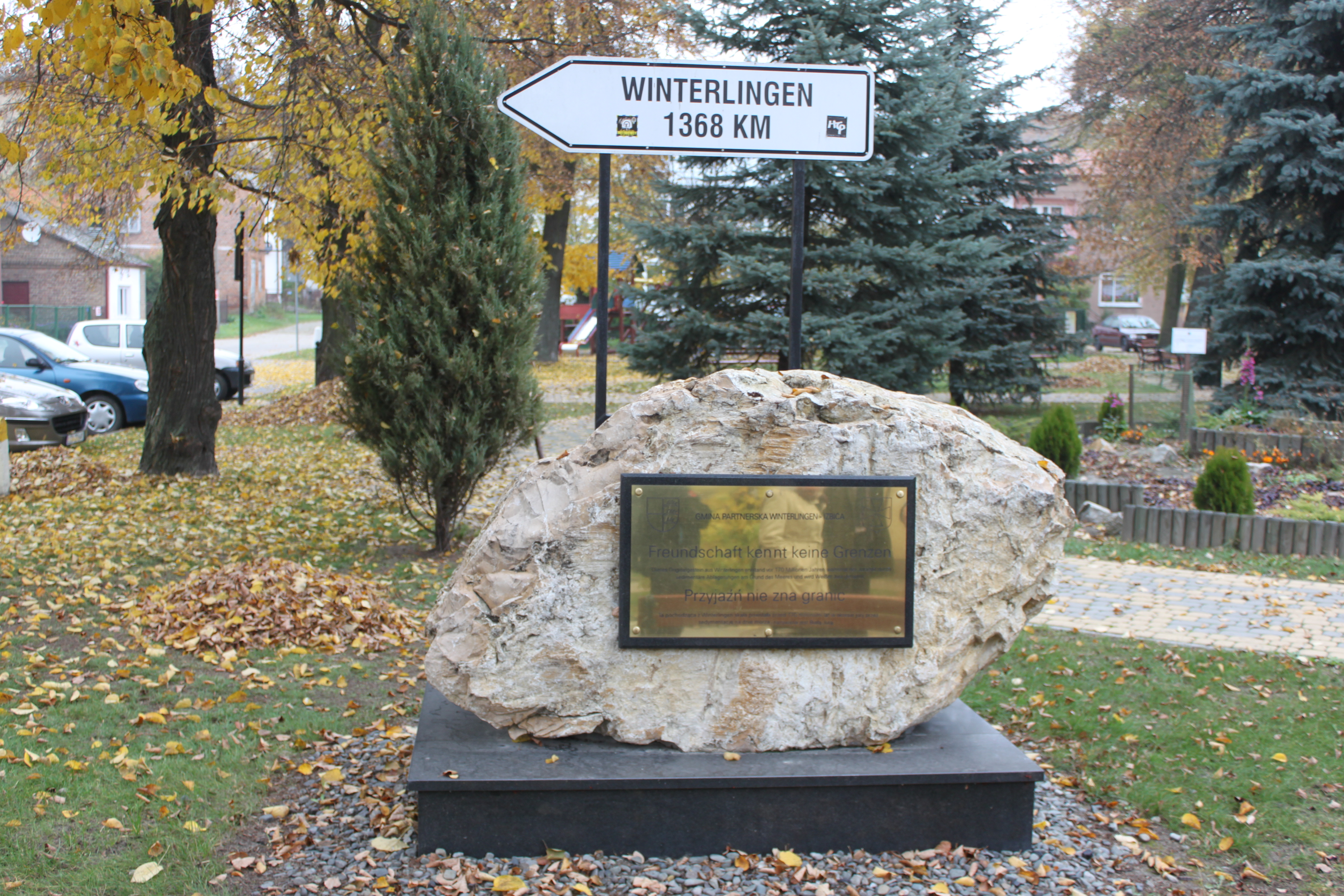
Stone commemorating the town twinning of Izbica and Winterlingen

Izbica is twinned with:

- Winterlingen, Germany

== See also ==
- Thomas Blatt, a Polish-American writer born to a Jewish family in Izbica in 1927
- Izhbitza – Radzin (Hasidic dynasty) formed in 1839
- Jan Karski, smuggled to town in 1942 in order to report on the Holocaust ghetto in Izbica
- Avrom Greenbaum, a Polish-Scottish playwright and theatre director born in Izbica in 1903
