= Richard Rashke =

American journalist and author (born 1936)

Richard L. Rashke (born 1936) is an American journalist, teacher and author, who has written non-fiction books, as well as plays and screenplays. He is especially known for his history, Escape from Sobibor, first published in 1982, an account of the mass escape in October 1943 of hundreds of Jewish prisoners from the extermination camp at Sobibor in German-occupied Poland. The book was adapted as a 1987 TV movie by the same name.

== Early life and education ==
Richard Rashke was born in Milwaukee, Wisconsin, to Guy and Angeline (Luksich) Rashke. He had an older brother Donald. Richard attended local schools and has a master's degree in journalism from American University.

== Literary career ==
After working as a journalist, Rashke started pursuing his own topics. His first book, The deacon in search of identity, was about a deacon in the Roman Catholic Church, published by Paulist Press in 1975.

He followed the widespread publicity about Karen Silkwood, her death, and the suit which her family brought against her former employer, Kerr-McGee. Her life and activism, and suspicious death, became the subject of his book, The Killing of Karen Silkwood: The Story Behind the Kerr-McGee Plutonium Case, published by Houghton-Mifflin in 1981.

Becoming interested in the story of resistance showed by hundreds of Jews who escaped from Sobibor, a German Nazi extermination camp in Poland, Rashke did research and interviewed survivors for his 1982 book, Escape from Sobibor. It was adapted as a 1987 TV movie by the same name, starring actors Alan Arkin and Rutger Hauer.

One of the survivors of Sobibor whom Rashke interviewed was Esther Terner Raab. As a result of her talks about her experience, she received many letters, which she shared with Rashke, as she said they helped her heal. His play about her and the influence of the letters, Dear Esther, premiered in 1998 in Washington, DC, at the U.S. Holocaust Memorial Museum.

Drawn to compelling personal stories, Rashke has studied subjects including Bill Lear, an aviation engineer and inventor who did not get beyond seventh grade.

== Marriage and family ==
Rashke is married to Paula Kaufmann. They live in Beaver Dam, Wisconsin.

== Bibliography ==
=== Books ===
- The deacon in search of identity. Paulist Press. 1975. ISBN 978-0-8091-1851-9.
- The Killing of Karen Silkwood: The Story Behind the Kerr-McGee Plutonium Case (2nd ed.). Houghton-Mifflin. 2000 [First published 1981]. ISBN 978-0-8014-8667-8 – via Ithaca, NY: Cornell University Press.
- Escape from Sobibor: Revised and Updated Edition. Harrison, NY: Delphinium Books, Inc. 2013 [First published 1982]. ISBN 978-1-4804-5851-2 – via New York: Open Road Integrated Media, Inc.
- Stormy Genius: The Rags to Riches Life of Bill Lear (with Pat Lear) (3rd ed.). Houghton Mifflin. 2014 [First published 1985]. ISBN 978-1-4992-1785-8 – via CreateSpace Independent Publishing Platform.
- Parker, Robert (1986). Capitol Hill in Black and White. New York: Dodd, Mead & Co. ISBN 978-0-396-08670-3. – co-author
- Runaway Father: The True Story of Pat Bennett, Her Daughters and Their Seventeen-Year Search. Harcourt Brace Jovanovich. 1988. ISBN 978-0-15-179040-1.
- Trust Me. Laytonsville, MD: Narco, LLC. 2001. ISBN 978-0-9706825-0-5 – via Kearney, NE: Morris Publishing.
- Useful Enemies: America's Open-Door Policy for Nazi War Criminals. New York: Delphinium Books. 2013. ISBN 978-1-883285-51-7 – via Open Road Integrated Media.
- The Whistleblower's Dilemma: Snowden, Silkwood And Their Quest For the Truth. Delphinium Books, Inc. 2015. ISBN 978-1-883285-68-5.
- Children's Letters to a Holocaust Survivor: Dear Esther (with Esther Terner Raab) (1st ed.). Historic Heroines. 2016. ISBN 978-0-9972885-0-6. In October 1943, Esther Terner and 300 other Jews escaped from Sobibor, a Nazi death camp in eastern Poland. It was the biggest escape of WWII and the subject of Escape from Sobibor. That book, and the movie based on it, brought Esther many invitations to speak in public schools. Her courageous story generated hundreds of letters from children expressing their love, concern and outrage. Those letters became the inspiration for the play, Dear Esther. This is a collection of the heartfelt letters, poems and drawings school children sent Esther, along with the play.

=== Plays ===
- Asking For It (out of print)
- Bang! (out of print)
- Dear Esther (1st ed.). Dear Esther Productions. 2000. ISBN 978-0-9678679-0-8.
- Love in a Petri Dish (out of print)
- Pius (out of print)
- Season to Season (out of print)
