= Dubeczno =

- Settlement
- Location within Poland
- Coordinates: 51°25′N 23°26′E
- Country: Poland
- Voivodeship: Lublin
- County: Włodawa
- Gmina: Hańsk
- Elevation: 160 m (520 ft)
- Time zone: UTC+1 (CET)
  - Summer (DST): UTC+2 (CEST)
- Website: http://www.dubeczno.cba.pl

Dubeczno [duˈbɛt͡ʂnɔ] is a settlement in the administrative district of Gmina Hańsk, within Włodawa County, Lublin Voivodeship, in eastern Poland.

== History ==
Six Polish citizens were murdered by Nazi Germany in the village during World War II.
