= Konstantynówka, Lublin Voivodeship =

Konstantynówka
- Village
- Location within Poland
- Coordinates: 51°23′N 23°25′E
- Country: Poland
- Voivodeship: Lublin
- County: Włodawa
- Gmina: Hańsk

Konstantynówka [kɔnstantɨˈnufka] is a village in the administrative district of Gmina Hańsk, within Włodawa County, Lublin Voivodeship, in eastern Poland.
