= Wojciechów, Włodawa County =

Wojciechów
- Village
- Location within Poland
- Coordinates: 51°21′23″N 23°20′56″E
- Country: Poland
- Voivodeship: Lublin
- County: Włodawa
- Gmina: Hańsk

Wojciechów (Polish pronunciation: [vɔjˈt͡ɕɛxuf]) is a village in the administrative district of Gmina Hańsk, within Włodawa County, Lublin Voivodeship, in eastern Poland.
