= Stary Majdan, Włodawa County =

Stary Majdan
- Village
- Location within Poland
- Coordinates: 51°21′42″N 23°23′57″E
- Country: Poland
- Voivodeship: Lublin
- County: Włodawa
- Gmina: Hańsk

Stary Majdan (Polish pronunciation: [ˈstarɨ ˈmajdan]) is a village in the administrative district of Gmina Hańsk, within Włodawa County, Lublin Voivodeship, in eastern Poland.
