= Escape from Sobibor =

1987 television film directed by Jack Gold

- Genre: Drama; History; War
- Teleplay by: Reginald Rose
- Story by: Thomas Blatt; Richard Rashke; Stanisław Szmajzner
- Directed by: Jack Gold
- Starring: Alan Arkin; Joanna Pacuła; Rutger Hauer; Hartmut Becker; Jack Shepherd; Simon Gregor
- Narrated by: Howard K. Smith
- Music by: Georges Delerue
- Countries of origin: United Kingdom; Yugoslavia
- Original language: English

Production
- Executive producer: Martin Starger
- Producers: Dennis E. Doty; Howard P. Alston
- Cinematography: Ernest Vincze
- Editor: Keith Palmer
- Running time: 176 minutes (UK/ITV; 169 minutes with PAL speed-up); 143 minutes (US/CBS); 120 minutes (edited)
- Production companies: Zenith Entertainment; Rule Starger (for Central)

Original release
- Network: ITV
- Release: 10 May 1987

Escape from Sobibor is a 1987 British television film which aired on ITV and CBS. It is the story of the mass escape from the Nazi extermination camp at Sobibor, the most successful uprising by Jewish prisoners of German extermination camps (uprisings also took place at Auschwitz-Birkenau and Treblinka). The film was directed by Jack Gold and shot in Avala, Yugoslavia (now Serbia). The full 176-minute version shown in the UK (Note: Running to 169 minutes with PAL speed-up.) on 10 May 1987 followed a 143-minute version shown in the United States on 12 April 1987.

The script, by Reginald Rose, was based on Richard Rashke's 1983 book of the same name, along with a manuscript by Sobibor survivor Thomas Blatt, "From the Ashes of Sobibor", and a book by Stanisław Szmajzner, Inferno in Sobibor, also a survivor. Alan Arkin, Joanna Pacuła, and Rutger Hauer starred in the film. The film received a Golden Globe Award for Best Miniseries or Television Film and Hauer received a Golden Globe Award for Best Actor in a Supporting Role—Television Film or Miniseries. (The film tied with Poor Little Rich Girl: The Barbara Hutton Story.) Esther Raab was a camp survivor who had assisted Rashke with his book and served as a technical consultant.

== Background ==
On 14 October 1943, members of the Sobibor camp's underground resistance killed 11 German SS-Totenkopfverbände officers and a number of Sonderdienst Ukrainian and Volksdeutsche guards. Of the 600 inmates in the camp, roughly 300 escaped, although all but 50–70 were later re-captured and killed. After the escape, the SS Chief, Heinrich Himmler, ordered the death camp closed. It was dismantled, bulldozed under the earth and planted over with trees to cover it up.

== Plot ==
When a new trainload of Polish Jews arrives for processing at Sobibor, the German Commandant assures them the place is a work camp. SS officers select a small number of prisoners with trade skills (such as goldsmiths, seamstresses, shoemakers, and tailors) and the remainder are sent to a different part of the camp from which a pillar of smoke rises day and night. The prisoners come to realise Sobibor is a death camp where Jews are exterminated in gas chambers, and cremated in large ovens. The skilled prisoners who are spared must sort the belongings of the murder victims and then repair the shoes, recycle the clothing, and melt down any precious metals to make jewellery for the SS. The existence of the surviving prisoners is precarious and they are subject to random beatings and murders. When two prisoners escape from a work detail, the most sadistic of the SS officers, Gustav Wagner, gives the remaining thirteen prisoners the choice of either selecting another prisoner to die with them, or refusing in which case he will kill fifty prisoners. The prisoners comply and he executes all twenty six.

The leader of the prisoners, Leon Feldhendler, realises that when the trains eventually stop coming, the camp will have outlived its usefulness, and all the remaining Jews will be murdered. He devises a plan for every prisoner to escape, by luring the SS officers and NCOs into the prisoners' barracks and work huts one by one and killing them as quietly as possible. Once all the Germans are dead, the prisoners will assemble into columns and simply march out of the camp as if they have been ordered to, hoping the Ukrainian guards will remain oblivious with no Germans to give orders or raise the alarm. A new group of Red Army prisoners who are Russian Jews arrives, and their leader, Sasha Pechersky and his men willingly join the revolt, their military skills proving invaluable.

The camp commandant departs for several days with Wagner, ensuring the most sadistic SS officers will be absent. On 14 October 1943 SS officers and NCOs are lured one by one into traps and killed with knives and clubs. Eleven Germans are killed, but one officer, Karl Frenzel discovers the corpse of one of his colleagues and raises the alarm. The prisoners have already assembled on the parade ground and, realising the plan has been discovered, Pechersky and Feldhendler urge the prisoners to revolt and flee the camp. Most of the 600 prisoners run for the perimeter fences, some of the Jews using captured rifles to shoot their way through the Ukrainian guards. Machine gun fire from the observation towers kill many of the fleeing prisoners, and other escapees are killed in the minefield surrounding the camp. Over 300 Jews reach the forest and escape into the forest.

Newscaster Howard K. Smith narrates the fates that befell some of the survivors on whose accounts the film was based. Of the 300 prisoners who escaped, only approximately 50 survived to see the end of the war in 1945. Pechersky made it back to Soviet lines and rejoined the Red Army and survived the war while Feldhendler was killed shortly after the war by antisemitic Poles. Sergeant Wagner escaped to Brazil, where he was stabbed to death in 1980. After the uprising, the largest escape from a prison camp of any kind in Europe during World War II, Sobibor was bulldozed to the ground, and trees were planted on the site to remove any sign of its existence.

== Cast ==
In credits order:

- Alan Arkin as Leon Feldhendler
- Joanna Pacuła as Luka (Gertrude Poppert-Schonborn)
- Rutger Hauer as Lieutenant Aleksander 'Sasha' Pechersky
- Hartmut Becker as SS-Hauptscharführer Gustav Wagner
- Jack Shepherd as Itzhak Lichtman
- Emil Wolk as Samuel Freiberg
- Simon Gregor as Stanisław 'Shlomo' Szmajzner
- Linal Haft as Kapo Porchek
- Jason Norman as Thomas 'Toivi' Blatt
- Robert Gwilym as Chaim Engel
- Eli Nathenson as Moses Szmajzner
- Kurt Raab as SS-Oberscharführer Karl Frenzel
- Eric Caspar as SS-Hauptsturmführer Franz Reichleitner
- Hugo Bower as SS-Oberscharführer Rudolf Beckmann
- Klaus Grünberg as SS-Oberscharführer Erich Bauer
- Wolfgang Bathke as SS-Unterscharführer Hurst
- Henning Gissel as SS-Scharführer Josef Fallaster
- Henry Stolow as SS-Untersturmführer Johann Niemann
- Ullrich Haupt as SS-Scharführer Josef Wolf
- Patti Love as Eda Fiszer Lichtman
- Judith Sharp as Bajle Sobol
- Ellis van Maarseveen as Selma Wijnberg
- David Miller as Tailor Mundek
- Jack Chissick as Hershel Zuckerman
- Ned Vukovic as Morris
- Sara Sugarman as Naomi
- Peter Jonfield as Kapo Sturm
- Dijana Kržanić as Esther Terner
- Irfan Mensur as Kalimali
- Zoran Stojiljković as Boris
- Svetolik Nikačević as Old Man
- Miša Janketić as Oberkapo Berliner
- Dejan Čavić as Kapo Spitz
- Zlatan Fazlagić as Weiss
- Predrag Milinković as Kapo Jacob
- Svetislav Goncić as Gardener
- Gojko Baletić as Guard (uncredited)
- Milan Erak as SS Corporal (uncredited)
- Rastislav Jović as Shlomo's Father (uncredited)
- Erol Kadić as Gardener
- Miroljub Lešo as Prisoner (uncredited)
- Bozidar Pavićević-Longa as SS-Sturmmann Ivan Klatt (uncredited)
- Howard K. Smith as Narrator (American version) (uncredited)
- Dragomir Stanojević as Guard (uncredited)
- Predrag Todorović as Guard (uncredited)
- Jelena Žigon as Shlomo's Mother (uncredited)

== Production ==
=== Casting ===
Rutger Hauer, cast as Lieutenant Aleksander 'Sasha' Pechersky, was known to audiences mostly for playing "bad guys". A few years prior, he had played Albert Speer, the Nazi economics minister, in Inside the Third Reich. Hauer expressed no issues in playing a Jew, stating in an interview that "the whole idea of a Jewish type was a fiction created by Hitler, anyway". Hauer did not meet Pechersky.

Producer Dennis E. Doty noted that "internal energy" was a factor when casting actors for roles, describing Hauer as an "outgoing, tough, bombastic, theatrical man".

=== Filming ===
The television drama took 2 months to film during the summer of 1986, near the outskirts of Belgrade, Yugoslavia, in Lipovička šuma. It cost around $6 million and included about 600 extras to shoot the scenes of the escape. Doty told television critics that the scale of brutality depicted in the film had to be scaled back, as he did not think audiences would accept portrayal of the true level of violence that inmates experienced.

=== Survivor involvement ===
Three camp survivors worked as consultants, including Thomas Blatt, who is portrayed as a child in the film. Blatt provided a small model of the camp's layout, which helped design the set for the film. In an interview, he recalled escaping the camp with three others and was hidden by a farmer, who later came and shot him and his friends. Blatt took a bullet to his jaw and pretended to be dead as the farmer took his personal items. Blatt was unconcerned about which actors were chosen, highlighting that it was of greater importance to tell the story. Arkin described in an interview how Blatt became "so excited" while scenes of the escape were being filmed, that he joined the actors in escaping into the woods, taking several hours to find him.

Esther Rabb, another survivor, also served as a consultant for the film. She was 10 years old when sent to Sobibor. After watching the film, she described it as "so real that it's scary". About 20 camp survivors who escaped were alive at the time of filming.

== Reception ==
=== Critical response ===
Writing for the Lincoln Courier, Robert Laurence believed the film had shortcomings, such as the failure to explain why Leon was regarded as a leader in the camp, as well as the general appearance of inmates looking better than may have been expected in reality. However, he accepted that the story needed telling and not to be forgotten. John Carman of the San Francisco Chronicle wrote favourably of the film, complimenting its "exceptional cast and polished script" and considered the story to be well told.

=== Reactions ===
The film caused controversy among Ukrainian-American and Ukrainian-Canadian groups. They objected to how the film showed Ukrainian guards helping the Nazis, arguing that it created a negative stereotype of Ukrainians as anti-semitic. These groups protested and asked CBS to make changes to the film, as well as seeking support from Jewish organisations. Demonstrations took place outside several CBS studios and the groups even called for a boycott of Chrysler, the film's sponsor. A spokesperson for CBS and Chrysler defended the film, saying it was historically researched, used interviews from survivors and was not meant to offend or insult.

While Elan Steinberg of the World Jewish Congress supported the protests, he accepted that many guards at Sobibor were Ukrainian. At the same time, he warned that the film could unfairly suggest that all Ukrainians were responsible, since it did not show the role of other European groups or acknowledge Ukrainians who risked their lives to protect Jews.

One of the Ukrainian protest groups sued CBS in June 1987, alleging that its broadcast falsely depicted Ukrainians as "Nazi mercenaries" and that it implied all non-SS guards were Ukrainian, misrepresenting accounts discussed in the book on which the film was based.

== See also ==
- List of Holocaust films
- List of survivors of Sobibor
- Sobibor (2018), film about the same topic starring Konstantin Khabensky
- The Grey Zone (2001), film about the uprising in Auschwitz-Birkenau
