= Kulczyn-Kolonia =

- Village
- Location within Poland
- Coordinates: 51°22′48″N 23°20′51″E
- Country: Poland
- Voivodeship: Lublin
- County: Włodawa
- Gmina: Hańsk

Kulczyn-Kolonia [ˈkult͡ʂɨn kɔˈlɔɲa] is a village in the administrative district of Gmina Hańsk, within Włodawa County, Lublin Voivodeship, in eastern Poland.
