= Kulczyn, Lublin Voivodeship =

Kulczyn
- Village
- Location within Poland
- Coordinates: 51°23′N 23°19′E
- Country: Poland
- Voivodeship: Lublin
- County: Włodawa
- Gmina: Hańsk

Kulczyn [ˈkult͡ʂɨn] is a village in the administrative district of Gmina Hańsk, within Włodawa County, Lublin Voivodeship, in eastern Poland.
