= Hilda Eisen =

American businessperson and philanthropist (1917–2017)

- Born: Hilda Gimpel; April 24, 1917; Izbica Kujawska, Kingdom of Poland
- Died: November 22, 2017 (aged 100); Beverly Hills, California, US
- Resting place: Hillside Memorial Park Cemetery
- Citizenship: United States
- Occupations: Businessperson, Philanthropist

Hilda Eisen (née Gimpel; April 25, 1917 – November 22, 2017) was a Polish-American businessperson, philanthropist, and Holocaust survivor.

== Early life ==
Hilda Gimpel was born on April 24, 1917, in Izbica Kujawska, then part of the Kingdom of Poland (1917–1918). She was the second of seven children. Her mother was a grain dealer and her father a baker. She later reflected that she had a "peaceful girlhood" and would often dance to Jewish music and go to the movies.

In 1939, Eisen and her first husband, David, were taken from their neighborhood, which was invaded by German soldiers and imprisoned in the Lublin Ghetto. They were later transported by cattle wagons to labor camps. A German soldier helped Hilda to escape and join the Parczew partisans. Later, Eisen was recaptured by German forces and taken to a police station where she was interrogated. She counteracted and jumped from a second-story window, breaking her foot. During her escape, a German soldier showed Eisen compassion by shooting lower than the high fence she was scrambling to get over.

After the war, Eisen learned that she had lost her parents and all five siblings to the Holocaust. Her husband, David, died as a member of the resistance fighters while searching for Hilda. Surviving for two winters, and forced to sleep on the ground, Eisen hoped a Russian officer would escort her to visit her husband's grave. Cursing her, the officer told Eisen her husband was "lucky" to have someone weep for him. No one would cry for her. The officer asked why it was "important to visit graves". Hilda realized the officer had a point; there was no time for crying. She simply said, "You're going to see what the next day will bring."

Eisen married another survivor, Harry Eisen. They moved to California and became millionaires with a large chicken egg distribution business. She died on November 22, 2017, and was survived by her daughters Ruth Eisen, Mary Cramer, and Francis Miller, eight grandchildren and seven great-grandchildren. A son, Howard, had died in 2014.

== Career ==
=== Egg distribution business ===
Eisen sold eggs and raised chickens while her husband, Harry, also worked at a Vernon, California, hot dog factory cleaning meat barrels. The pair saved to purchase 100 chickens and started a business in Arcadia, California. In the 1950s, they moved their business operations to Norco, California. Their company was later named Norco Ranch Inc. The couple became multimillionaires and philanthropists after the company became the largest egg distributor west of the Rocky Mountains. They later sold the company to an agribusiness in Minnesota. At the time of the sale in 2000, the business had 450 employees and $100 million in annual sales.

=== Philanthropy ===
The Eisens were prominent members of the Norco community. They funded a group resisting an attempt by developers to have Norco incorporate in 1964. They later donated $10,000 to the city to help keep it operational. Eisen was known as a "constant voice for the remembrance of the atrocities of World War II." She and her husband were contributors to the United States Holocaust Memorial Museum and were present at its dedication in 1993. She was a leader of the Lodzer Organization of Southern California, a group of Holocaust survivors who donate to Jewish charities in Israel and locally. In 2016, she donated an ambulance to Magen David Adom for her 99th birthday and in honor of her late husband.

== Personal life ==
In 1945, Hilda married a former high school classmate, Harry Eisen, in Munich. In an interview, she said: "I'll tell you the truth: I got married out of fear, being scared to be alone in this world, no family, no friends ... He had the same feeling. He didn't love me, I didn't love him." The couple lived for three years in refugee camps before sailing to New York City in May 1948 on the SS Marine Flasher. They had no money and spoke no English. They took a train to Los Angeles where one of Harry's cousins resided. They lived in Boyle Heights. In 1952, the family moved to Norco. They became naturalized citizens of the United States in 1953.

Eisen was interviewed about her experiences in the Holocaust by the USC Shoah Foundation Institute for Visual History and Education on June 18, 2001. She died at the age of 100 on November 22, 2017, in Beverly Hills. She had three daughters and a son. Her son predeceased her. She was survived by three daughters, eight grandchildren, and six great-grandchildren. Eisen is interred at the Hillside Memorial Park Cemetery.

== See also ==
- List of Holocaust survivors
