= Winterlingen =

German municipality

- Municipality
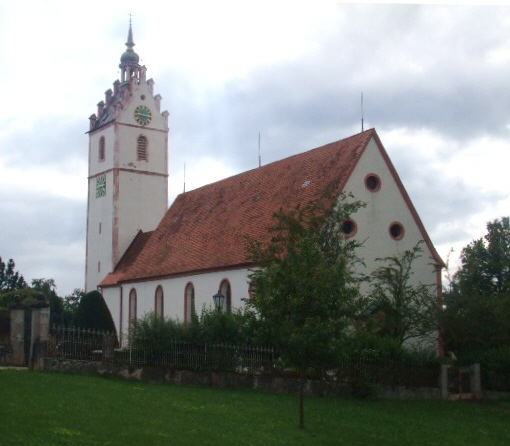
- Benzingen parish church

- Coat of arms

- Location of Winterlingen within Zollernalbkreis district
- Interactive map of Winterlingen
- Location within Germany Location within Baden-Württemberg
- Coordinates: 48°10′47″N 09°06′55″E
- Country: Germany
- State: Baden-Württemberg
- Admin. region: Tübingen
- District: Zollernalbkreis
- Subdivisions: 3 Ortsteile

Area
  - Total: 50.63 km^{2} (19.55 sq mi)
- Elevation: 789 m (2,589 ft)

Population (2025-12-31)
  - Total: 6,336
  - Density: 125.1/km^{2} (324.1/sq mi)
- Time zone: UTC+01:00 (CET)
  - Summer (DST): UTC+02:00 (CEST)
- Postal codes: 72470–72474
- Dialling codes: 07434
- Vehicle registration: BL
- Website: www.winterlingen.de

Winterlingen (German pronunciation: [ˈvɪntɐlɪŋən]) is a municipality in the Zollernalbkreis district of Baden-Württemberg, Germany.

== History ==
Winterlingen was first documented around 1264 as a possession of the County of Hohenberg. It was purchased by the County of Württemberg around 1387. After 1469, Winterlingen was permanently a possession of Württemberg. It was assigned to Oberamt Balingen, though it was briefly reassigned in 1810 to Oberamt Ebingen. In 1938, the Oberamt of Balingen was reorganized as Landkreis Balingen. Some residential and commercial expansion of Winterlingen took place before World War II, and it slowly expanded after the war starting in the 1950s to the north and southwest. In 1942 Selma Burkard killed in tragedy of the Holocaust. There was additional development in the 1970s, and the reassignment of Winterlingen in 1973, following the 1973 Baden-Württemberg district reform, to the newly created Zollernalb district.

== Geography ==
Winterlingen is a municipality (Gemeinde) of Zollernalb district of Baden-Württemberg, one of the 16 States of the Federal Republic of Germany. It lies along the south-eastern edge of the district and borders the district of Sigmaringen to the east. Winterlingen is physically located in the Middle Flächenalb, between the valleys of the Schmiech and Lauchert rivers. A small portion of the area is located in the Baar region to the west. Elevation above sea level in the municipal area ranges from a high of 902 meters (2,959 ft) Normalnull (NN) to a low of 632 meters (2,073 ft) NN.

== Coat of arms ==
The coat of arms for Winterlingen displays two general areas, divided vertically into two halves. The left half has two fields: an upper white and a lower red, and the right half has a yellow half with three stag antlers. These are, respectively, the coats of arms for the County of Hohenberg, impaled with that of Württemberg. This pattern is from a seal that began usage in Winterlingen's town hall in 1930 and replaced an earlier seal, used by the local Schultheiß. This coat of arms was approved by the post-WWII provisional Württemberg-Hohenzollern government on 13 July 1951.

== Stolpersteine ==
The following people have been memorialized with stolpersteine:

- Dr. Emil Burkart (1884–1957), degree in Human Medicin, entomologist about 9.000 specimens in the State Museum of Natural History Stuttgart
- Selma Burkart (1885–1942), Holocaust victim further research create the Sister City Izbica/Winterlingen

== Web ==
- Sammlung Hieronymus Edelmann (1853–1921), Hyronimus Edelmann British Museum
