= Avrom Greenbaum =

Scottish playwright and director

- Aby Greenbaum
- Born: 1903; Lublin, Poland
- Died: 1963 (aged 59–60); Glasgow, Scotland
- Other name: Abraham Green
- Citizenship: British
- Occupations: Actor, Playwright, Director, Founder of the Glasgow Jewish Institute Players

Avrom Greenbaum (1903–1963), also known as Aby or Abie Greenbaum, was a playwright and theatre director. He founded the Glasgow Jewish Institute Players (GJIP), a community theater group active in Glasgow from the mid-1930s until the early-1960s.

== Early life and education ==
Born in Izbica, Lublin, Poland, Avrom Greenbaum was one of five children in a family that came to Scotland when he was 15 months old. His family worked in tailoring and related to culture, music, and literature.

At the age of 11, Greenbaum organized his school’s annual concert party, writing songs and sketches for the accompanying entertainment.

== Career ==
After seeing both Shakespeare at Glasgow's Theatre Royal and the Vilna Theatre troupe performing The Dybbuk in Yiddish, he continued to write and perform pieces on the Jewish community. In the early 1920s, he wrote, produced, and directed an unnamed one-act play for the Glasgow Young Zionists’ Literary Circle at the Talmud Torah in Turriff Street, Glasgow, for which he also starred in the lead role and played violin in the orchestra for the overture of Boieldieu’s The Caliph of Baghdad.

Greenbaum then began producing short, one-act dramas, featuring his own plays, such as The Bread of Affliction (1936), a drama depicting a family caught up in a pogrom in the Ukraine in 1920. The critical attention this play received, and the resulting suggestion that it should be entered into competition, prompted the formal constitution of the Glasgow Jewish Institute Dramatic Club, which would later come to be known as The Glasgow Jewish Institute Players (GJIP).

In the first year of the GJIP theatre group, Greenbaum's production of The Bread of Affliction (1936) reached the national final in the Scottish Community Drama Association (SCDA) competitions for one-act plays, coming in second overall. Following this success, the play was published in the contemporary anthology The Best One-Act Plays of 1937. For these achievements, in 1939, Greenbaum was honoured by the Glasgow Lodge of B'nai B'rith.

Greenbaum's working methods included a focus on the importance of stage design, and collaborations with artists such as Joseph Ancill and Tom Macdonald, and with choreographers such as Margaret Morris.

Due to the scarcity of resources during wartime from December 1940 through 1951, the GJIP combined with Robert Mitchell from the Glasgow Players and Donald McBean from Glasgow Transport Players to form Glasgow Unity Theatre. Greenbaum's experiences with Glasgow Unity Theatre brought about his meeting and collaboration with the stage designer Tom Macdonald, whose modernist designs later became a part of Greenbaum's productions.

Greenbaum had a correspondence with the New York playwright Sylvia Regan that lasted for many years, spanning a period in which GJIP produced plays by the new generation of American Jewish writers, many in British or Scottish premieres. The correspondence began after Regan heard of the popular and critically well-received GJIP's first British performances of her play Morning Star in 1945. As news of their success reached her in New York, Regan wrote to David Lewis, the secretary of GJIP, to send her congratulations. Only one side of the correspondence survived, with Regan's letters to Greenbaum preserved in the Scottish Theatre Archive in Glasgow University Library.

In later life, having developed a reputation within Scottish theatre, the focus of his creative work shifted. His time was spent as a teacher and lecturer at the Scottish Community Drama School and adjudicator at drama festivals.

== Plays ==
- Bread of Affliction, 1936
- Children of Dreams, 1936
- The Fifth Line / Watch on the Clyde, 1940
