= Osowa, Włodawa County =

Osowa
- Village
- Location within Poland
- Coordinates: 51°24′47″N 23°31′32″E
- Country: Poland
- Voivodeship: Lublin
- County: Włodawa
- Gmina: Hańsk

Osowa [ɔˈsɔva] is a village in the administrative district of Gmina Hańsk, within Włodawa County, Lublin Voivodeship, in eastern Poland.

== WWII labor camp Osowa ==
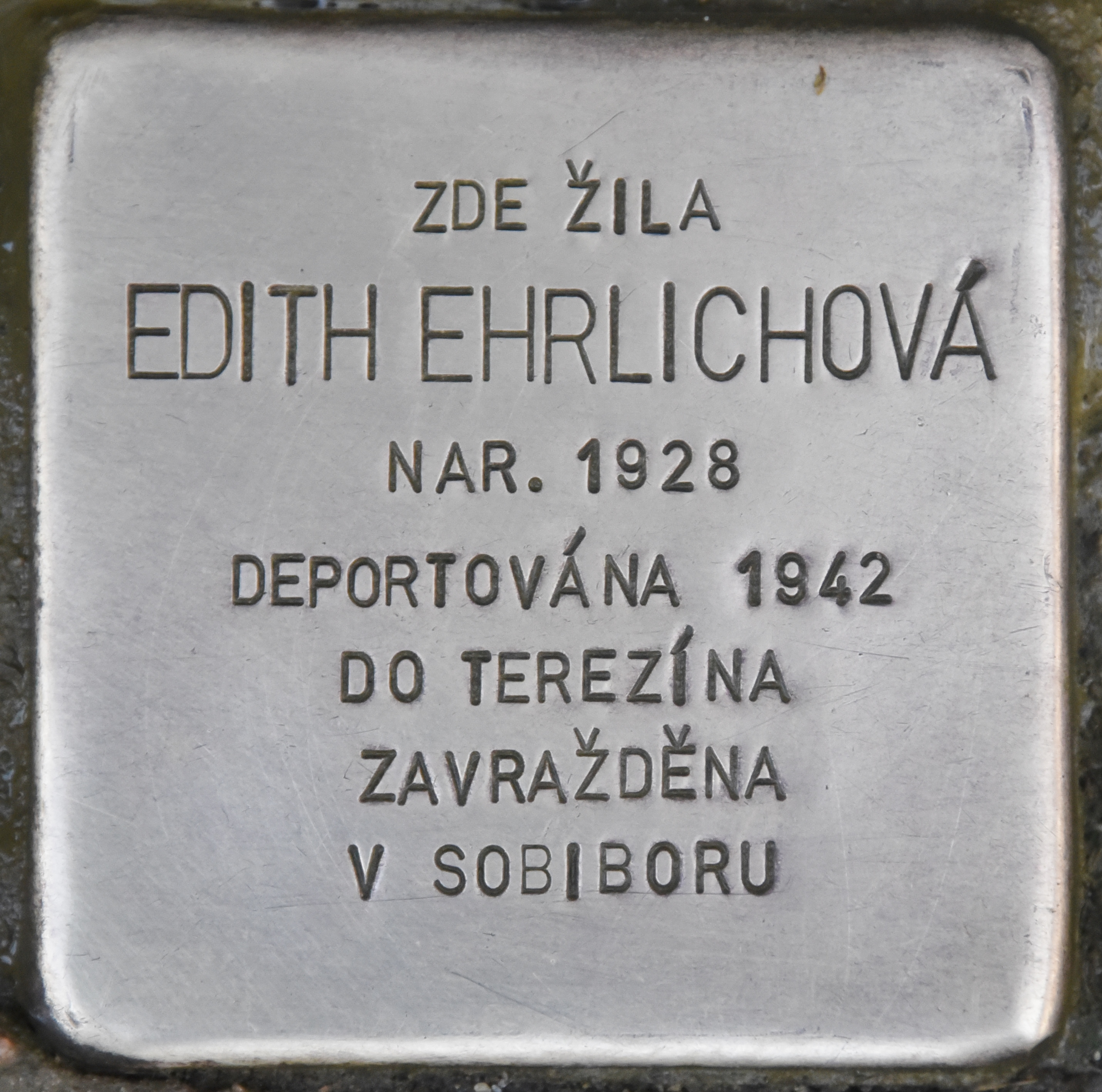
A Stolperstein in Prague, Czech Republic, for Edith Ehrlichova, murdered in Osowa

During World War II the Nazis established a labor camp for Polish Jewish citizens, as well as citizens of other states, mostly Czech Jewish prisoners brought here from the Theresienstadt Ghetto. The camp was founded in 1941 and had an average of about 1,000 prisoners at a time. In total, about 4,000 people passed through the camp. The prisoners worked mostly in melioration of the surrounding meadows. Around 170 people died as a result of harsh working conditions, and another about 70 were executed by the Nazis. The camp was disbanded in 1943 and its prisoners taken to the nearby Sobibor extermination camp, where they were murdered.
