= Elan Steinberg =

Elan Steinberg (1952-2012) was an Israeli-born head of World Jewish Congress.

== Early life and career ==
Elan Steinberg was born to a Polish Jewish family in Rishon LeZion, Israel, in 1952. When he was two years old, his family emigrated to the United States. He graduated from Stuyvesant High School in Manhattan and Brooklyn College. He received a master's degree in political science from the Graduate Center of the City University of New York. Later, he joined the Graduate Center of the City University of New York as a faculty member.

In 1974, he joined World Jewish Congress. When he left the congress in 2004, he was the executive director.

Steinberg also served as a vice president of the American Gathering of Jewish Holocaust Survivors and their Descendants.
