= Tarnogóra, Lublin Voivodeship =

Tarnogóra
- Village
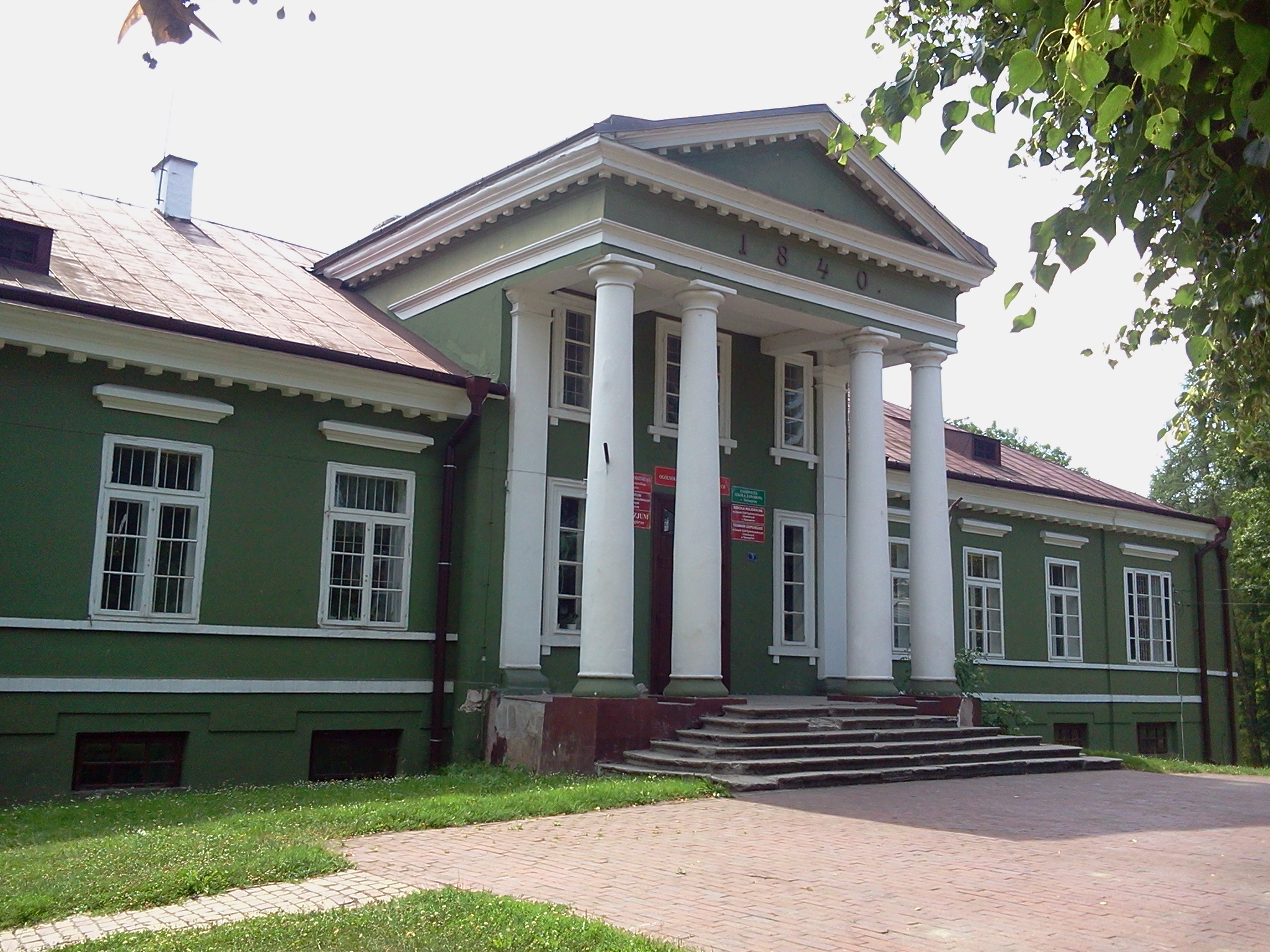
- Tarnogóra Palace

- Location within Poland
- Coordinates: 50°53′N 23°8′E
- Country: Poland
- Voivodeship: Lublin
- County: Krasnystaw
- Gmina: Izbica

Population
  - Total: 952
- Time zone: UTC+1 (CET)
  - Summer (DST): UTC+2 (CEST)
- Vehicle registration: LKS

Tarnogóra [tarnɔˈɡura] is a village in the administrative district of Gmina Izbica, within Krasnystaw County, Lublin Voivodeship, in eastern Poland.

It is situated on the Wieprz River.
