= Żłobek, Podkarpackie Voivodeship =

Żłobek
- Village
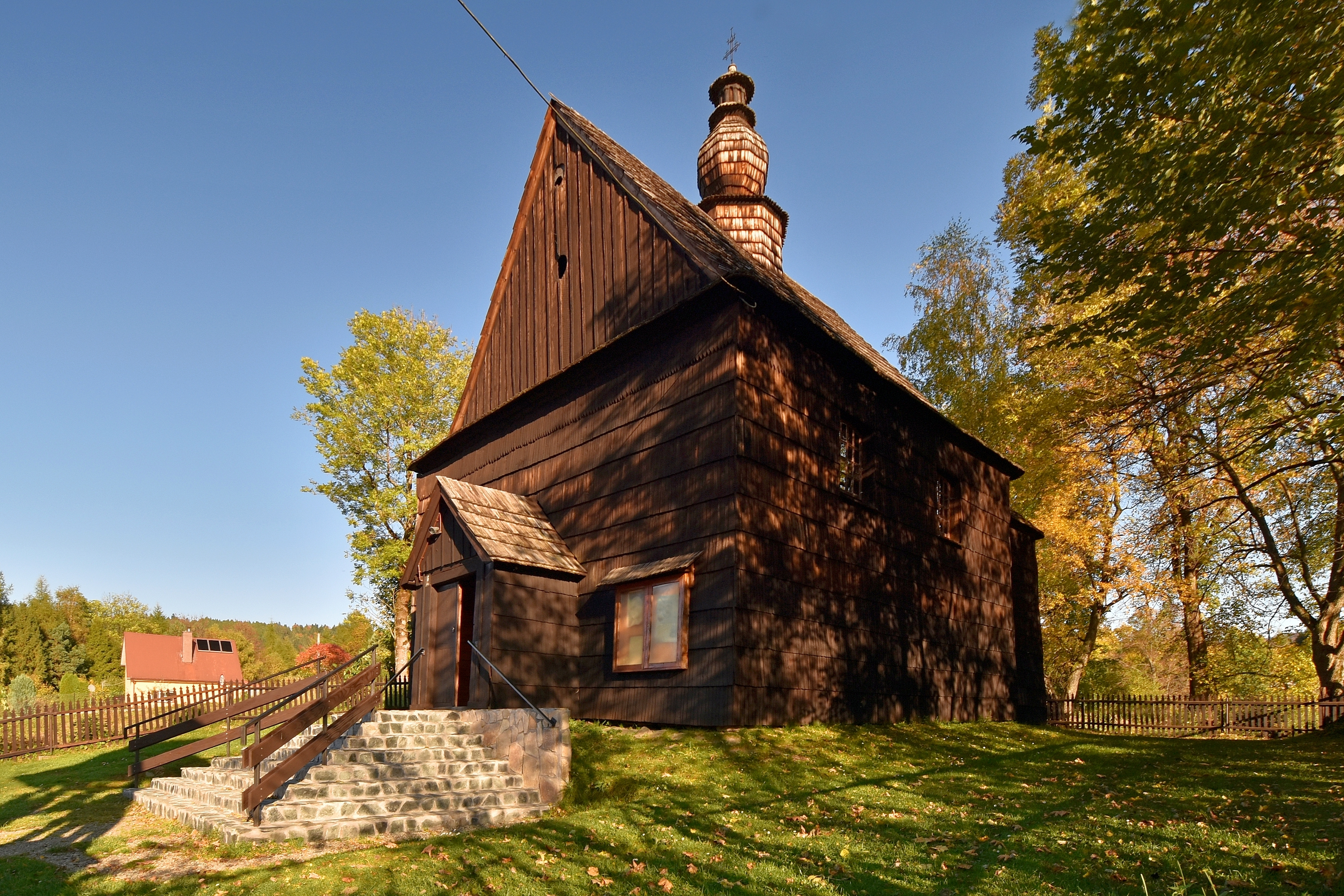

- Location within Poland
- Coordinates: 49°20′46″N 22°40′57″E
- Country: Poland
- Voivodeship: Subcarpathian
- County: Bieszczady
- Gmina: Czarna
- Population: 148

Żłobek [ˈʐwɔbɛk] is a village in the administrative district of Gmina Czarna, within Bieszczady County, Subcarpathian Voivodeship, in south-eastern Poland, close to the border with Ukraine.
