= Ujazdów, Włodawa County =

Ujazdów
- Village
- Location within Poland
- Coordinates: 51°23′21″N 23°22′51″E
- Country: Poland
- Voivodeship: Lublin
- County: Włodawa
- Gmina: Hańsk

Ujazdów [uˈjazduf] is a village in the administrative district of Gmina Hańsk, within Włodawa County, Lublin Voivodeship, in eastern Poland.
