= Gmina Hańsk =

Gmina Hańsk Hańsk Commune
- Gmina
- Flag Coat of arms
- Interactive map of Gmina Hańsk
- Coordinates (Hańsk): 51°24′N 23°24′E
- Country: Poland
- Voivodeship: Lublin
- County: Włodawa
- Seat: Hańsk

Area
  - Total: 179.43 km^{2} (69.28 sq mi)

Population (2006)
  - Total: 3,954
  - Density: 22.04/km^{2} (57.07/sq mi)
- Website: www.hansk.pl

Gmina Hańsk is a rural gmina (administrative district) in Włodawa County, Lublin Voivodeship, in eastern Poland. Its seat is the village of Hańsk, which lies approximately 20 kilometres (12 mi) south-west of Włodawa and 61 km (38 mi) east of the regional capital Lublin.

The gmina covers an area of 179.43 square kilometres (69.3 sq mi), and as of 2006 its total population is 3,954.

== Villages ==
Gmina Hańsk contains the villages and settlements of Bukowski Las, Dubeczno, Hańsk, Hańsk Drugi, Hańsk-Kolonia, Konstantynówka, Kulczyn, Kulczyn-Kolonia, Macoszyn Mały, Osowa, Rudka Łowiecka, Stary Majdan, Szcześniki, Ujazdów, Wojciechów and Żdżarka.

== Neighbouring gminas ==
Gmina Hańsk is bordered by the gminas of Sawin, Stary Brus, Urszulin, Wierzbica, Włodawa, Wola Uhruska and Wyryki.
