= Parczew partisans =

The Parczew partisans were Jewish fighters in irregular military groups participating in the Jewish resistance movement against Nazi Germany and its collaborators during World War II. The name of the partisan force, coined by the Holocaust historians, is borrowed from the Parczew forest located a short distance away from Lublin, halfway to the town of Sobibór, the location of the Sobibór extermination camp during the Holocaust in occupied Poland. The Jews who managed to escape from the camp hid in there along with the considerable number of Jewish families of the Lublin Ghetto.

The area including Parczew and Włodawa counties near Lublin in the General Government became one of the primary battlefields of the Jewish partisan movement. An area of forests and lakes with few passable roads, the Parczew forests were an ideal location for partisan activity. Notable partisan leaders included Ephraim (Frank) Bleichman, Harold Werner, and Shmuel (Mieczysław) Gruber. Werner and Gruber were second-in-command to Yechiel Grynszpan, who led Jewish forces in the Parczew forest, and Bleichman was one of Grynszpan's two platoon commanders.

The same forest constituted the main base of the non-Jewish Polish partisan movement as well. Such high concentration of resistance including Gwardia Ludowa (GL), Bataliony Chłopskie (BCh), and Armia Krajowa (AK) was possible only due to strong material support from the surrounding counties.

== History ==
The group fought along with the People's Guard (Polish: Gwardia Ludowa) in a number of intense engagements against German forces, making use of machine guns, explosives for mining railways, and other supplies air-dropped by Soviet forces, with food stuffs requisitioned from local farmers. They participated in the takeover of the city of Parczew on April 16, 1944.

After Operation Barbarossa, the German military and Orpo aided by the Ukrainian Auxiliary Police battalions, began mass deportations of Polish inhabitants of Zamojszczyzna south of Chełm in preparation for the Generalplan Ost resettlement ordered by Reichsführer-SS Heinrich Himmler. Some Polish villages were simply razed and their inhabitants massacred. During Heim ins Reich Ukraineraktion (pl), pro-Nazi Ukrainians and German-Ukrainian Volksdeutsche were being resettled there along with ethnic Germans from the east. They were given new latifundia built by Jewish prisoners of the Lublin Reservation who were sent to nearby Sobibór extermination camp afterwards. The Polish underground retaliated by launching the Zamość uprising, considered to be among the largest actions of the Polish resistance during World War II. Some Ukrainian sources refer to this operation as a massacre of Ukrainian villagers near Chelm and in the Podlasie area, and attribute thousands of those killed to the Polish underground. Such claims are rejected by the Institute of National Remembrance, and debunked by Ukrainian authors of the Historical Dictionary of Ukraine who point out that recent studies confirm a much lower figure. According to Jewish sources, the Jewish partisans themselves used to execute Ukrainian villagers "who had gone to the woods to round up the Jews who had escaped" from the ghettos. The killings in villages near the Parczew forest were motivated by revenge for the "anti-Jewish activities" of the Ukrainian peasants.

== See also ==
- Frank Blaichman Controversy
- Hilda Eisen, member of Jewish resistance

== Notes and references ==
- Parczew Partisans, Chelm.freeyellow.com
