= List of victims of Sobibor =

This is a list of people who were murdered in the Sobibor extermination camp. The United States Holocaust Memorial Museum states that at least 170,000 people were murdered there. The Dutch Sobibor Foundation lists a calculated total of 170,165 people and cites the Höfle Telegram among its sources, while noting that other estimates range up to 300,000. For practical reasons it is not possible to list all the people murdered at the camp. The operatives of the Nazi regime not only robbed Jews of their earthly possessions and their lives but attempted to eradicate all traces of their existence as they engaged in the genocidal policies of the Final Solution.

Male
Female

Name	Date of birth	Date of death	Age	Nationality	Faith	Notes
Mozes Jacobs	November 26, 1905	July 9, 1943	37 years, 225 days	Dutch	Jewish	Gymnast. Participated at the 1928 Summer Olympics in Amsterdam.
Walter M. Poppert	March 26, 1914	October 30, 1943	29 years, 218 days	German	Jewish	Husband of Gertrud Poppert née Schönborn. In 1943, he was foreman of the Waldkommando in the Sobibor Extermination camp.
Max van Dam	March 19, 1910	September 20, 1943	33 years, 185 days	Dutch	Jewish	Artist
Abraham de Oliveira	May 4, 1880	March 26, 1943	62 years, 326 days	Dutch	Jewish	Gymnast
Isidore Goudeket	August 1, 1883	July 9, 1943	59 years, 342 days	Dutch	Jewish	Gymnast
Anna Dresden-Polak	November 24, 1906	July 23, 1943	36 years, 241 days	Dutch	Jewish	Gymnast. Her husband Barend Dresden was murdered at Auschwitz on November 30, 1944.
Eva Dresden	June 26, 1937	July 23, 1943	6 years, 27 days	Dutch	Jewish	Daughter of Anna Dresden-Polak and Barend Dresden (murdered at Auschwitz, November 30, 1944).
Jud Simons	August 20, 1904	March 20, 1943	38 years, 212 days	Dutch	Jewish	Gymnast
Bernard Salomon Themans	April 5, 1909	March 20, 1943	33 years, 349 days	Dutch	Jewish	Husband of Judik Themans née Simons.
Sonja Themans	March 9, 1938	March 20, 1943	5 years, 11 days	Dutch	Jewish	Daughter of Judik Themans née Simons and Bernard Themans.
Leon Themans	February 28, 1940	March 20, 1943	3 years, 27 days	Dutch	Jewish	Son of Judik Themans née Simons and Bernard Themans
Emanuel Querido	August 6, 1871	July 23, 1943	71 years, 320 days	Dutch	Jewish	Publisher. His wife was also murdered at the camp at the same time.
Leo Smit	May 14, 1900	April 30, 1943	42 years, 351 days	Dutch	Jewish	Composer
Michel Velleman	January 5, 1895	July 2, 1943	48 years, 178 days	Dutch	Jewish	Magician
Helga Deen	April 6, 1925	July 16, 1943	18 years, 101 days	German	Jewish	Diarist. Her parents and brother were murdered at the same time.
Else Feldmann	February 25, 1884	June 1942	58 years	Austrian	Jewish	Writer, playwright, poet, socialist journalist
Jakob van Hoddis	May 16, 1887	c.April 30, 1942	54 years, 349 days	German	Jewish	Poet, generally regarded with writing the preliminary expressionist poem, inspiring countless poets Mentally ill, transported to Sobibor along with the 500 patients and staff of his sanitorium on April 30, 1942, all of whom perished.
Han Hollander	October 5, 1886	July 9, 1943	56 years, 277 days	Dutch	Jewish	First Dutch radio sports journalist
Leentje Hollander-Smeer	October 6, 1886	July 9, 1943	56 years, 276 days	Dutch	Jewish	Wife of Han Hollander. Their daughter Froukje Esther Waterman-Hollander was murdered at Auschwitz on February 28, 1943.
Elisabeth Kleerekoper	October 14, 1928	July 2, 1943	14 years, 261 days	Dutch	Jewish	Daughter of Gerrit Kleerekoper and Kaatje Kleerekoper-
Gerrit Kleerekoper	February 15, 1897	July 2, 1943	46 years, 137 days	Dutch	Jewish	Coach of the women's gymnastic team which won the gold medal at the 1928 Summer Olympics in Amsterdam
Kaatje Kleerekoper-Ossedrijver	August 29, 1895	July 2, 1943	47 years, 307 days	Dutch	Jewish	Spouse of Gerrit Kleerekoper
Abraham Kloot	July 28, 1902	July 2, 1943	40 years, 339 days	Dutch	Jewish	Spouse of Helena Kloot née Nordheim
Kurt Lilien	August 6, 1882	May 28, 1943	60 years, 295 days	German	Jewish	Film and stage actor
Helena Nordheim	August 1, 1903	July 2, 1943	39 years, 335 days	Dutch	Jewish	Gymnast, member of the women's gymnastic team which won the gold medal at the 1928 Summer Olympics in Amsterdam
Rebecca Kloot	April 12, 1933	July 2, 1943	10 years, 81 days	Dutch	Jewish	Daughter of Helena Kloot née Nordheim and Abraham Kloot

== Survivors of Sobibor ==
There are fifty-eight known survivors; forty-eight male and ten female, among those who were in the camp as Arbeitshäftlinge, deportees selected from arriving transports to perform slave-labour for the daily operation of the camp. Their time in the camp ranged from several weeks to almost two years. A handful of Arbeitshäftlinge managed to escape while assigned to the Waldkommando, inmate details assigned the task of felling and preparing trees for the body disposal pyres. The majority of the survivors among Sobibor's Arbeitshäftlinge survived as a result of their camp-wide revolt on October 14, 1943. Dutch historian Jules Schelvis estimated that 158 inmates perished in the revolt, killed by the guards and the minefield surrounding the camp, and that a further 107 were re-captured and murdered by the SS, Wehrmacht and Police units tasked with pursuing the escapees. He estimates that another 53 escapees died of other causes between the day of the revolt and May 8, 1945. In the aftermath of the revolt, the remaining camp inmates were murdered and the camp dismantled. Schelvis estimated that at the time of the escape there had been approximately 650 inmates in the camp.

Among the Sobibor survivors are also those who were spared the gas chambers in the camp as a result of transfer to slave-labour camps in the Lublin district, after selections upon arrival at Sobibor. These people spent several hours at Sobibor and were transferred almost immediately to slave-labour camps, including Majdanek and Alter Flugplatz camp in the city of Lublin, where materials looted from the gassed victims were prepared for shipment and distribution, and forced labour camps such as Krychów, Dorohucza and Trawniki. Estimates for the number of people selected in Sobibor range up to several thousand, of whom many perished in captivity before the end of the Nazi regime. The total number of survivors in this cohort includes 16 known survivors, 13 women and 3 men, from among the 34,313 people deported to Sobibor from the Netherlands.
