= Hańsk =

- Village
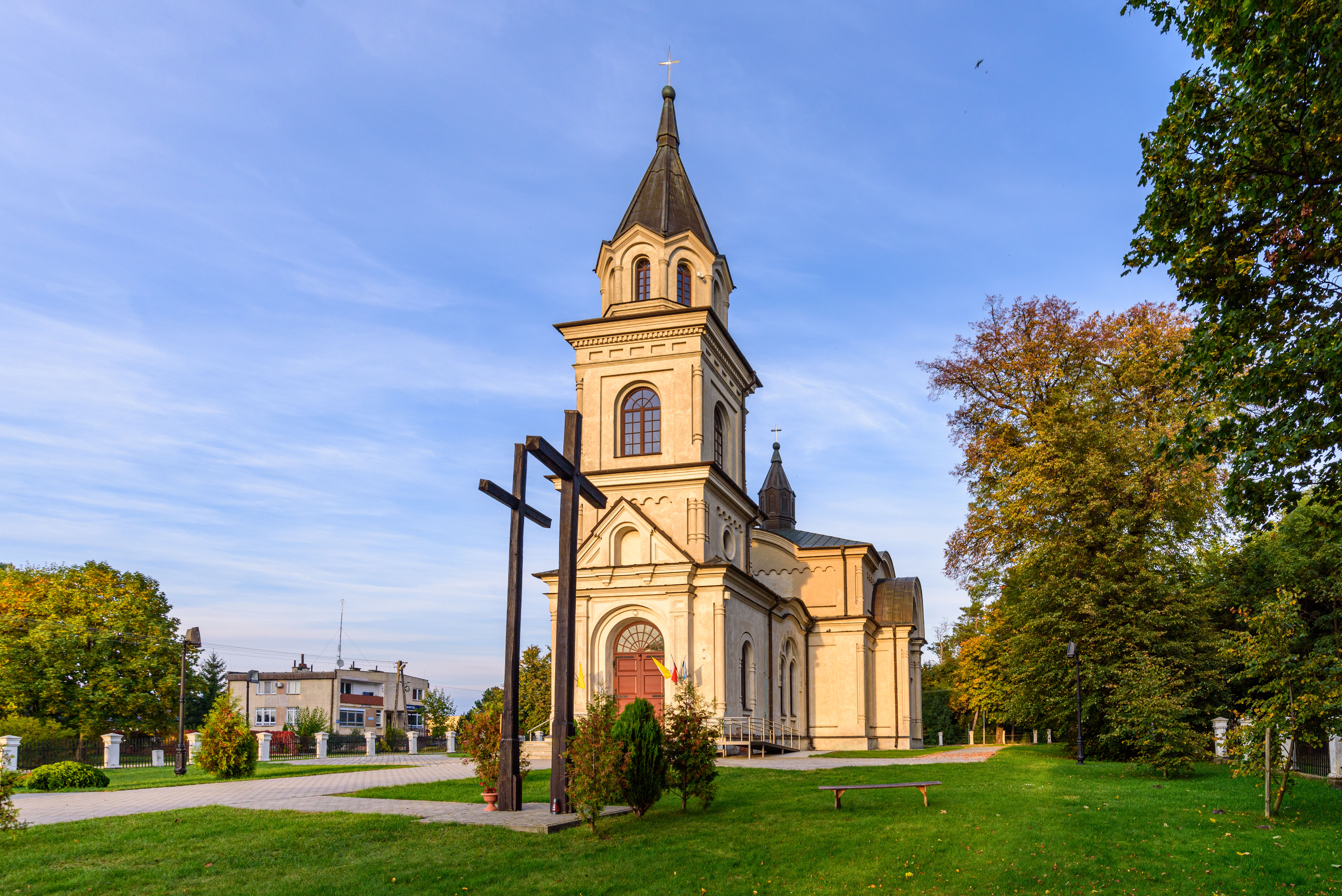
- Church of Saint Raymond

- Location within Poland
- Coordinates: 51°24′N 23°24′E
- Country: Poland
- Voivodeship: Lublin
- County: Włodawa
- Gmina: Hańsk
- Time zone: UTC+1 (CET)
  - Summer (DST): UTC+2 (CEST)

Hańsk [xaɲsk] is a village in Włodawa County, Lublin Voivodeship, in eastern Poland. It is the seat of the gmina (administrative district) called Gmina Hańsk.

== History ==
Three Polish citizens were murdered by Nazi Germany in the village during World War II.
