= Izbica Ghetto =

Jewish ghetto during World War Two

- Ghetto and Transit camp
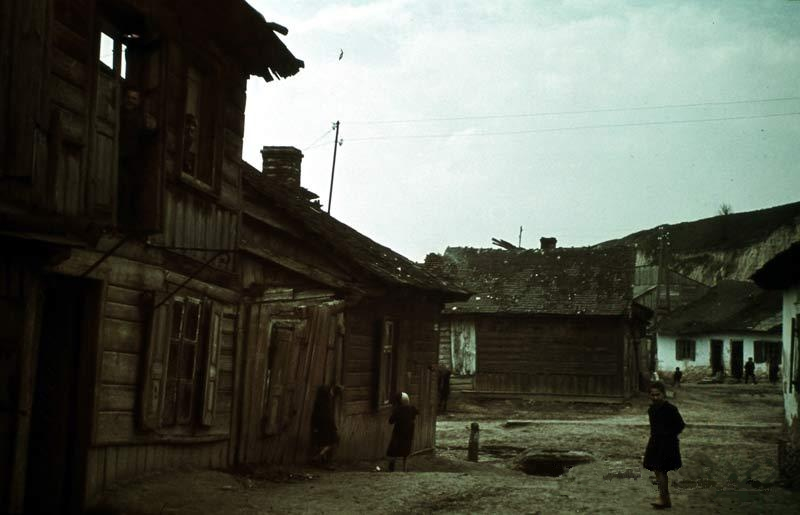
- Izbica Ghetto Izbica location south-east of Lublin near Belzec during World War II

- Location of former Izbica Ghetto in modern Poland
- Coordinates: 50°53′N 23°10′E
- Known for: The Holocaust in Poland
- Operated by: Schutzstaffel
- Operational: 1940–1943

The Izbica ghetto was a Jewish ghetto created by Nazi Germany in Izbica in occupied Poland during World War II, serving as a transfer point for deportation of Jews from Poland, Germany, Austria and Czechoslovakia to Bełżec and Sobibór extermination camps. The ghetto was created in 1941, although the first transports of Jews from the German Reich started arriving there as early as 1940. Izbica was the largest transit ghetto in the Lublin reservation, with a death rate almost equal to that of the Warsaw Ghetto. SS-Hauptsturmführer Kurt Engels, known for his exceptional cruelty, served as its only commandant.

== Ghetto operation ==
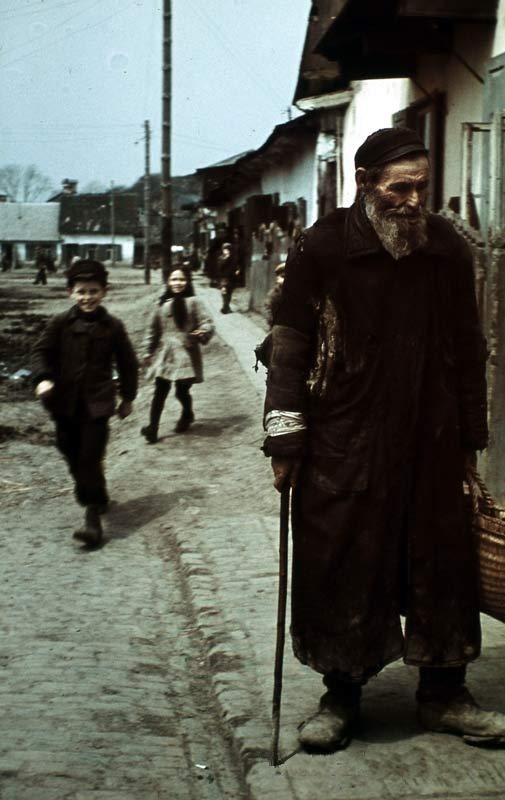
Jews in Izbica Ghetto

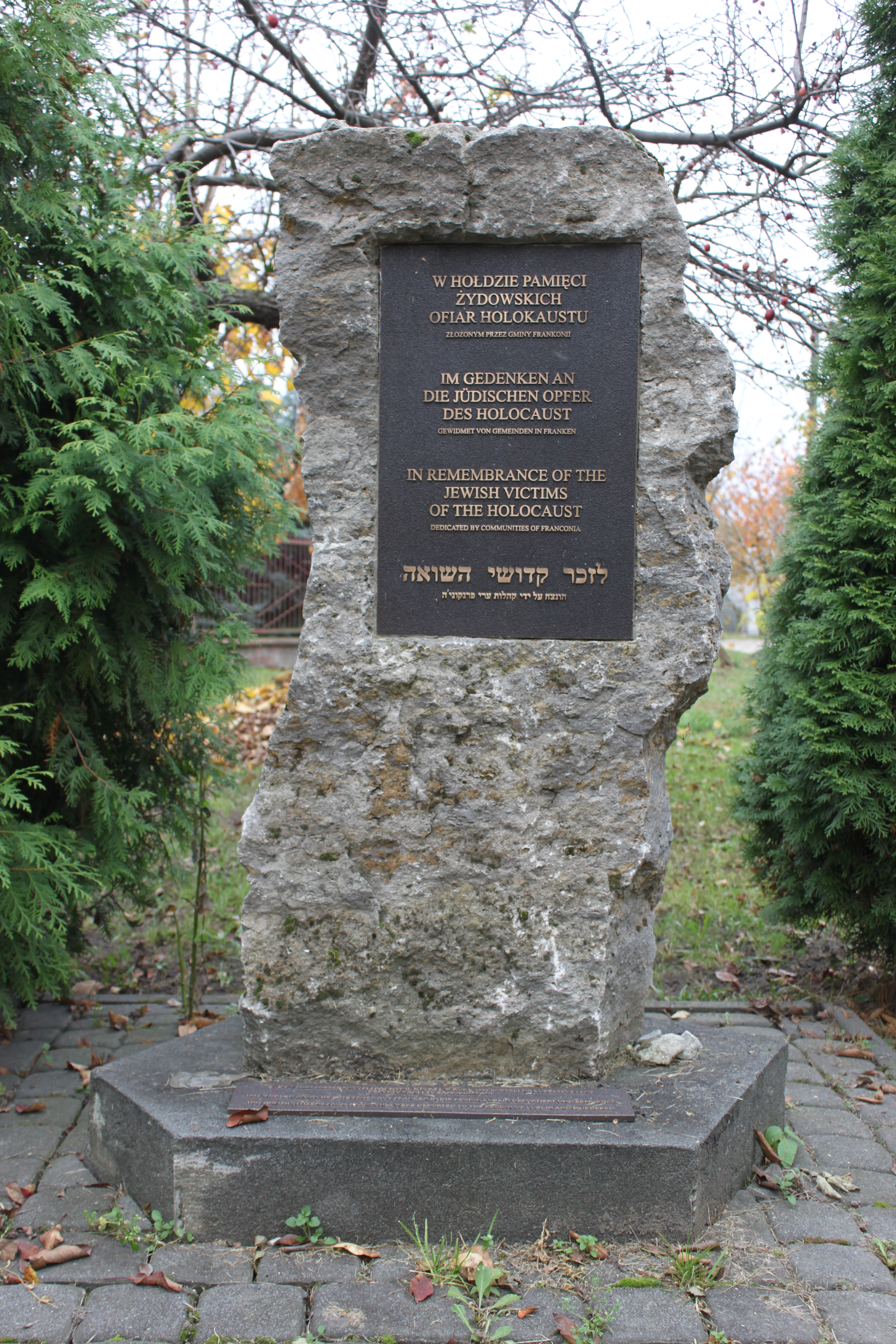
Izbica Ghetto memorial

The Jews who lived in Izbica were kept separate from the new arrivals. They were housed on the other side of the railroad tracks. Also, the Jews shipped in from Germany and Austria were differentiated from Polish Jews by the color of the obligatory star of David signs, yellow for German, and blue for the Polish Jews. In order to make space for the incoming transports, 2,200 local Jews were sent to the Belzec death camp on March 24, 1942. Between March and May 1942, approximately 12,000 to 15,000 new Jews were transported to Izbica from across Europe as part of secretive Operation Reinhard; among them engineers, doctors, economists, army generals and professors from Vienna, The Hague, Heidelberg and Breslau, including the vice-president of Prague. They were housed in a few wooden barracks which could accommodate about half of the prisoners, pressed against each other like sardines. The rest were forced to subsist outdoors. Jews stayed in the barracks usually for no more than four days, with almost nothing to eat. Many victims succumbed to typhus due to poor sanitary conditions in the ghetto. The foreigners, many of whom were proficient in German, had an easier time identifying with their Nazi oppressors than the Polish Jews from inside the ghetto. Denunciations were commonplace.

=== Mass killings ===
In the early stage of the ghetto existence, the Nazis destroyed the local Jewish cemetery. The tombstones were desecrated and used to build walls of a new prison. The entire ghetto in Izbica was liquidated beginning November 2, 1942, which led to a week of horrific killings at the cemetery. Several thousand Jews (estimated at 4,500) were massacred by the Sonderdienst battalion of Ukrainian Trawnikis in an assembly-line-style, and dumped into hastily dug mass graves. The murders were committed by trained killers who drank heavily, but the soldiers of German Reserve Police Battalion 101 who rounded up the condemned prisoners drank also, especially at night. A second, smaller ghetto was set up in its place for about 1,000 local Jews. It was dismantled on April 28, 1943 with all remaining inmates sent to Sobibor death camp. Of all the Jewish citizens of Izbica (over 90% of its pre-war population), only 14 survived the Holocaust. The Jewish cemetery in Izbica is being reconstructed by the Foundation for the Preservation of Jewish Heritage in Poland.

== See also ==
- List of Jewish ghettos in German-occupied Poland
