= Włodawa Synagogue =

Former Orthodox synagogue complex in Włodawa, Poland

Włodawa Synagogue (Great Synagogue)
- Polish: Wlodowa Synagoga (Polish: Wielka Synagoga)
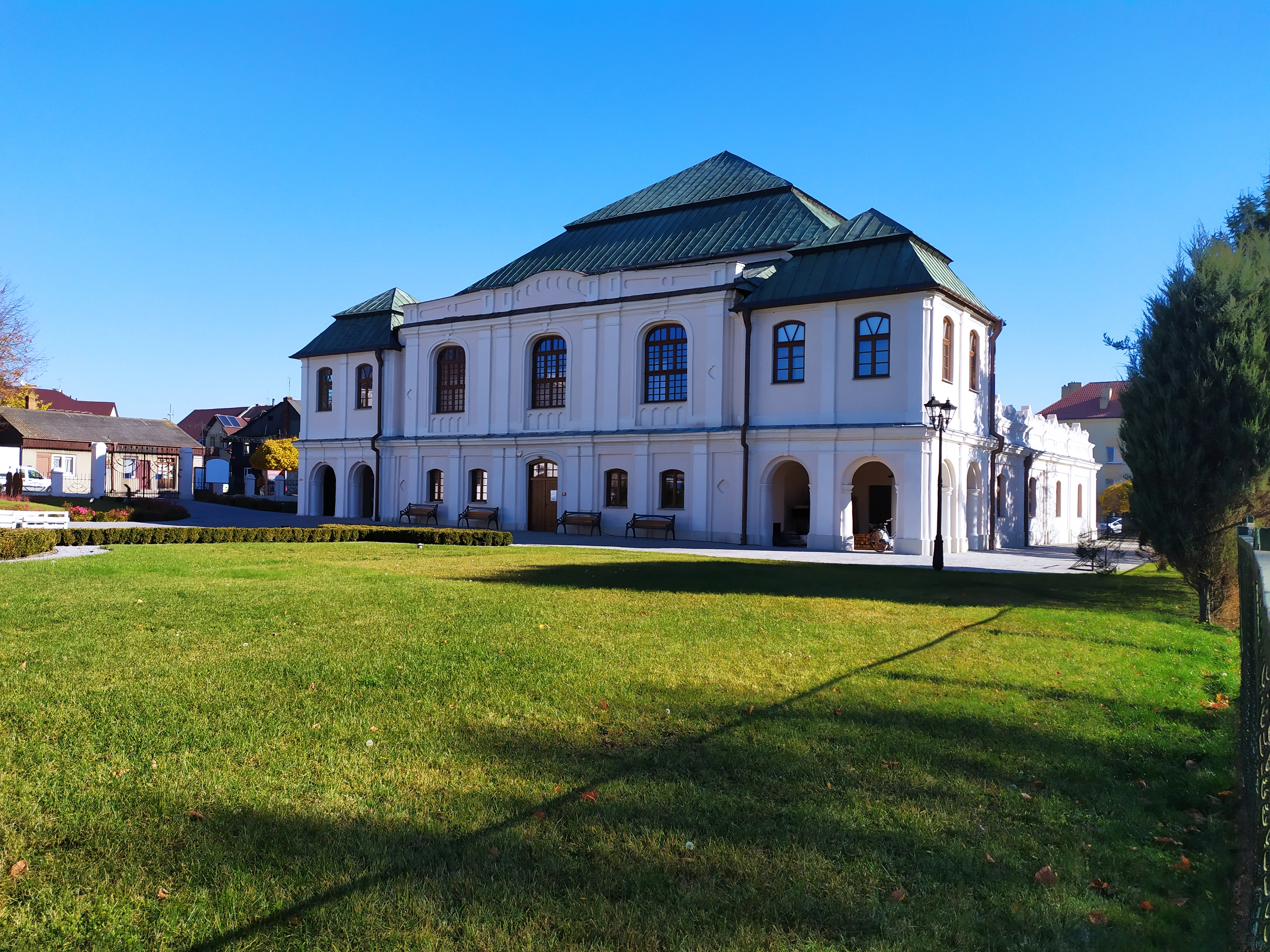
- The former Great Synagogue building in 2021

- Location of the synagogue complex in Lublin Voivodeship

Religion
- Affiliation: Orthodox Judaism (former)
- Rite: Nusach Ashkenaz
- Ecclesiastical or organisational status: Synagogue; Beit midrash; Jewish museum
- Status: Inactive (as a synagogue); Repurposed

Location
- Location: 5-7 Czerwonego Krzyża Street, Włodawa, Lublin Voivodeship
- Country: Poland
- Coordinates: 51°33′01″N 23°33′02″E

Architecture
- Architect: Paolo Antonio Fontana (1774)
- Type: Synagogue architecture
- Style: Baroque (Great and Small)
- Established: 1534 (as a congregation)
- Groundbreaking: 1764 (Great); 1782 (Small)
- Completed: 1774 (Great); 1786 (Small); 1928 (community hall)
- Materials: Brick

The Włodawa Synagogue (Polish: Wlodowa Synagoga) is a former Orthodox Jewish congregation and synagogue complex, located at 5-7 Czerwonego Krzyża Street, in Włodawa, in the Lublin Voivodeship of Poland. The synagogue complex comprises the Włodawa Great Synagogue (Polish: Wielka Synagoga), the Small Synagogue or Beit midrash, and a Jewish administrative building, all now preserved as a Jewish museum.

Designed by Paolo Antonio Fontana in the Baroque style and completed in 1774, the former Great Synagogue is preserved as a Jewish museum. The Small Synagogue, or Beit midrash, also in the Baroque style, was completed in 1786 and is preserved as a museum as well. The administrative community building was completed in 1928. The synagogue complex is "one of the best-preserved" synagogues in Poland.

Jewish immigrants from Włodawa established the Wlodowa Synagogue in London, England in 1901.

== History of the Jewish community ==
The existence of a Jewish community in Włodawa is first recorded in connection with the Lublin fair of 1531. By 1623 Włodawa had a representative in the Council of the Four Lands. The community's prosperity was due to the granting of a city charter in 1534. For much of the early modern period, a time when the Polish-speaking community of the region was predominately engaged in agriculture, Jews appear to have composed much of the population of the city, engaged in all forms of craft production and trade. The community was devastated by the Chmielnicki massacres of 1648, but afterwards was re-established and rebuilt. By 1765 the town had 630 Jews. In 1693, the town had 197 dwellings, 89 of which were owned by Jewish families. The census of 1773 records Jewish physicians, butchers, millers, barbers, goldsmiths, tailors, furriers, merchants, and carters, in addition to one Jew in each of the trades of coppersmith, cobbler, glazier, chandler, and wheelwright. There were also 8 Jewish schoolmasters, 2 educators, a cantor, a bass player and a cymbal player. There were 2,236 Jews in 1827 and 6,706 in 1907.

In the late nineteenth century Włodawa had a Jewish-owned steam-powered flour mill, tannery and soap factory. Of the 184 stores in the town, 177 were owned by Jews. Wlodawa's first Zionist organization was formed in 1898, the town also had Bund, Agudath Israel and Poalei Zion organizations. There was a Beis Yaakov school for girls.

As of 2024, there are no Jews known to be living in Włodawa.

== Complex overview ==
The synagogue complex is unusual not only because it escaped destruction by the Nazi occupiers of Poland, and because the entire suite of Jewish communal buildings is intact, but also because, unlike many other former synagogues in Poland that were destroyed, left to decay, or turned to other uses in the Communist era, it was meticulously restored.

=== Great Synagogue ===
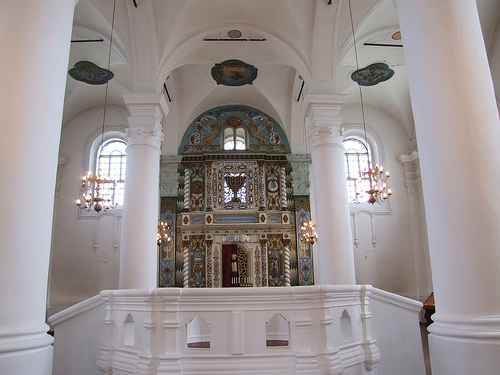
Bimah and vaulting of the Great Synagogue

The Great Synagogue was built between 1764 and 1774 to replace a wooden synagogue that was completed in 1684. The Great synagogue is a Baroque structure, with a ground floor entrance and a high-ceilinged, second-story sanctuary. The flanking wings give the building a general configuration similar to the palaces and great manor houses of the Polish nobility of the era. The wings held women's prayer rooms. Also unusual is the three-tiered copper roof that takes the general form of the unique wooden synagogues of the Polish-Lithuanian commonwealth. The first official inventory of important buildings in Poland, A General View of the Nature of Ancient Monuments in the Kingdom of Poland, led by Kazimierz Stronczynski in 1844–55, describes the Great Synagogue of Włodawa as one of Poland's architecturally notable buildings.

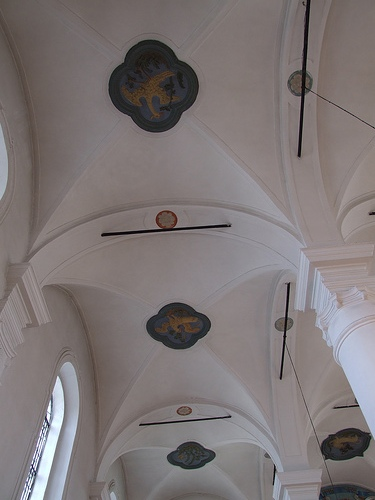
Bird and animal rosettes

The original one-story building was expanded in the nineteenth century. The present building is cross-vaulted with lunettes and nine fields. It is supported by four weight-bearing columns, which surround but do not form part of the bimah. The bimah is a 1936 reproduction of the bimah lost in a fire in 1934. The masonry columns survived the fire.

The walls and ceilings are molded and painted, and bear both Jewish and Polish motifs. One of the ceiling rosette paintings features the stork, a highly popular symbol of Poland, and the central of the nine ceiling rosettes, in the place of honor over the bimah, is an eagle, which is both a symbol of both Poland and Israel.

==== Torah Ark ====
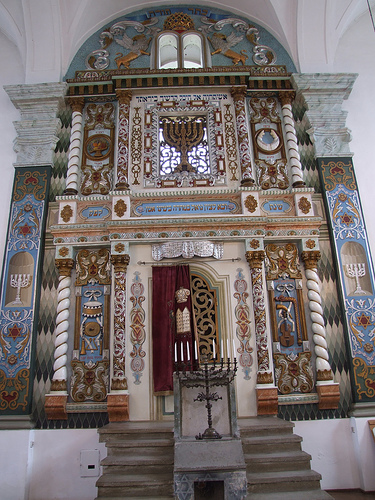
Torah Ark

The Torah Ark is particularly fine. It is a 2004 restoration of the Torah Ark built in 1936, itself reproducing from old photographs the wooden Torah Ark lost to fire in 1934. It is noted for the fine carvings, including carvings of musical instruments, that commemorate the Temple of Solomon. The Ark is three stories high, with windows on the second and third stories. Elaborate carved arks of this kind were not unusual in Polish synagogues; the Wlodawa Ark was regarded as a particularly fine example, but it is unusual mostly because it survives.

At the top of the ark, two Griffins support window openings in the form of symbolic tablets of the Covenant, above this is a "Crown of the Torah", shaped like a royal crown. The carving of the tablets as a window through which the light of the Torah shines is unusual. Below it is another window, a carved image of a Menorah with carved, scrolling openwork surmounted by a quotation from Psalm 5:8: "And in thy fear will I worship toward thy holy Temple." This is surrounded by symbolic references to the ancient Temple service. At the right, priestly hands are carved in a gesture of blessing, on the left there is a basket of fruit representing the Temple offerings. At the first floor level, on both sides of the recess for the scrolls, there are carved musical instruments of which the congregation was particularly proud. These allude to the service of the Levites in the Temple and the quotation from Psalm 150:3-4-5: "Praise him with the sounding of the trumpet, praise him with the harp and lyre, praise him with tambourine and dancing, praise him with the strings and flute, praise him with the clash of cymbals..." The instruments depicted, however, are not ancient in form, but, rather, a distinctly eighteenth-century European style drum, violin, and horn alongside a shofar. There are four Solomonic columns, in the tortile shape believed to have been used in the Temple of Solomon. On the frieze there is a sign in the middle of which the date the new Aron ha-kodesh was built is encrypted: 5696 according to the Jewish calendar, 1936.

During the Nazi occupation of Poland, both synagogues were used as German military storehouses. They became museums in 1983, and restoration work continued through till 1998.

=== Small Synagogue ===
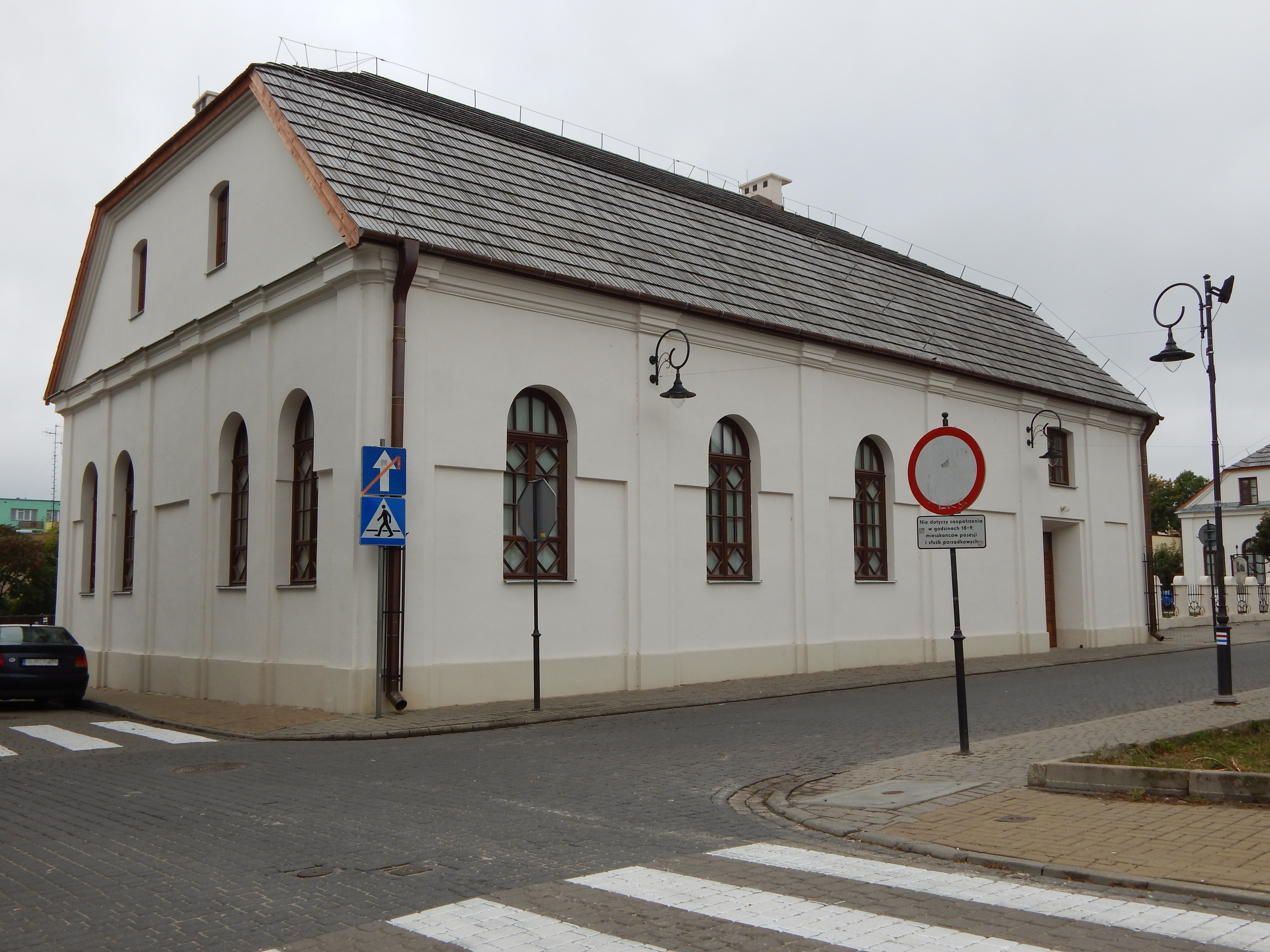
Small Synagogue

The Small Synagogue or Beit Medrash, was built between 1782 and 1786 is a well-built, 2 1/2-story, hip-roofed building. It has a women's prayer room above the vestibule. The windows were replaced and some alterations made after the devastation of World War I. The building bears a plaque commemorating these repairs. The elaborate, polychrome folk paintings on the synagogue walls are reproduced from surviving plaster fragments and old photographs.

In the post-World War II era the Small Synagogue was used as a garage. In the 1980s it stood as a roofless ruin. The building has been repurposed as the Museum of Łęczna and Włodawa Lake District for use as an office and for storage.

=== Kahal office building ===
The third building in the complex is the Kahal, an administrative building of the Wlodawa Jewish community, built in 1928. It was in continuous use, but was renovated after 1979 and is now the administrative building of the museum. All three buildings hold exhibition rooms that have been used to display both Jewish and non-Jewish exhibits.

== See also ==
- Chronology of Jewish Polish history
- History of the Jews in Poland
- List of active synagogues in Poland
