= Włodawka =

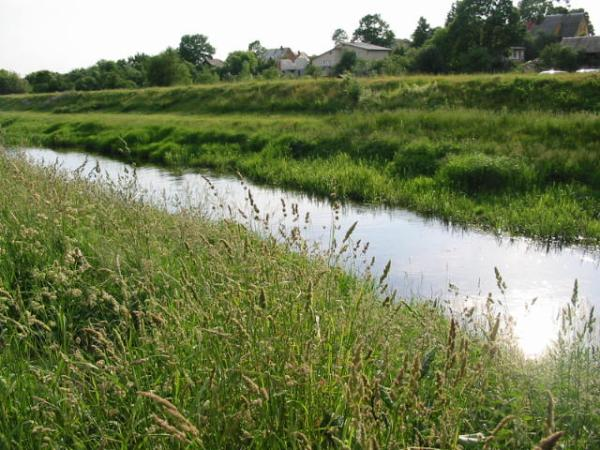
- Włodawka at Włodawa

Location
- Country: Poland

Physical characteristics
- Mouth
  - location: Bug
  - coordinates: 51°32′57″N 23°33′51″E

Basin features
- Progression: Bug→ Narew→ Vistula→ Baltic Sea

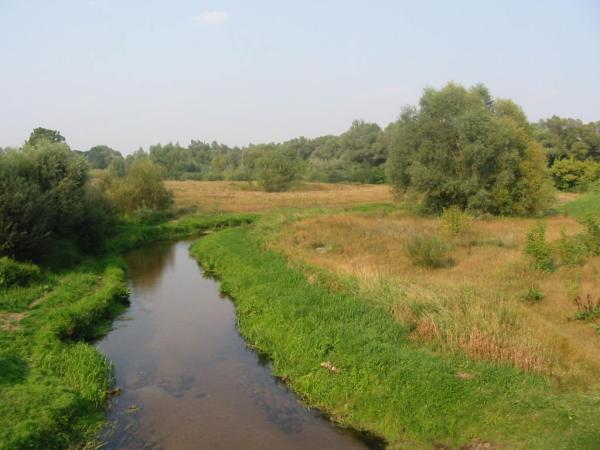
Włodawka in Włodawa

The Włodawka is a river, located in eastern Poland, Lublin voivodeship, Włodawa county, passing by the town of Włodawa. The 38,4 km long Włodawka flows into the Bug River.
