= Włodawa =

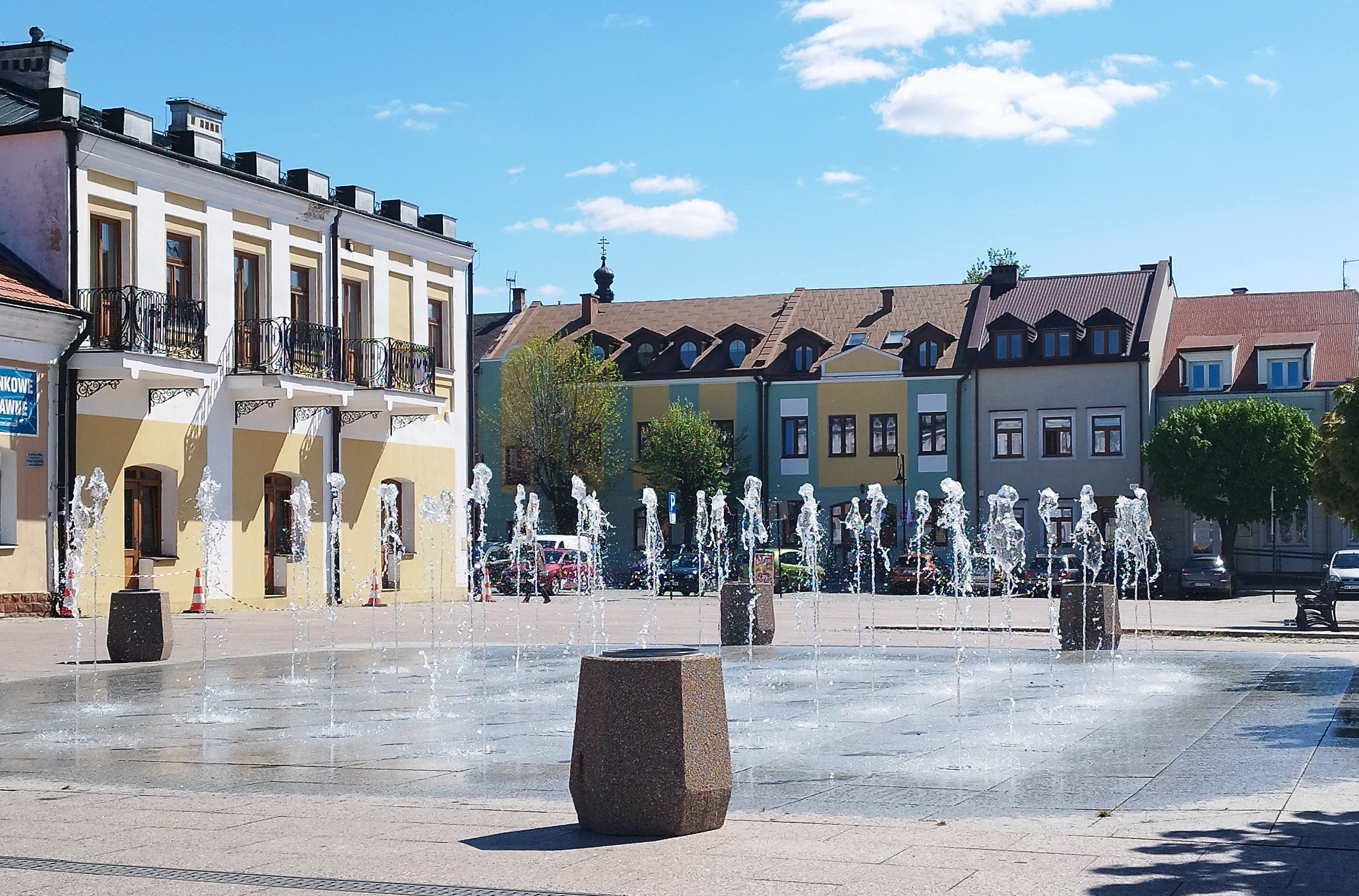
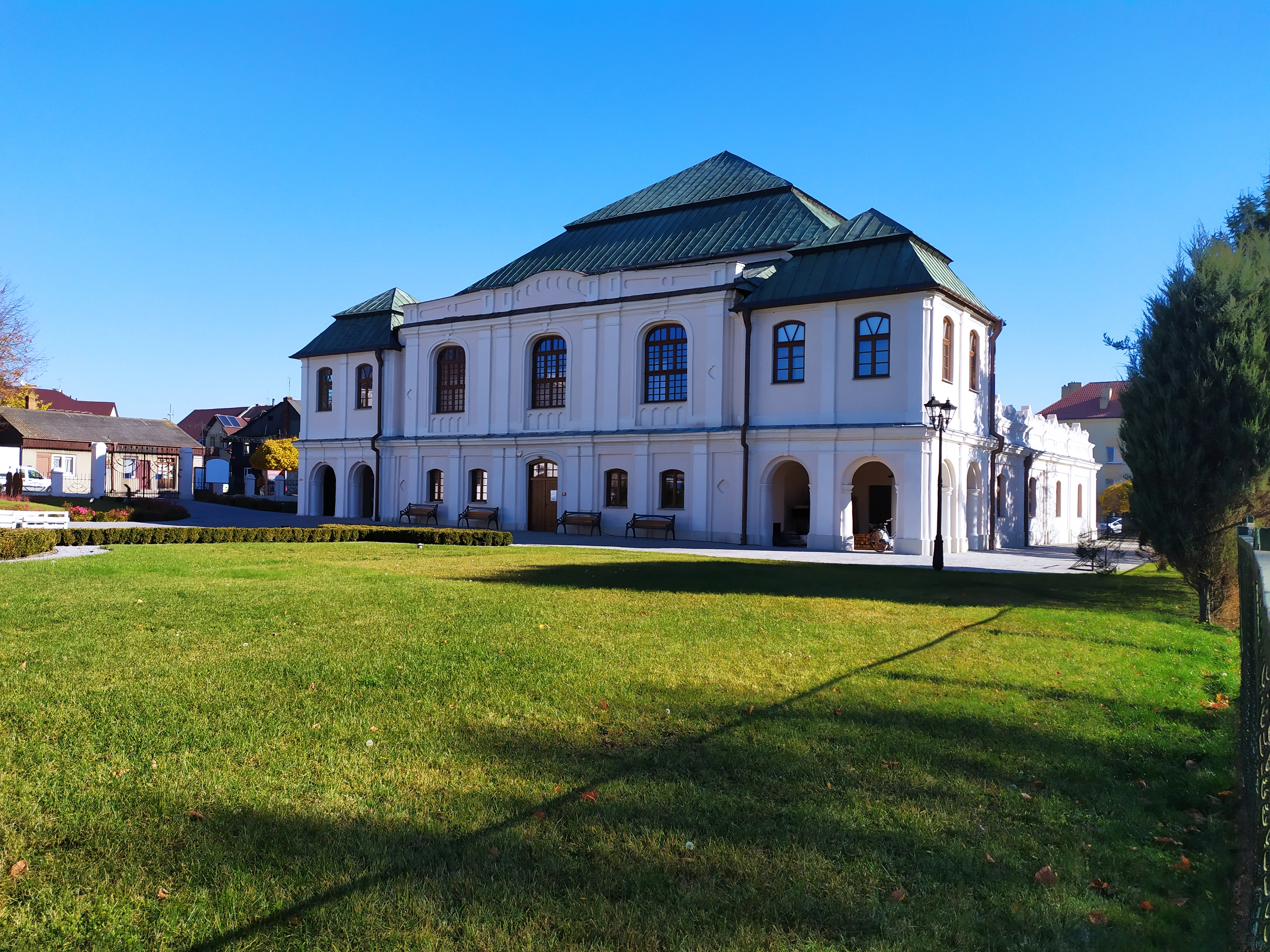
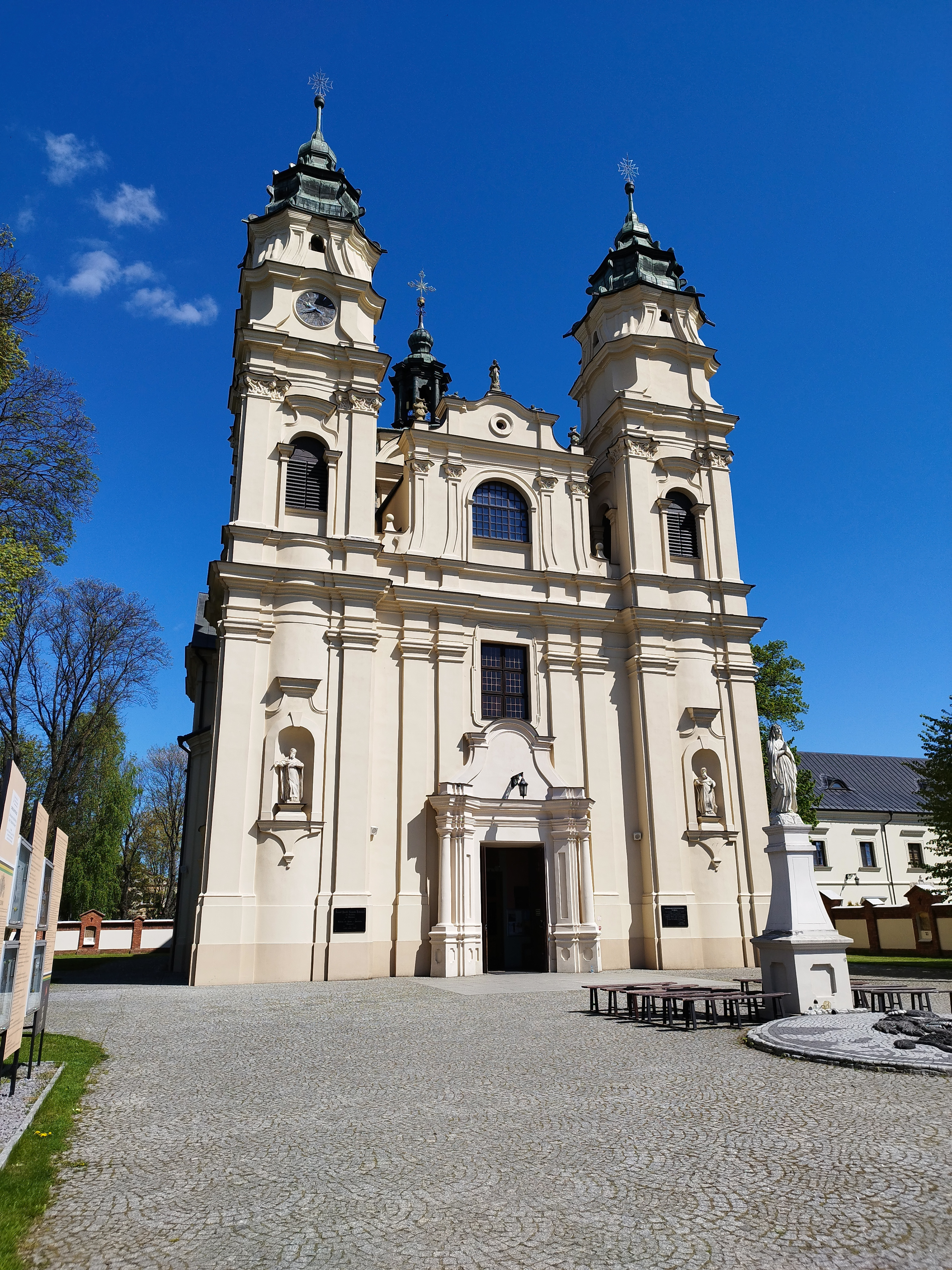
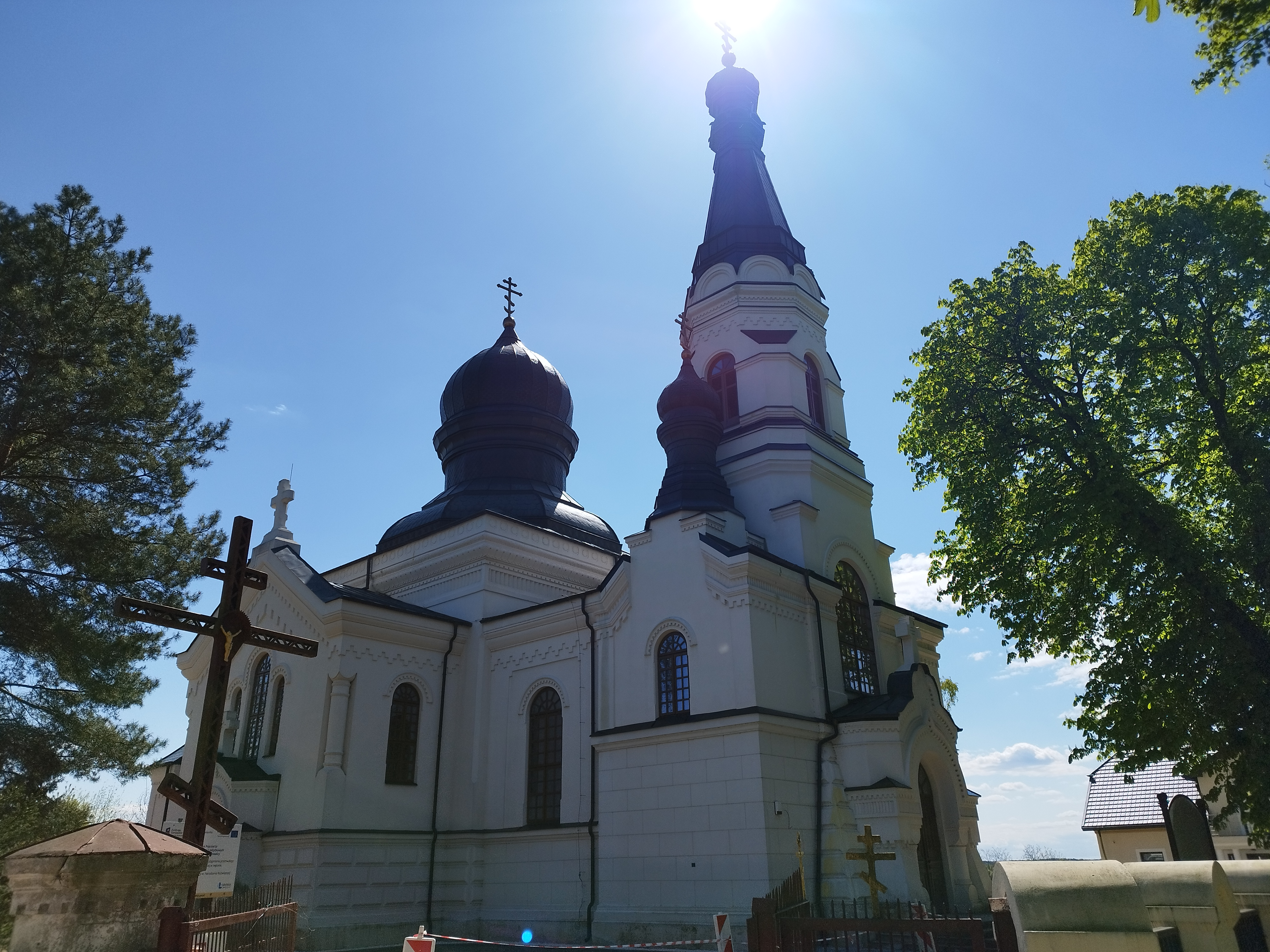
- Czworobok Great Synagogue St. Louis Church Orthodox Church in Włodawa

- Flag Coat of arms
- Interactive map of Włodawa
- Location within Poland
- Coordinates: 51°33′N 23°33′E
- Country: Poland
- Voivodeship: Lublin
- Powiat: Włodawa
- Gmina: Włodawa (urban gmina)
- First mentioned: 1242
- Town rights: 1534

Government
  - Mayor: Wiesław Muszyński (L)

Area
  - Total: 17.97 km^{2} (6.94 sq mi)

Population (31.12.2023)
  - Total: 12,123
  - Density: 674.6/km^{2} (1,747/sq mi)
- Time zone: UTC+1 (CET)
  - Summer (DST): UTC+2 (CEST)
- Postal code: 22-200
- Postal code: 22-200
- Car plates: LWL
- Website: Official website

Włodawa (Polish pronunciation: [vwɔˈdava]) is a town in eastern Poland, situated on the Bug River and on the border with Belarus and Ukraine. It is the seat of Włodawa County, within the Lublin Voivodeship. As of 2016 it has a population of 13,500.

== Geography ==
The town lies along the borders of Poland with both, westernmost Belarus and Ukraine, on the banks of the Bug River, 51 kilometres (32 miles) from Chełm in Poland and Brest in Belarus; 64 kilometres (40 miles) from Terespol, 86 kilometres (53 miles) from Lublin, and 77 kilometres (48 miles) from Liuboml in the Volyn Oblast of Ukraine. It is close to the Belarusian southernmost strip of the Brest Raion within the Brest Region bordering with north-western Ukraine.

== History ==
Historical population
Year	Pop.	±%
1921	6,263	—
1931	8,519	+36.0%
1939	9,293	+9.1%
2010	13,402	+44.2%

Włodawa was first mentioned in historical records in 1242. The first written mention of the town in an Old Slavonic chronicle which speaks about Prince Daniel staying there, escaping from the Tartars in 1241. In 1446–1447 the surrounding territories were annexed into the Grand Duchy of Lithuania and the river Włodawka marked the border between the Duchy and the Polish Crown within the Polish–Lithuanian Union. In 1475 Michał and Aleksander Sanguszko received the town in exchange with the Polish King Casimir IV Jagiellon. For the next 100 years the town became the home for the Sanguszko family. They built their castle here and developed the town's prosperity. The Sanguszko profited from the border crossing which was bringing good income. In 1534 the town received city rights, confirmed in 1540. At that time the influx of the Jewish population started, which promoted commerce and crafts. The location on the large river, Bug, favored the rapid development of the city as a commercial and transit center.

By the end of the 16th century, Włodawa passed into the hands of Andrzej Leszczyński and from that time belonged to the Leszczyński family for next generations. As Leszczyński was a Calvinist, Włodawa soon became an important center of Protestantism. In 1624 a Calvinist church and a school were built here. Between 1633 and 1648, the minister of the Calvinist congregation in Włodawa was Polish historian and poet Andrzej Węgierski. In 1634 a Calvinist synod was held in Włodawa, which was attended by delegates from the entire Polish–Lithuanian Commonwealth. Protestants from Bohemia, Moravia and Silesia also settled in Włodawa at that time.

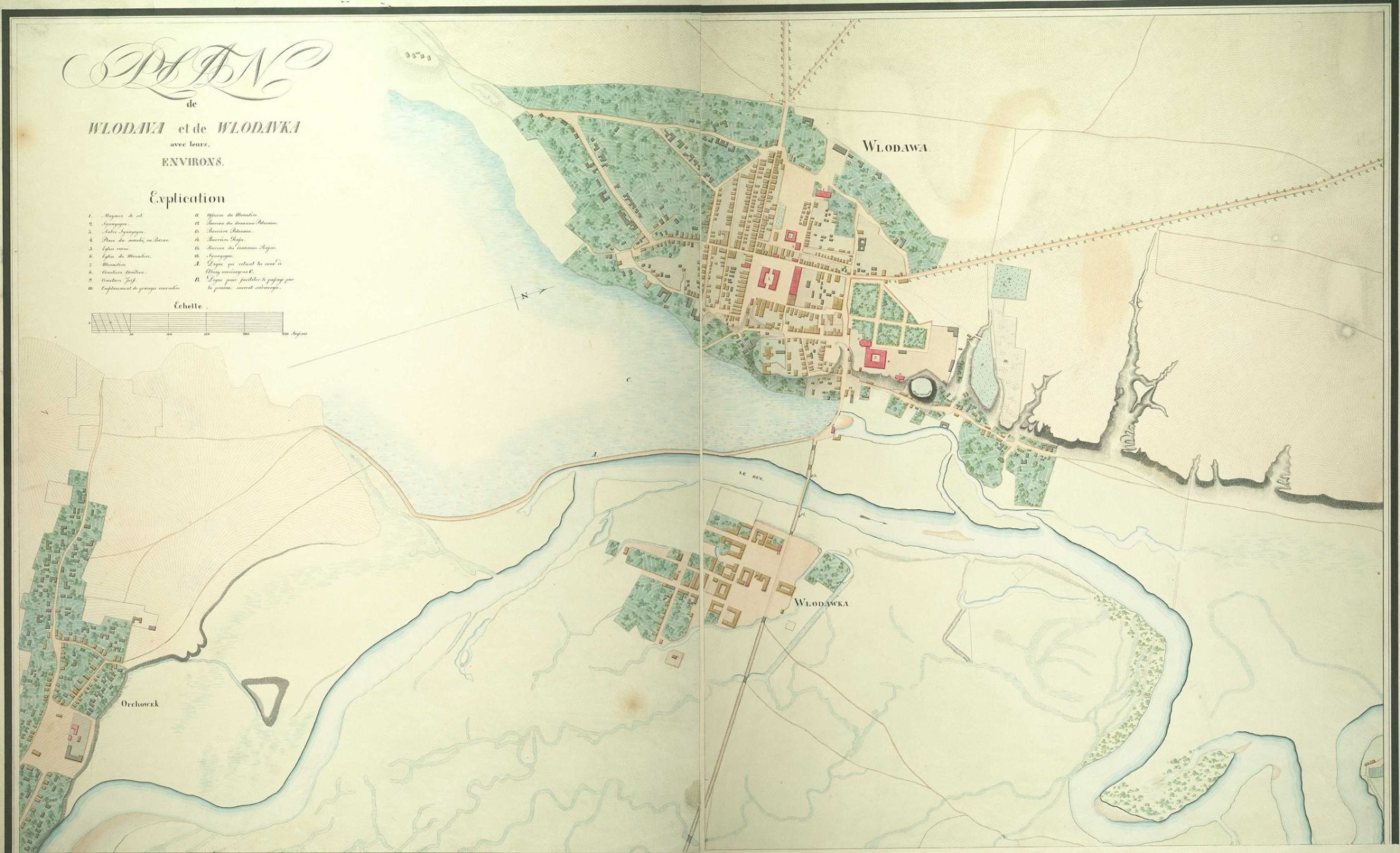
Włodawa map from 1825.

In 1648, the Cossack-Tatar army plundered and destroyed the city, killing almost the entire population, including all Jews. In 1657 the city was devastated again, this time by the Swedes during the Deluge. John III Sobieski and the subsequent Polish kings granted the right to four annual fairs. Horses and, above all, oxen from nearby Volhynia were sold at these fairs, with the latter being even sold to Kraków, Poznań, Berlin and Vienna. These fairs, as well as the staple right for salt contributed to Włodawa's wealth. In the 17th century, Rafał Leszczyński, father of the future Polish King Stanisław Leszczyński, became the owner of Włodawa, but due to debts he sold it to Ludwik Pociej. Pociej brought the Paulines from the Jasna Góra Monastery in Częstochowa to Włodawa and built their monastery. In the 18th century, the city was the property of the Pociej, Flemming, Czartoryski and Zamoyski families.

After the Partitions of Poland, Włodawa was annexed by Austria in 1795. Following the Austro-Polish War of 1809, it was regained by Poles and included within the short-lived Duchy of Warsaw. In 1815 it became part of Congress Poland, initially autonomous, but later forcibly integrated within Imperial Russia. The inhabitants of Włodawa actively joined the January Uprising in 1863. After the fall of the uprising, bloody repressions began and the attempts at Russification intensified. During World War I, from 1915 to 1918, the city was occupied by the Germans.

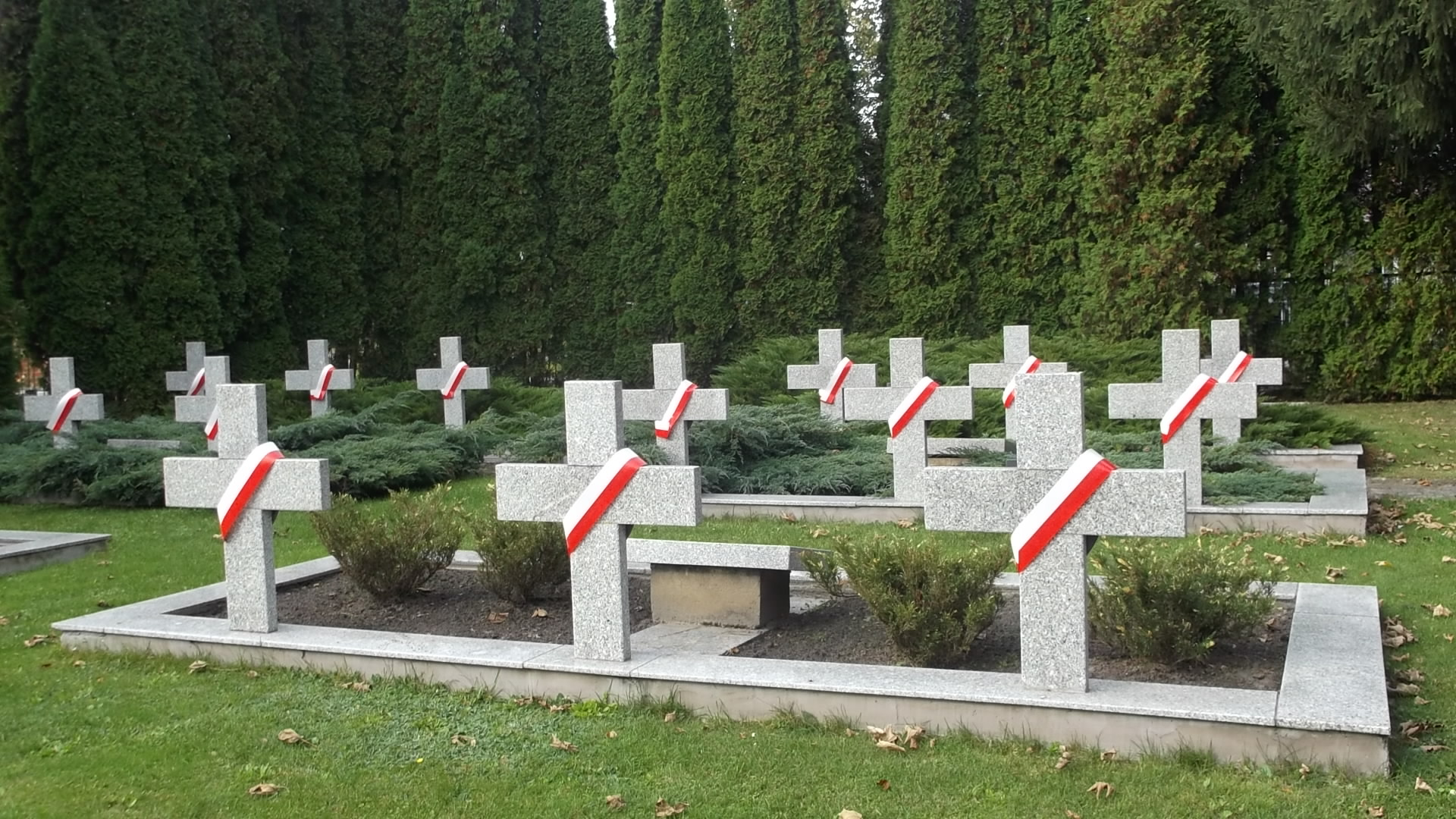
Polish Military Cemetery from World War II

Following Poland's return to independence, Włodawa became a seat of the Włodawa County. During the Polish–Soviet War, it was briefly occupied by the Russians, and then recaptured by the Poles on 17 August 1920. In 1939, before the onset of World War II, the population of Włodawa was 9,293. There was a garrison of heavy artillery regiment and the division of the field artillery in the town, used by the Pomorze and the Modlin armies in the defence of Poland against Nazi Germany and the Soviet Union. Włodawa was bombed by the Luftwaffe on 3 September 1939. Future Polish war hero Witold Pilecki fought against the invaders near Włodawa. Under German occupation, Włodawa was the location of a subcamp of the Stalag 319 prisoner-of-war camp for Allied POWs.

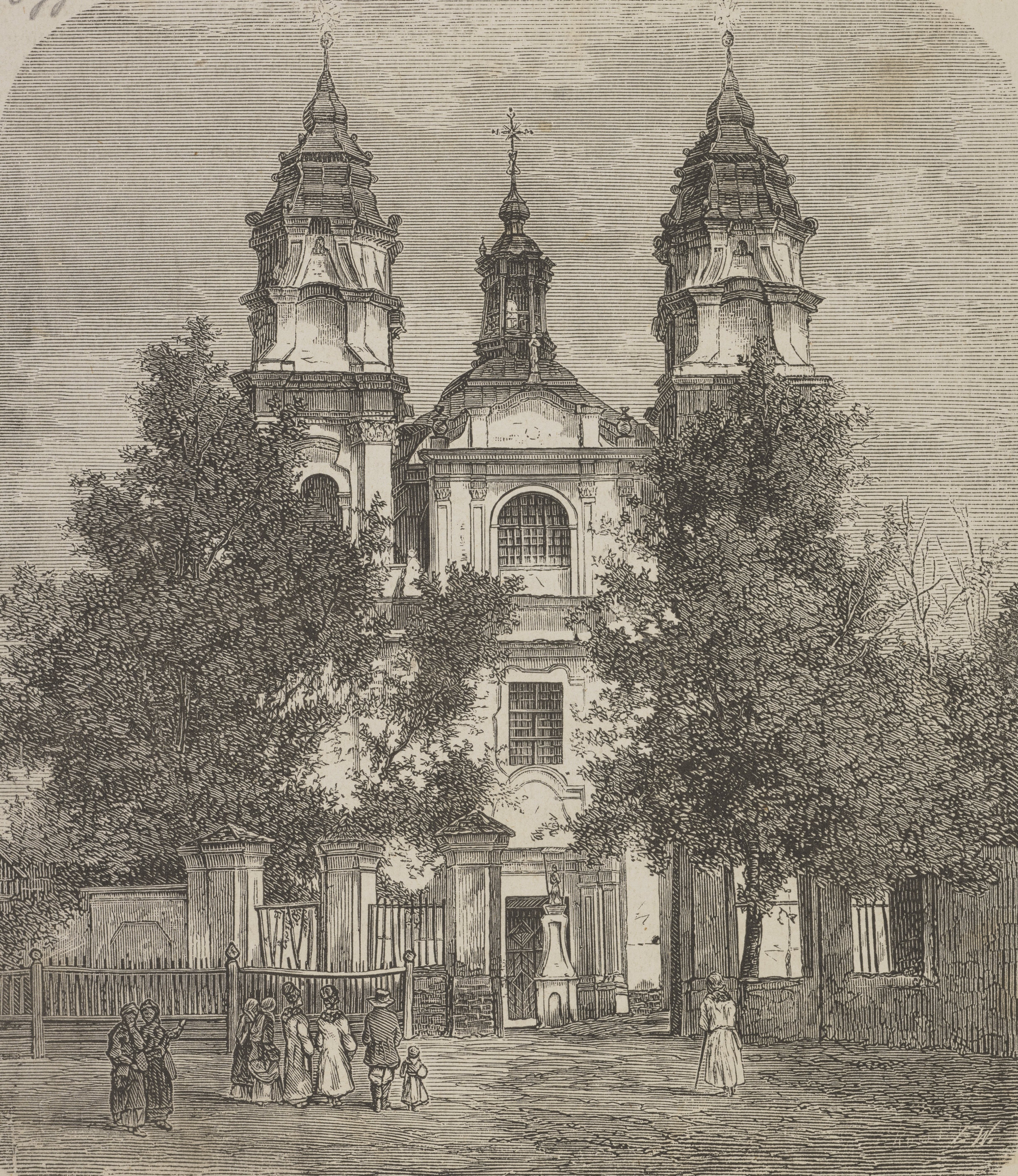
Parish church, 1871

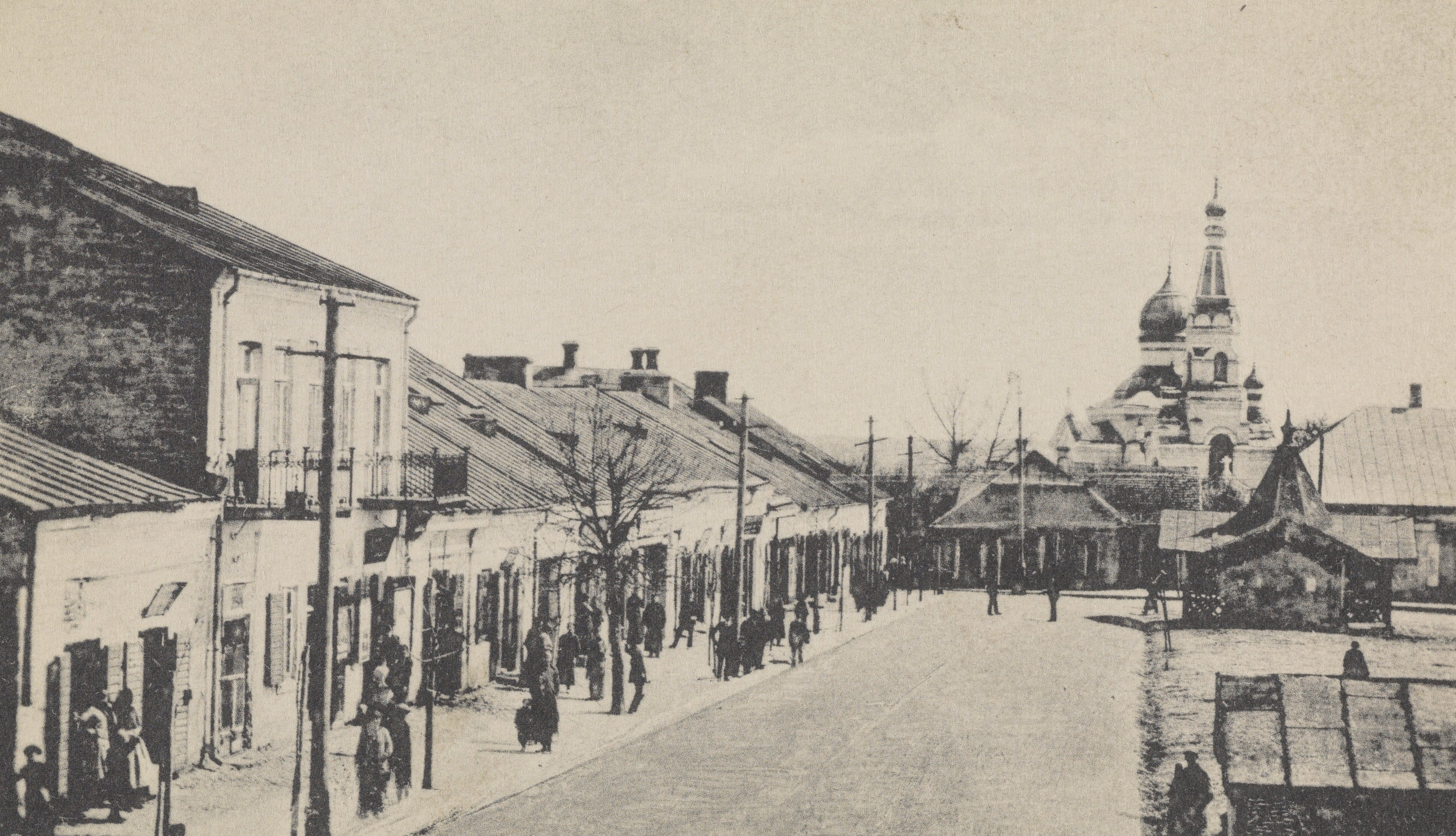
Market square, 1923–1926

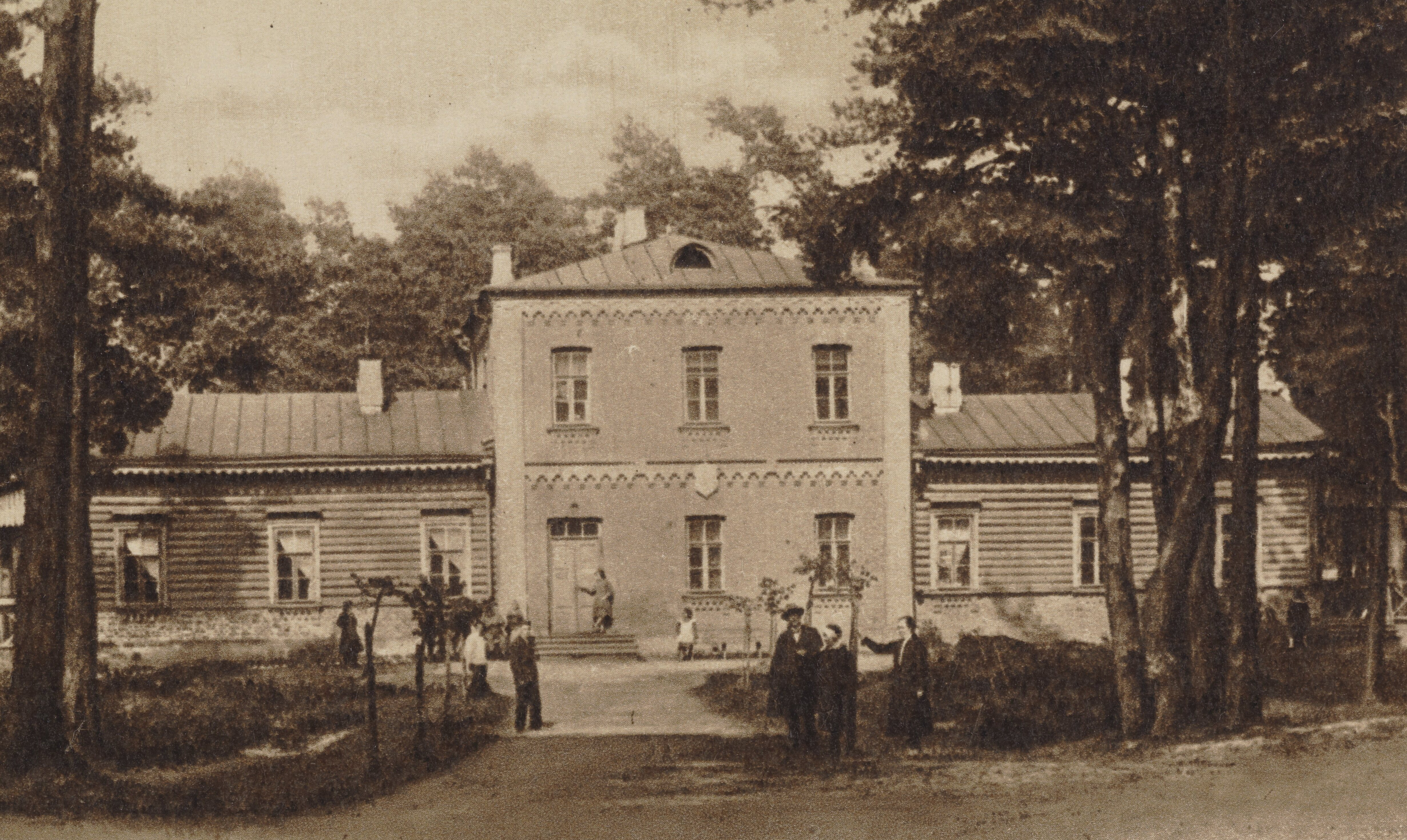
Sanatorium, 1926–1935

=== Ethnic minorities ===
==== Jewish community ====
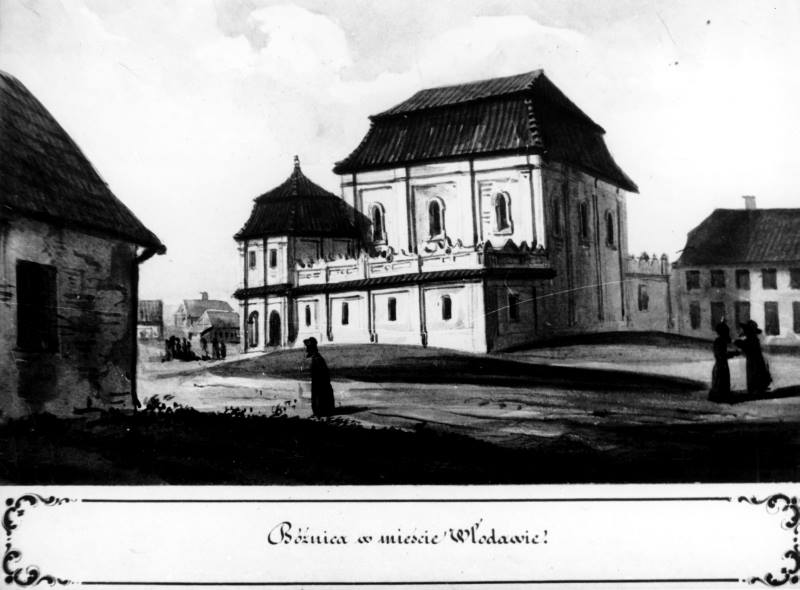
A view of the Great Synagogue dating back to the Polish–Lithuanian Commonwealth

The existence of a Jewish community in Włodawa is first recorded in connection with the Lublin fair of 1531. By 1623 Włodawa had a representative in the Council of the Four Lands. The community's prosperity was due to the granting of a city charter in 1534. For much of the early modern period, a time when the Polish-speaking community of the region was predominately engaged in agriculture, Jews appear to have composed much of the population of the city, engaged in all forms of craft production and trade. The community was devastated by the Chmielnicki massacres of 1648, but afterwards re-established and rebuilt. By 1765 the town had 630 Jews. In 1693, the town had 197 dwellings, 89 owned by Jewish families. The census of 1773 records Jewish physicians, butchers, millers, barbers, goldsmiths, tailors, furriers, merchants, and carters, in addition to one Jew in each of the trades of coppersmith, cobbler, glazier, chandler, and wheelwright. There were also 8 schoolmasters, 2 educators, a cantor, a bass player and a cymbal player. There were 2,236 Jews in 1827 and 6,706 in 1907.

In the late 19th century Włodawa had a Jewish-owned steam-powered flour mill, tannery and soap factory. Of the 184 stores in the town, 177 were owned by Jews. Włodawa's first Zionist organization was formed in 1898, the town also had Bund, Agudath Israel and Poalei Zion organizations. There was a Beis Yaakov school for girls also.

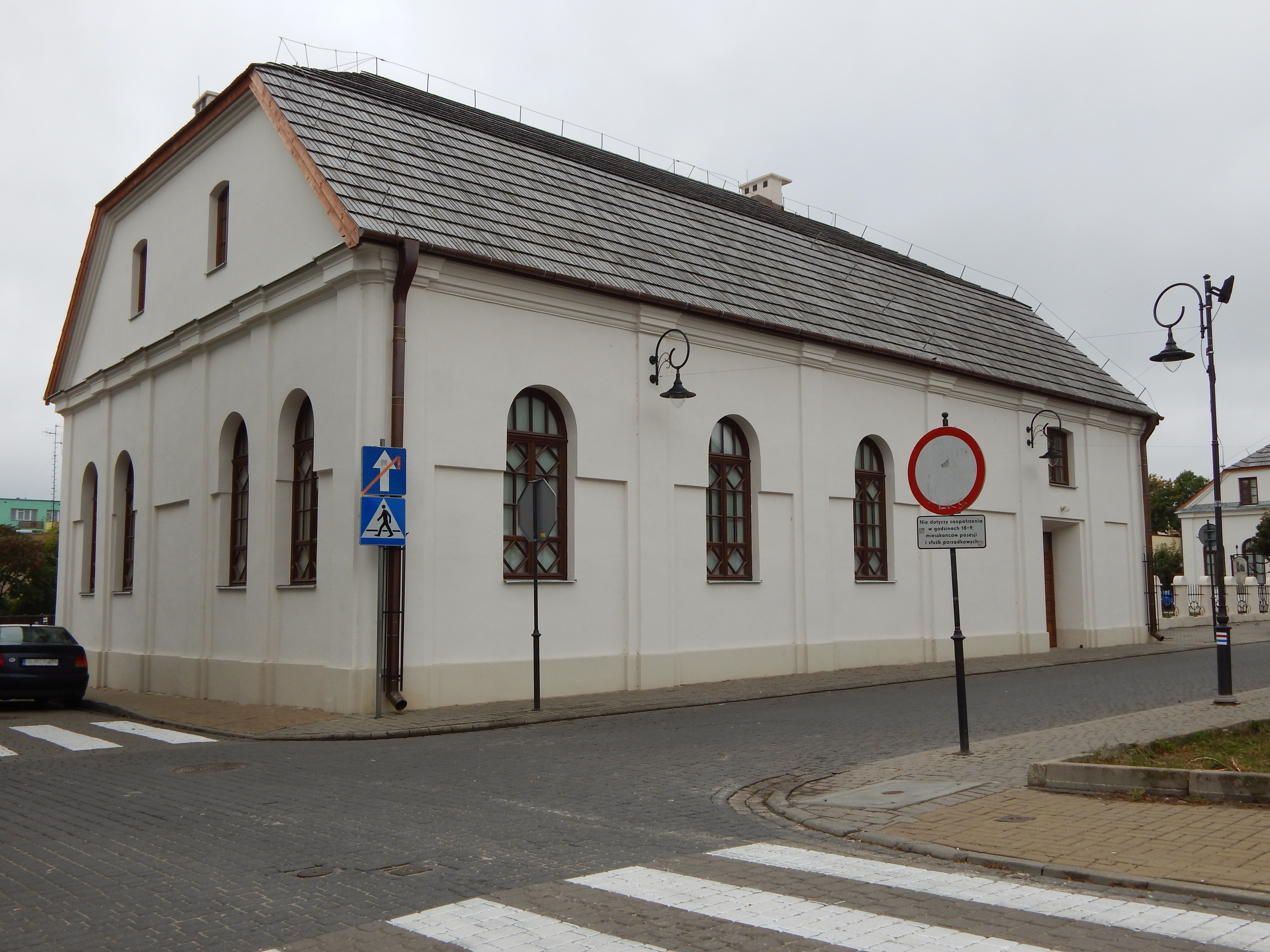
Small Synagogue, 18th century

Włodawa was over 70% Jewish before the Nazi-Soviet invasion of Poland and the Holocaust. The city became part of the Nazi German Lublin District of the General Government following the invasion. Włodawa Ghetto was set up by the German administration in 1941. Jews from all neighbouring locations were sent there. The Ghetto was overcrowded and lacked food and medicine. Starvation and disease were common. Round ups for the Holocaust transports to the nearby Sobibór extermination camp took place in waves: 1,300 Jews in May 1942, 5,400 in October, 2,800 in November 1942, and 2,000 in April 1943, as well as the last 150 in May 1943. In June, all remaining Jewish children under the age of 10 were deported and gassed. During the ghetto liquidation action, at the end of October 1942 hundreds of Jews escaped to the surrounding forests. Włodawa Jews were mostly deported to Sobibór, but some were executed locally at the German Arbeitslager workcamps such as the one at Adampol. Several Jews from Adampol and the Włodawa Ghetto were able to escape, and joined the Parczew partisans in the forests, fighting actively against the Nazis with Soviet assistance and weapons. The Jewish cemetery was demolished by the Germans who used the headstones as road building material, and turned the Synagogue into military storage.

On the road to Włodawa there is a memorial to the Jews from Włodawa who were killed at Adampol. No Jews are known to live in the town today, although the handsome, Baroque, Wlodawa Synagogue serves as major tourist attraction. A Włodawa landsmenschafte (society) was founded in America for survivors and descendants of Włodawa's Jewish Community and has members scattered throughout the US, Canada, Australia, England, Israel and elsewhere. London had a Wlodawa Synagogue (London).

==== Amish and Mennonite communities ====
In the 1700s, while some Amish families traveled west from Germany and Switzerland in their quest for religious freedom to the colony of Pennsylvania, others would venture to Central and Eastern Europe, largely as a part of the Josephine colonization. In 1781, Austrian emperor Joseph II invited German farmers to move to Galicia, after seizing the region (which today lies in southeastern Poland and Western Ukraine) in the First Partition of Poland. Other Amish however settled the vicinity of Włodawa, which was then still part of the Polish–Lithuanian Commonwealth.

Jerold A. Stahly wrote of this community in the vicinity of Włodawa in his work, "Mennonite and Amish Identities Among the Swiss Volhynians in Europe":

In the Lithuanian congregation in Urszulin and Michelsdorf in the Włodawa district, one preacher was Christian Graber, ordained in 1790 in Montbeliard to go to Poland. Christian Stucky of Alsace served there as and elder from the 1790s to the 1830s. Graber, Stucky, and Johann Flickinger signed the Essingen agreement for this group. When Austria took control of the Włodawa district in 1795 as part of West Galicia, there was no longer an international border separating the Amish Mennonites in Lemberger and Littauer congregations. The Amish all apparently left Falkenstein and Einsiedel in the next few years. Joseph Mündlein apparently moved to the Włodawa District, where he served as an elder, performing a marriage in 1802. It was in 1804, during these years of Austrian rule that Josef Rohrer wrote about the Mennonites of West and East Galicia. He wrote that they preferred to be called Täufer. He said that one group of Mennonites was stricter and was called Heftler, because they used hooks and eyes on their clothes rather than buttons, like the other group, the Knöfler. He wrote that the strict ones wore bears. He described wives being very careful to avoid a friendly laugh or looking other men in the eye, for fear of being put under a ban for many weeks, so that no Mennonite would speak to her and her husband could not even sit at a table with her.

== Climate ==
Włodawa has an oceanic climate (Köppen climate classification: Cfb) using the −3 °C (27 °F) isotherm or a humid continental climate (Köppen climate classification: Dfb) using the 0 °C (32 °F) isotherm.

Climate data for Włodawa (1991–2020 normals, extremes 1951–present)
Month	Jan	Feb	Mar	Apr	May	Jun	Jul	Aug	Sep	Oct	Nov	Dec	Year
Record high °C (°F)	11.7 (53.1)	16.3 (61.3)	22.3 (72.1)	29.9 (85.8)	32.1 (89.8)	34.2 (93.6)	37.3 (99.1)	36.2 (97.2)	34.5 (94.1)	27.1 (80.8)	19.3 (66.7)	14.9 (58.8)	37.3 (99.1)
Mean daily maximum °C (°F)	0.0 (32.0)	1.6 (34.9)	6.7 (44.1)	14.1 (57.4)	19.6 (67.3)	22.9 (73.2)	25.2 (77.4)	24.8 (76.6)	19.0 (66.2)	12.6 (54.7)	6.1 (43.0)	1.3 (34.3)	12.8 (55.0)
Daily mean °C (°F)	−2.5 (27.5)	−1.4 (29.5)	2.4 (36.3)	8.7 (47.7)	13.9 (57.0)	17.3 (63.1)	19.3 (66.7)	18.6 (65.5)	13.5 (56.3)	8.1 (46.6)	3.2 (37.8)	−1.0 (30.2)	8.3 (46.9)
Mean daily minimum °C (°F)	−5.1 (22.8)	−4.3 (24.3)	−1.4 (29.5)	3.4 (38.1)	8.2 (46.8)	11.6 (52.9)	13.6 (56.5)	12.8 (55.0)	8.6 (47.5)	4.3 (39.7)	0.7 (33.3)	−3.4 (25.9)	4.1 (39.4)
Record low °C (°F)	−34.2 (−29.6)	−30.4 (−22.7)	−23.2 (−9.8)	−7.4 (18.7)	−3.3 (26.1)	−0.7 (30.7)	4.6 (40.3)	1.7 (35.1)	−3.4 (25.9)	−9.0 (15.8)	−19.9 (−3.8)	−26.3 (−15.3)	−34.2 (−29.6)
Average precipitation mm (inches)	27.4 (1.08)	24.8 (0.98)	31.6 (1.24)	37.4 (1.47)	67.3 (2.65)	69.8 (2.75)	82.9 (3.26)	65.1 (2.56)	51.6 (2.03)	40.4 (1.59)	32.2 (1.27)	31.9 (1.26)	562.4 (22.14)
Average extreme snow depth cm (inches)	6.5 (2.6)	7.4 (2.9)	5.8 (2.3)	1.6 (0.6)	0.0 (0.0)	0.0 (0.0)	0.0 (0.0)	0.0 (0.0)	0.0 (0.0)	0.6 (0.2)	3.9 (1.5)	5.1 (2.0)	7.4 (2.9)
Average precipitation days (≥ 0.1 mm)	15.50	14.51	14.27	11.50	13.87	12.67	12.73	10.37	11.27	12.47	14.00	16.03	159.17
Average snowy days (≥ 0 cm)	17.8	17.0	8.9	1.2	0.0	0.0	0.0	0.0	0.0	0.4	5.1	13.8	64.2
Average relative humidity (%)	87.3	84.5	77.9	70.4	71.7	72.9	72.9	73.0	80.1	84.2	88.8	89.0	78.9
Mean monthly sunshine hours	48.2	65.3	126.1	184.7	248.9	265.0	264.7	256.2	161.3	115.4	53.3	36.3	1,825.4
Source 1: Institute of Meteorology and Water Management
Source 2: Meteomodel.pl (records, relative humidity 1991–2020)

== Sport ==
The town is represented by the local football club MLKS Włodawianka Włodawa who compete in the lower leagues.

== Points of interest ==
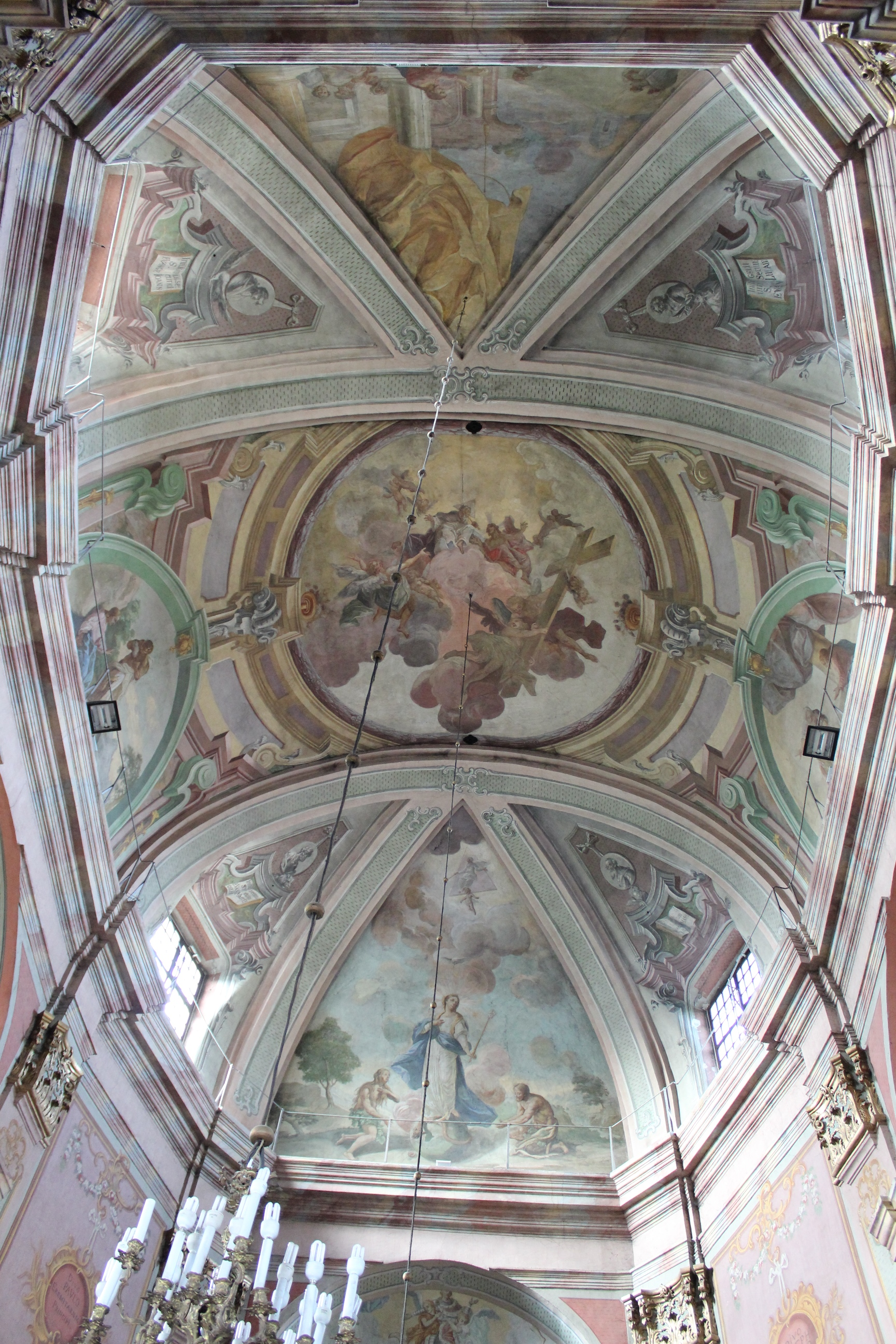
Saint Louis church in Włodawa, paintings of ceiling of the nave by Gabriel Sławiński (pl), 1784–1785

There are several monuments and tourist attractions worth seeing in Włodawa:

- Saint Louis church and baroque monastery, founded by Pauline Monks in the 18th century. The interior is decorated by illusionistic monumental paintings (1784–1785) created mainly by painter Gabriel Sławiński.
- Czworobok and town market, built in the 18th century in the shape of a rectangle. It was used by merchants to sell their goods.
- Wlodawa Synagogue of 1764, that is currently used to host exhibitions about Włodawa Jews as well as local folklore.
- Russian Orthodox church, erected in 1840–1843 and rebuilt in Russian Revival style in 1893 and is used by local Polish Autocephalous Orthodox Church community.
- Włodawa Synagogues Museum (Polish: Muzeum Zespół Synagogalny), managing the Sobibór Museum nearby until April 2011.
- Water measurement on the Bug river.
- Old town with 19th century tenements.
- Promenade next to Włodawka river.
- Władysław Kuraszkiewicz roundabout.
- Sybiraków square, built in memory of Poles sent to Siberia.

== Gallery ==
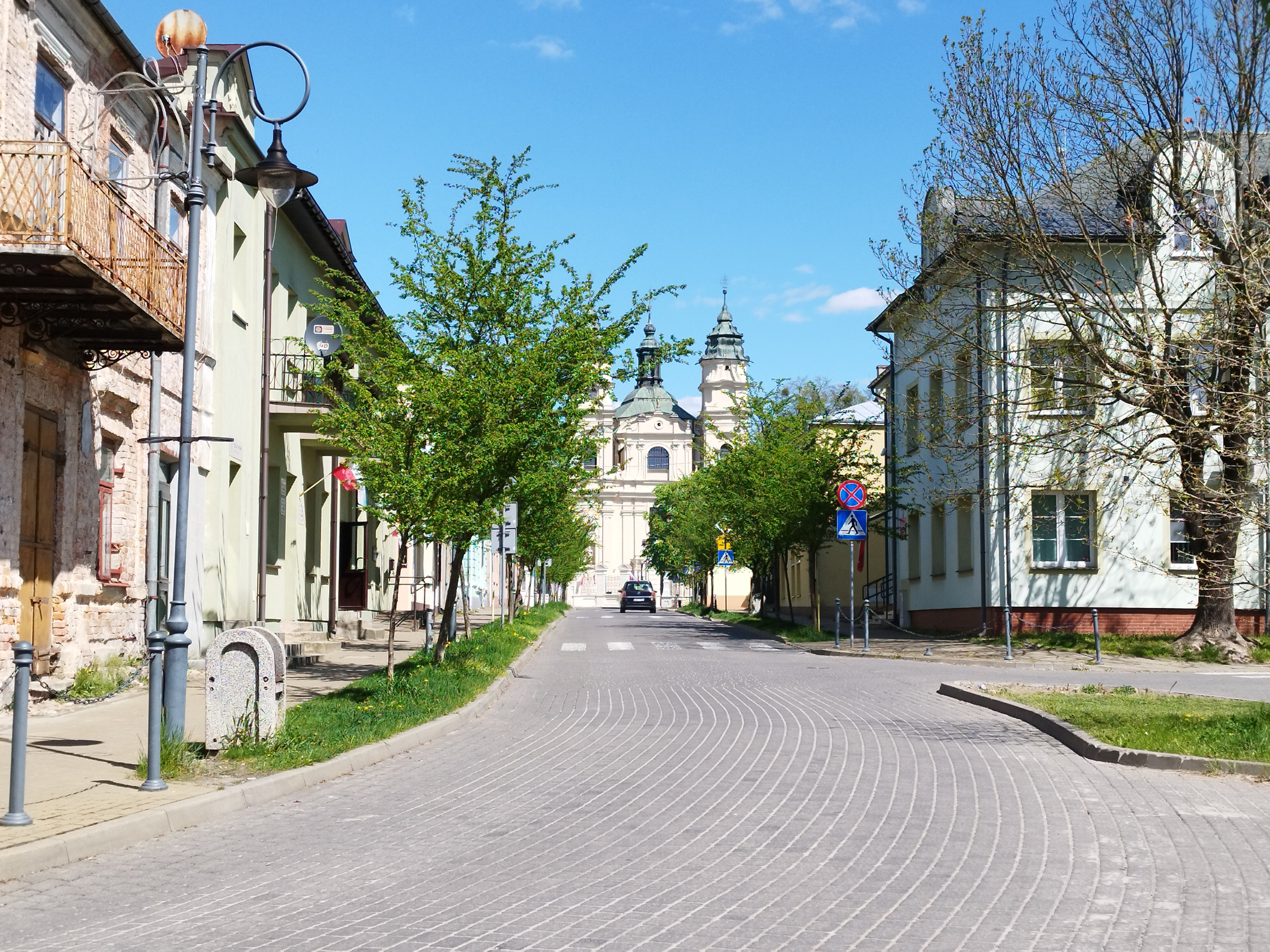
Kościelna street

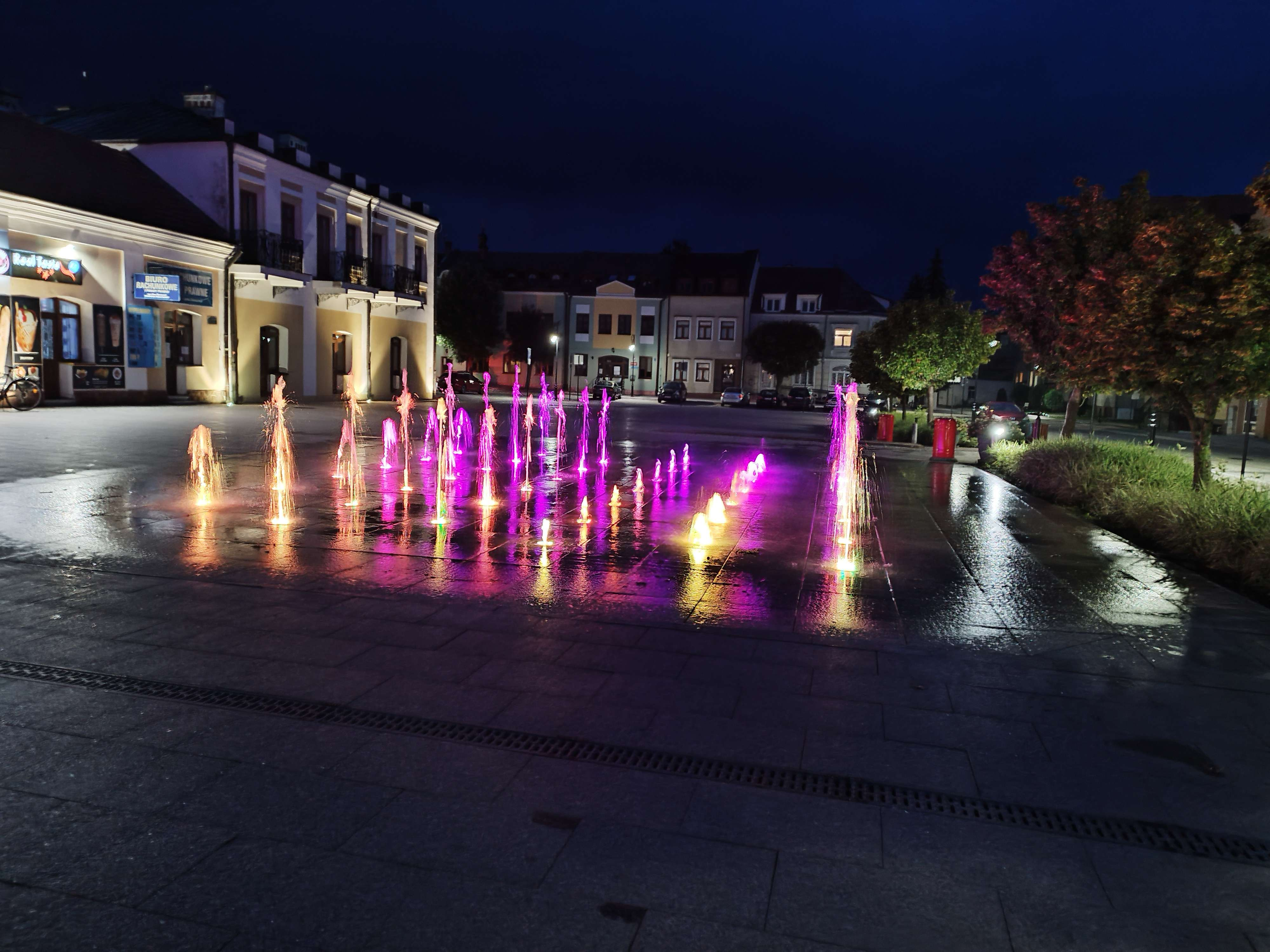
Czworobok and town market during night.

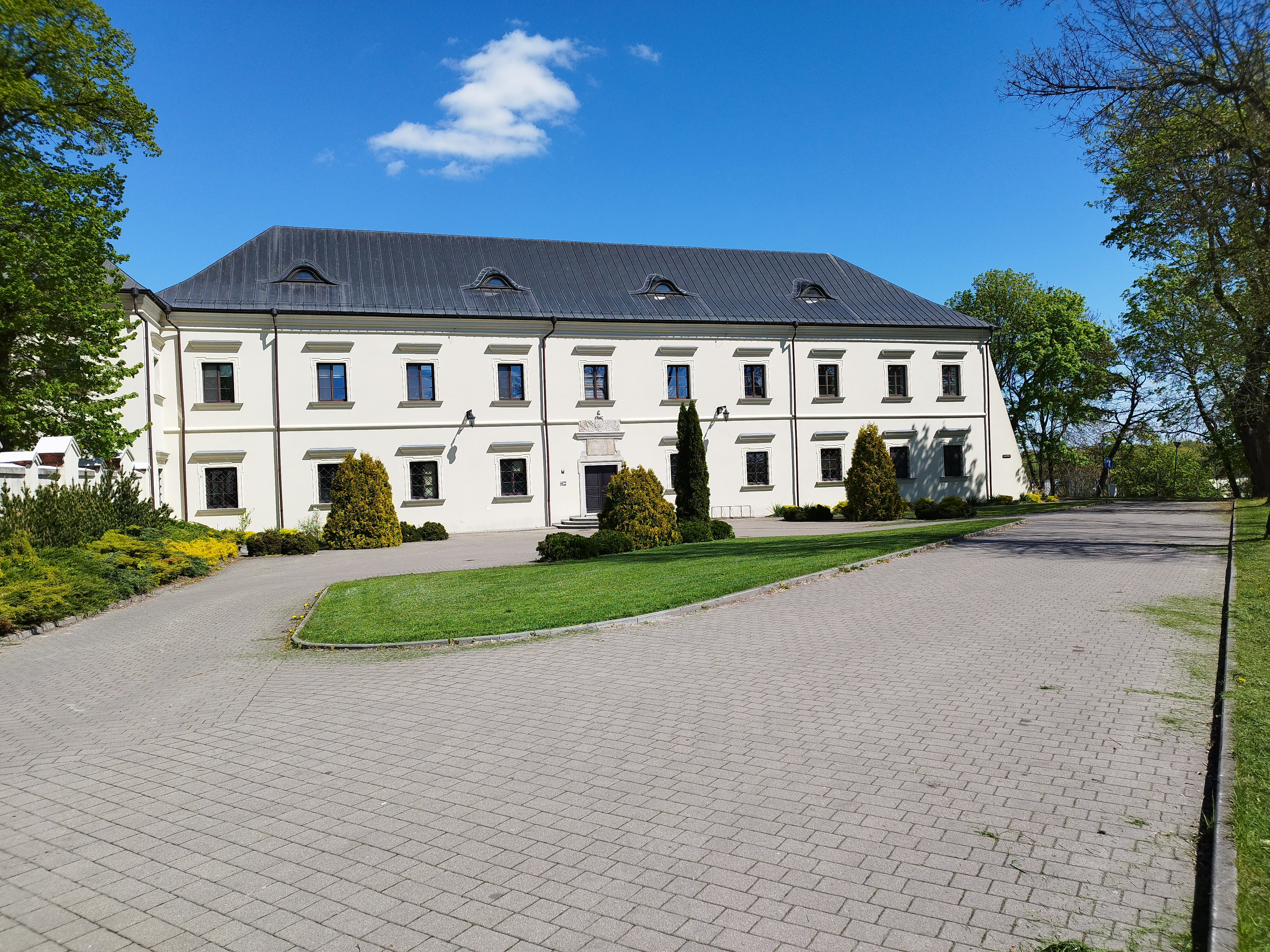
Pauline monastery

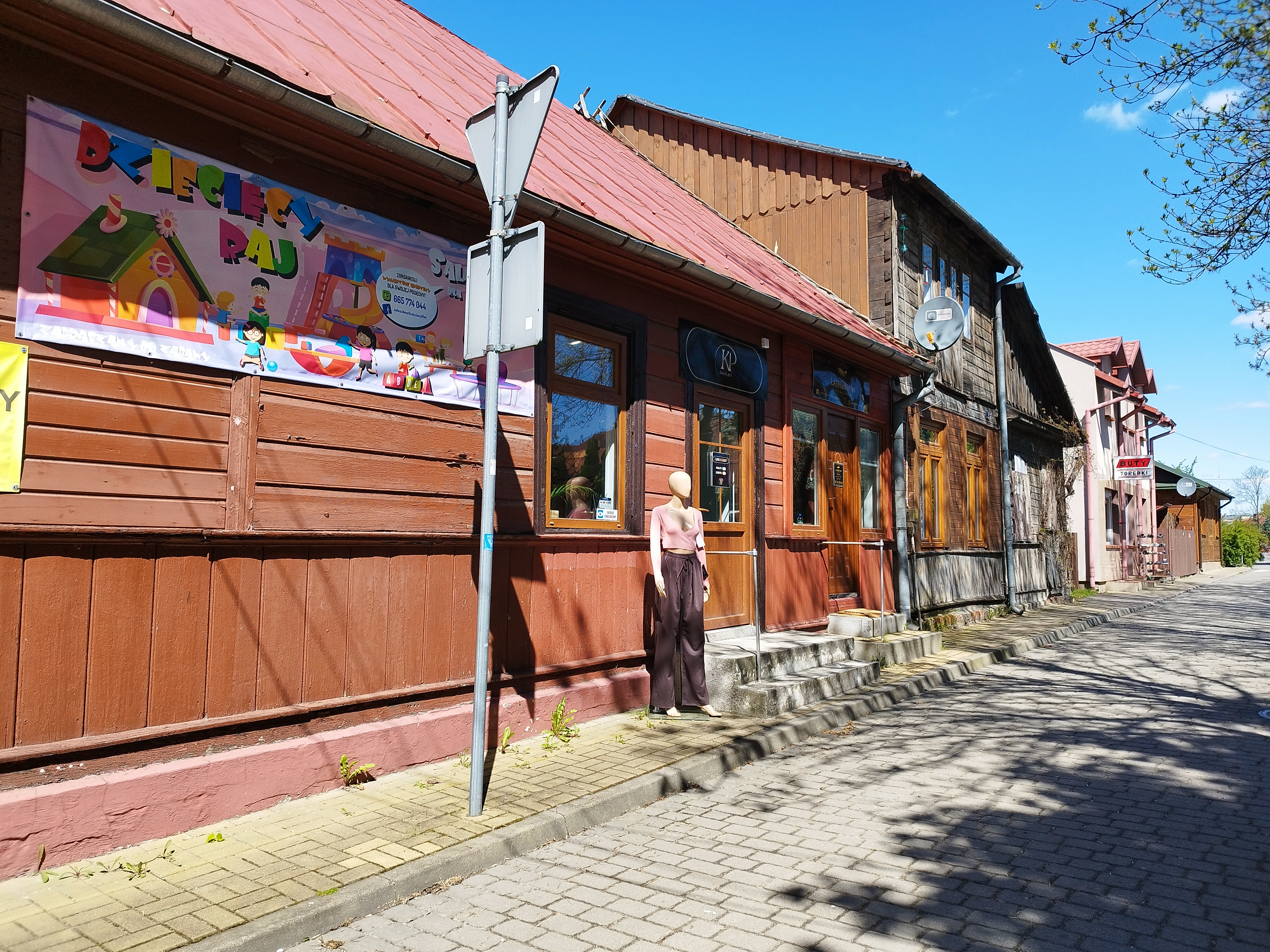
Prewar buildings at Krótka street.

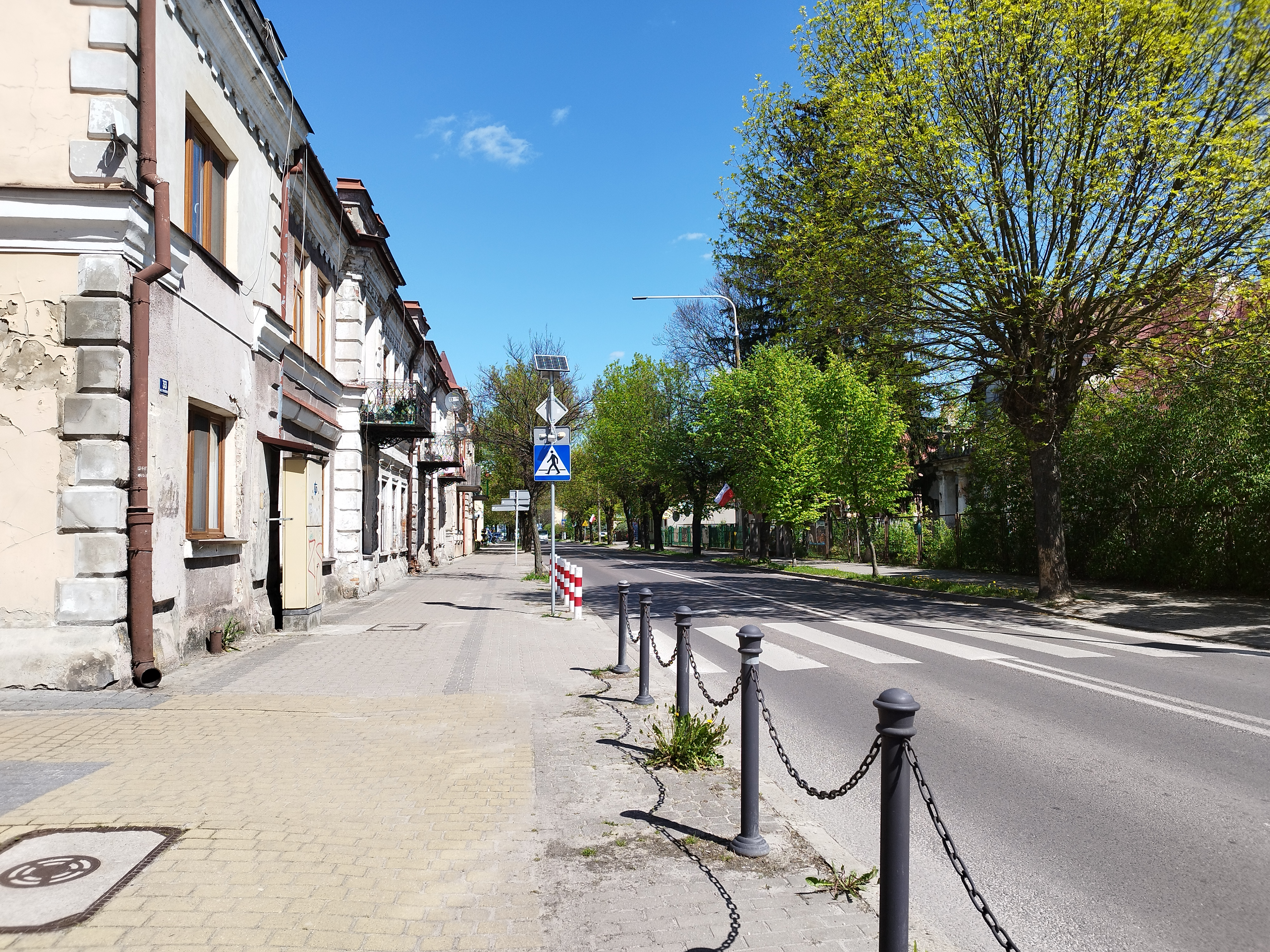
Piłsudskiego street

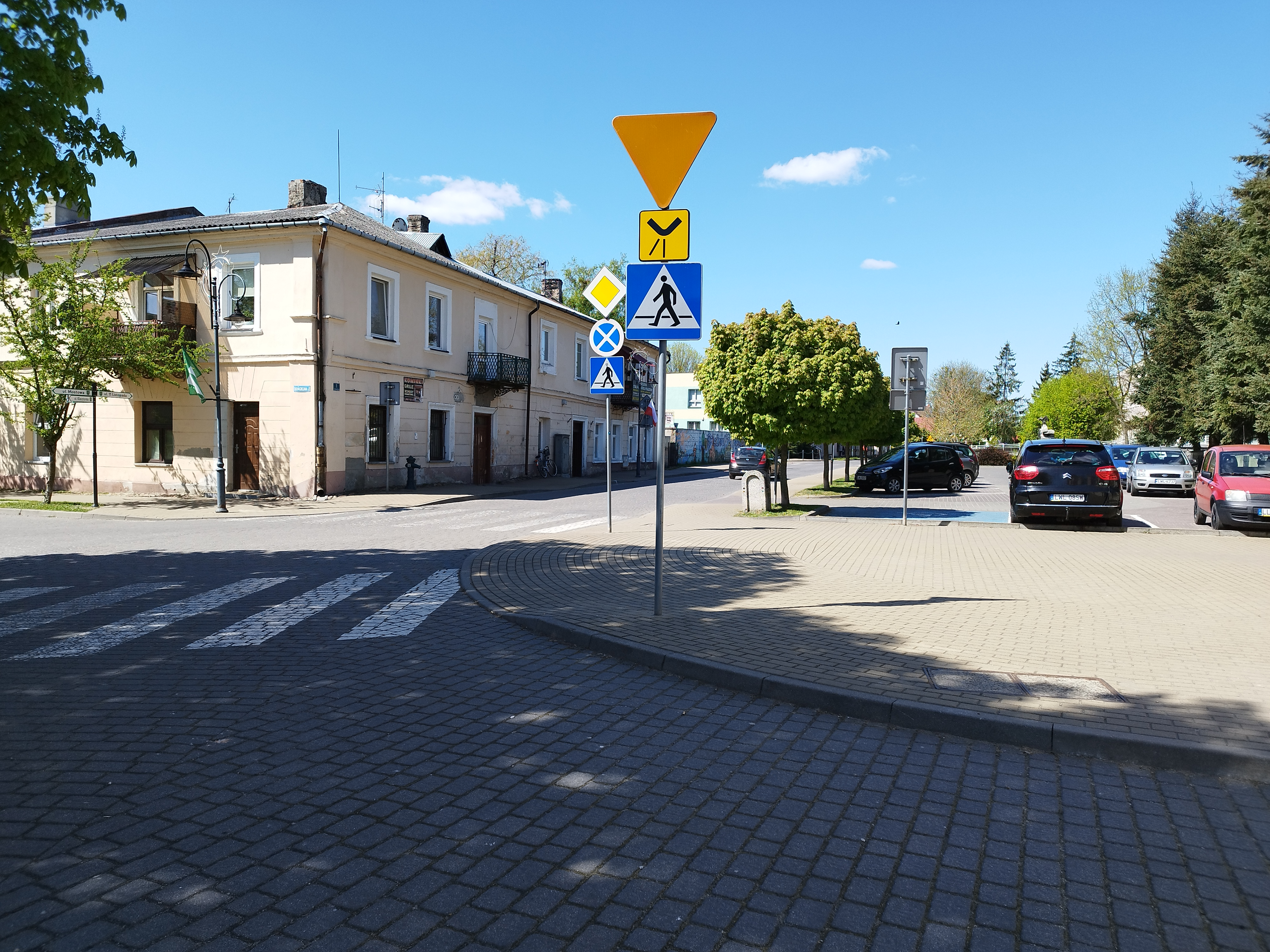
11 Listopada street.

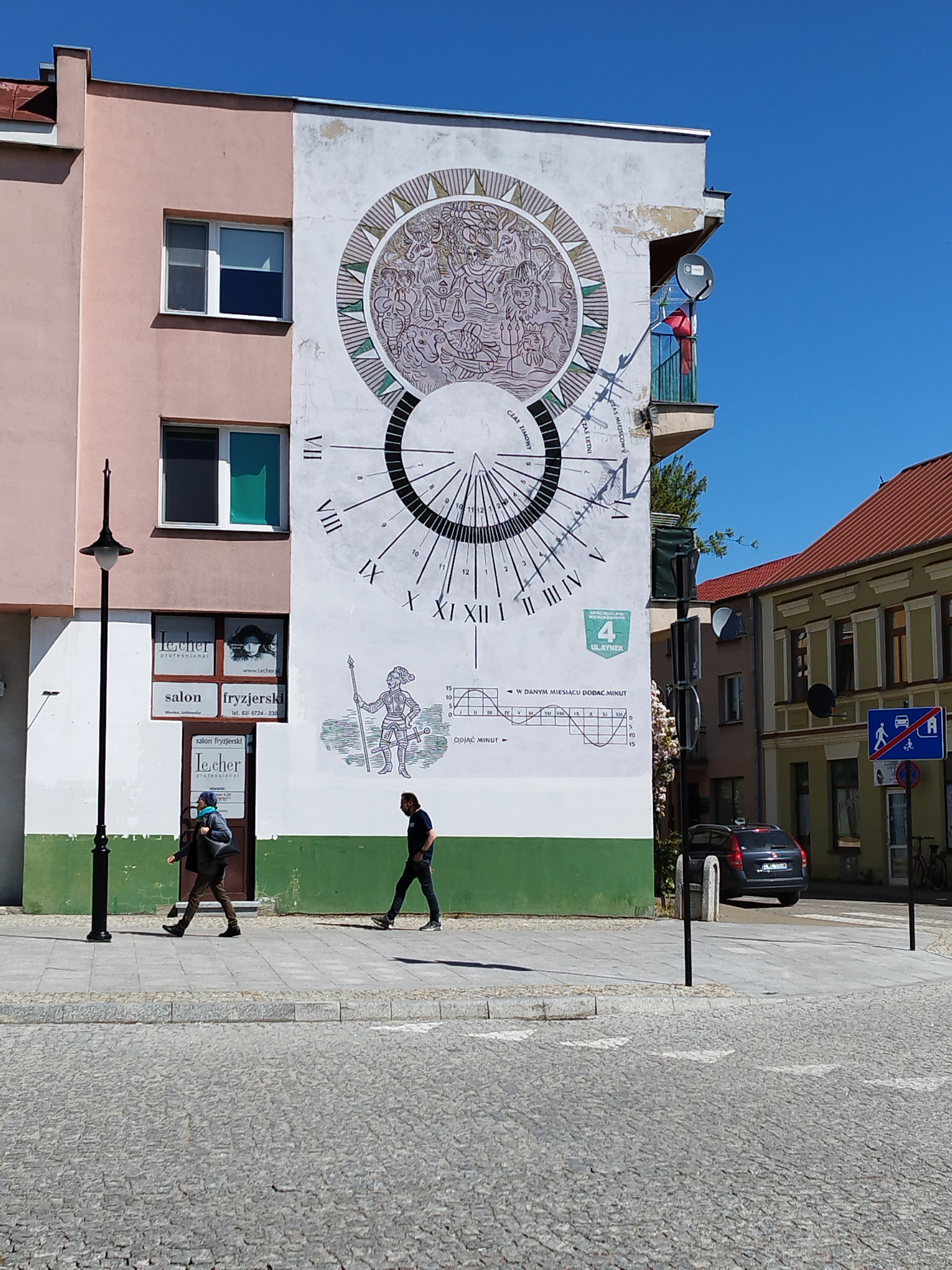
Sun clock on the Town Market.

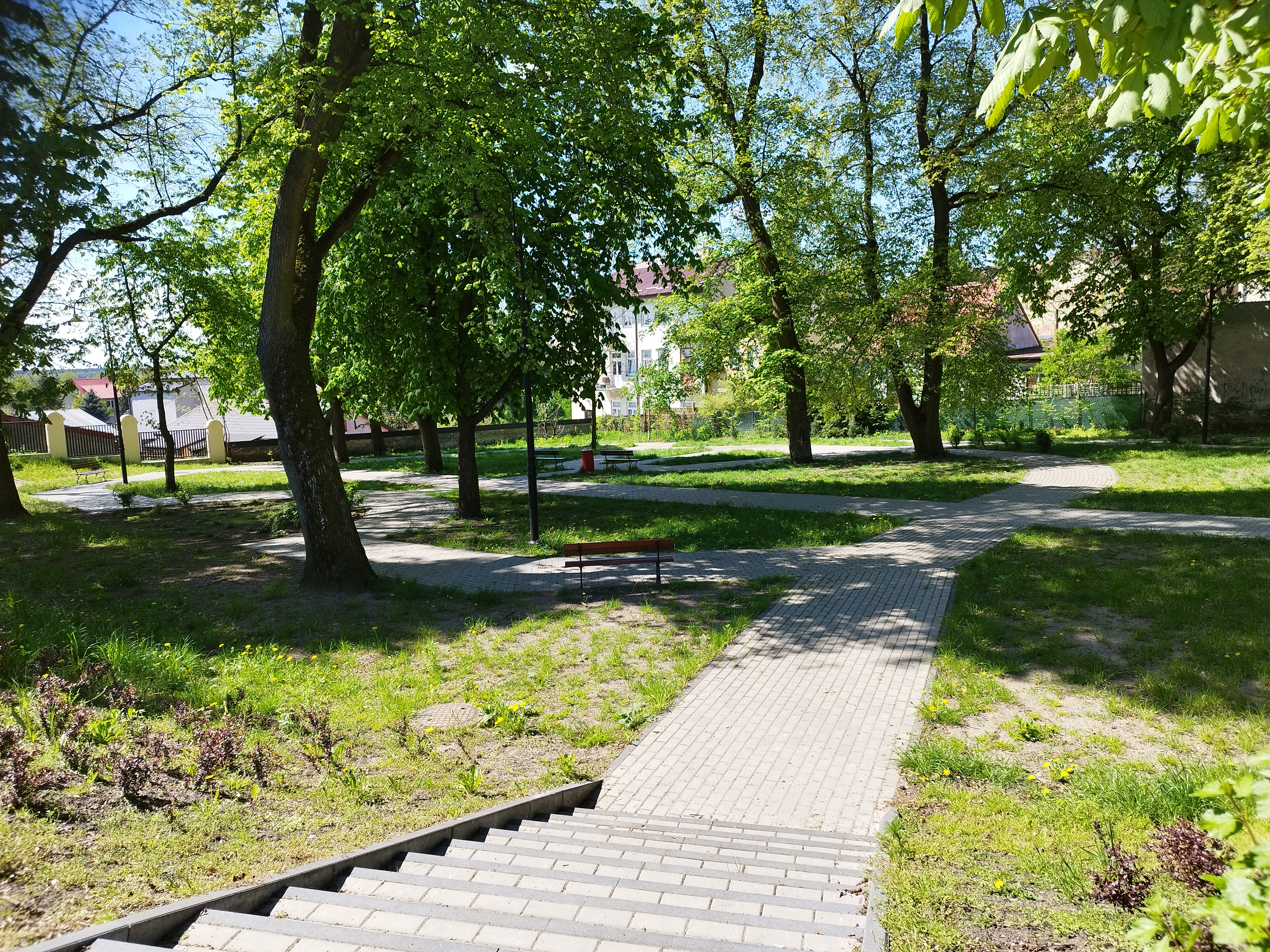
Chestnut Park.

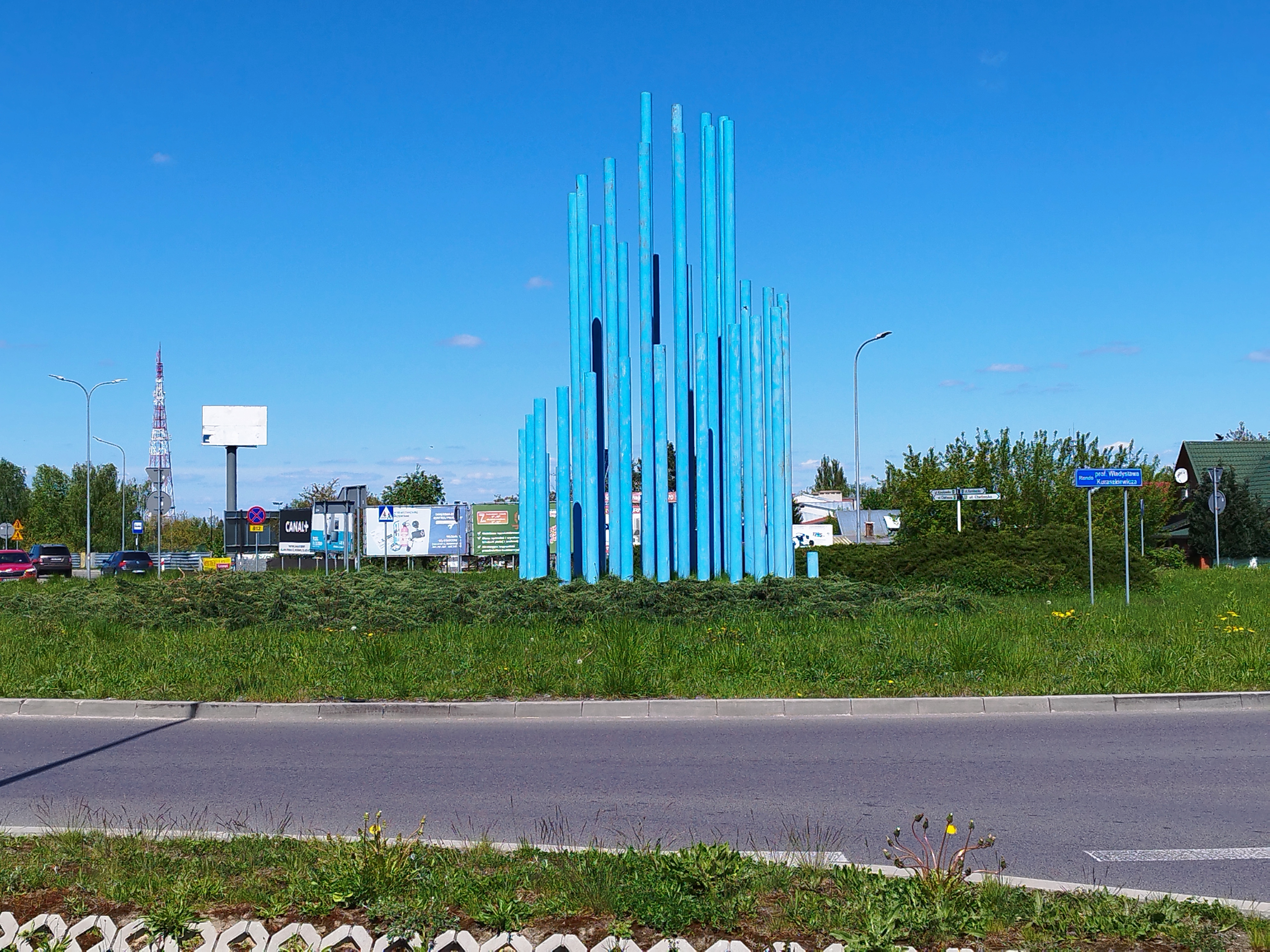
Władysław Kuraszkiewicz roundabout

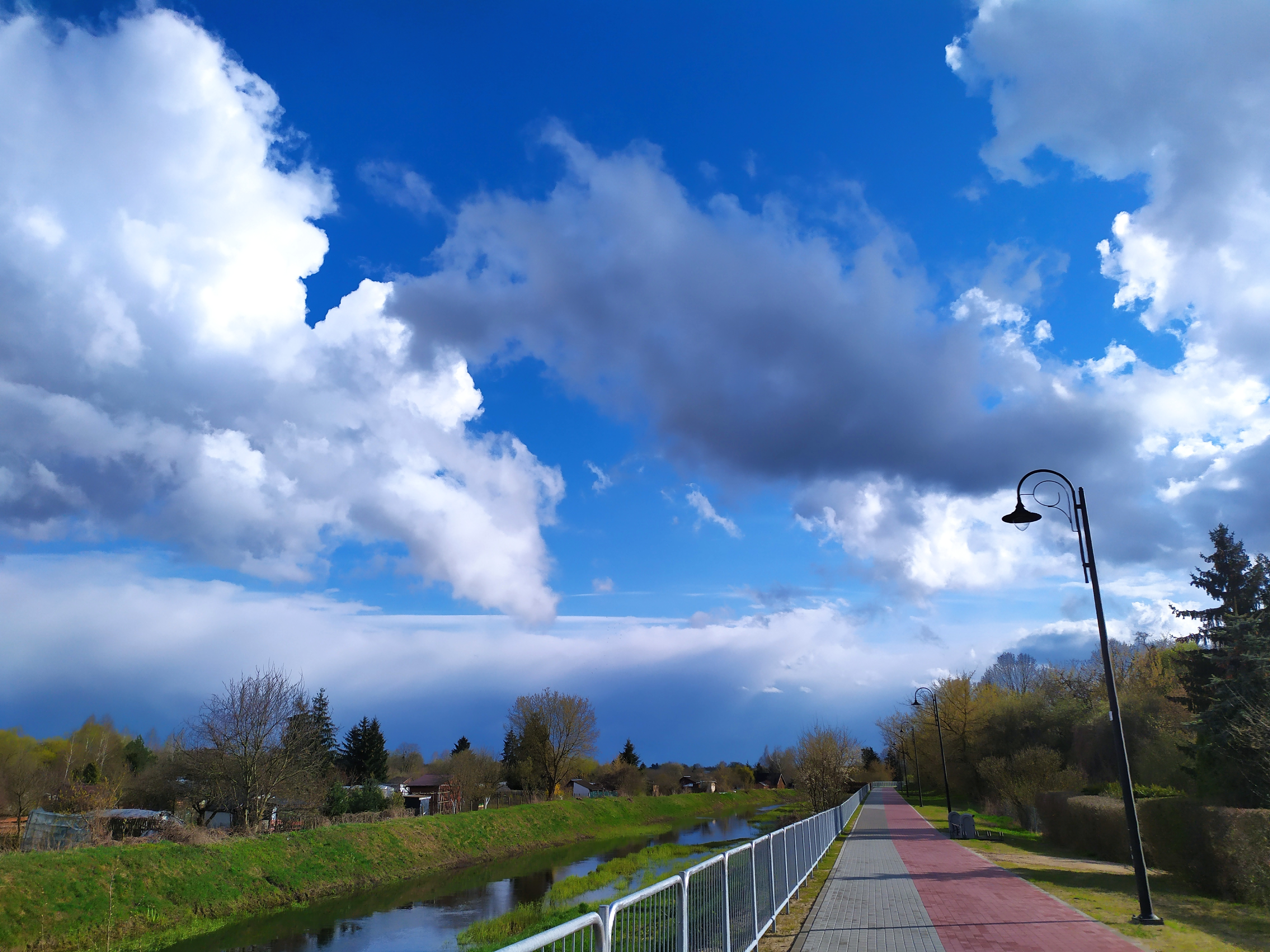
Włodawka river and promenade next to it

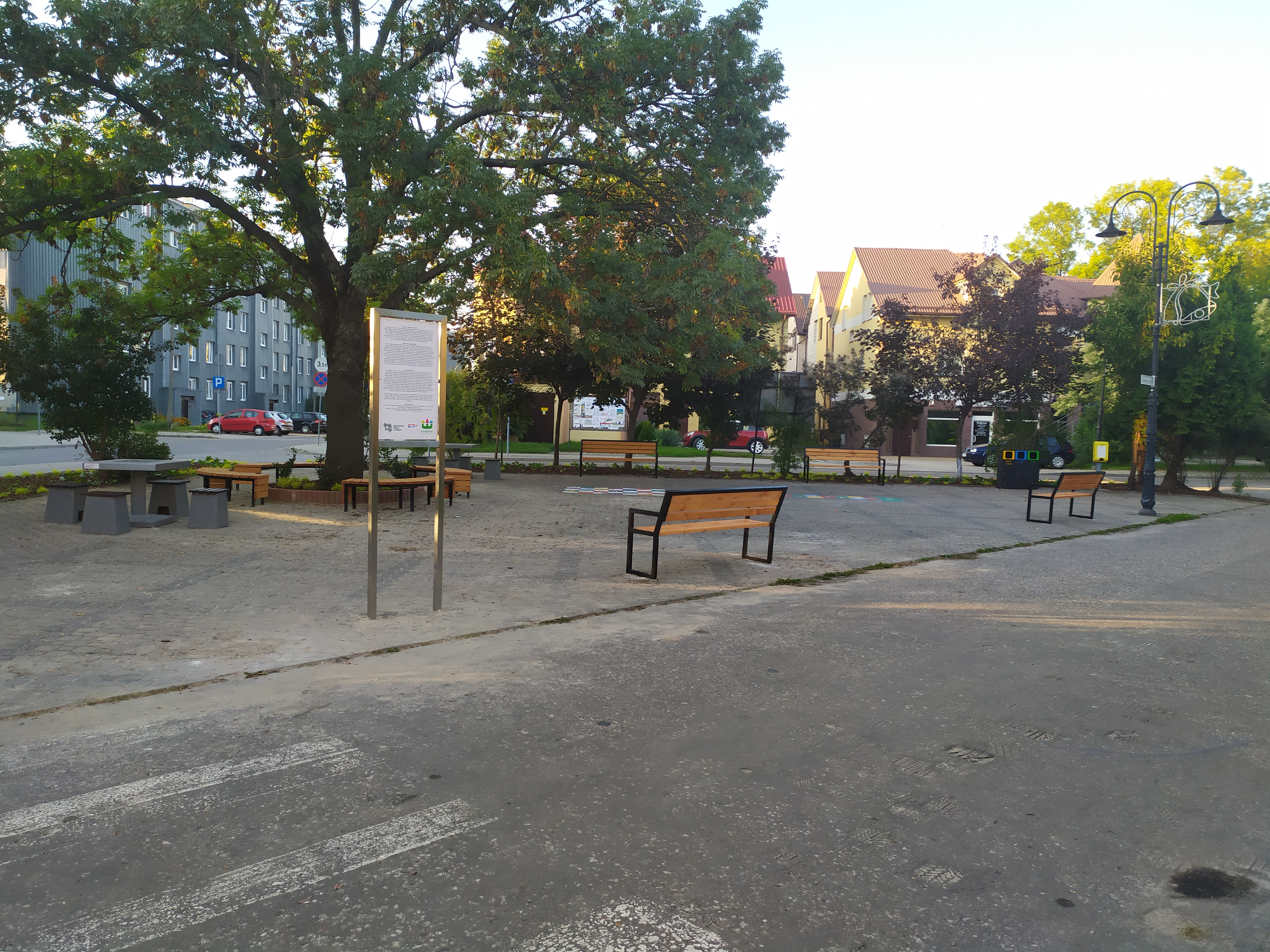
Sybiraków square.

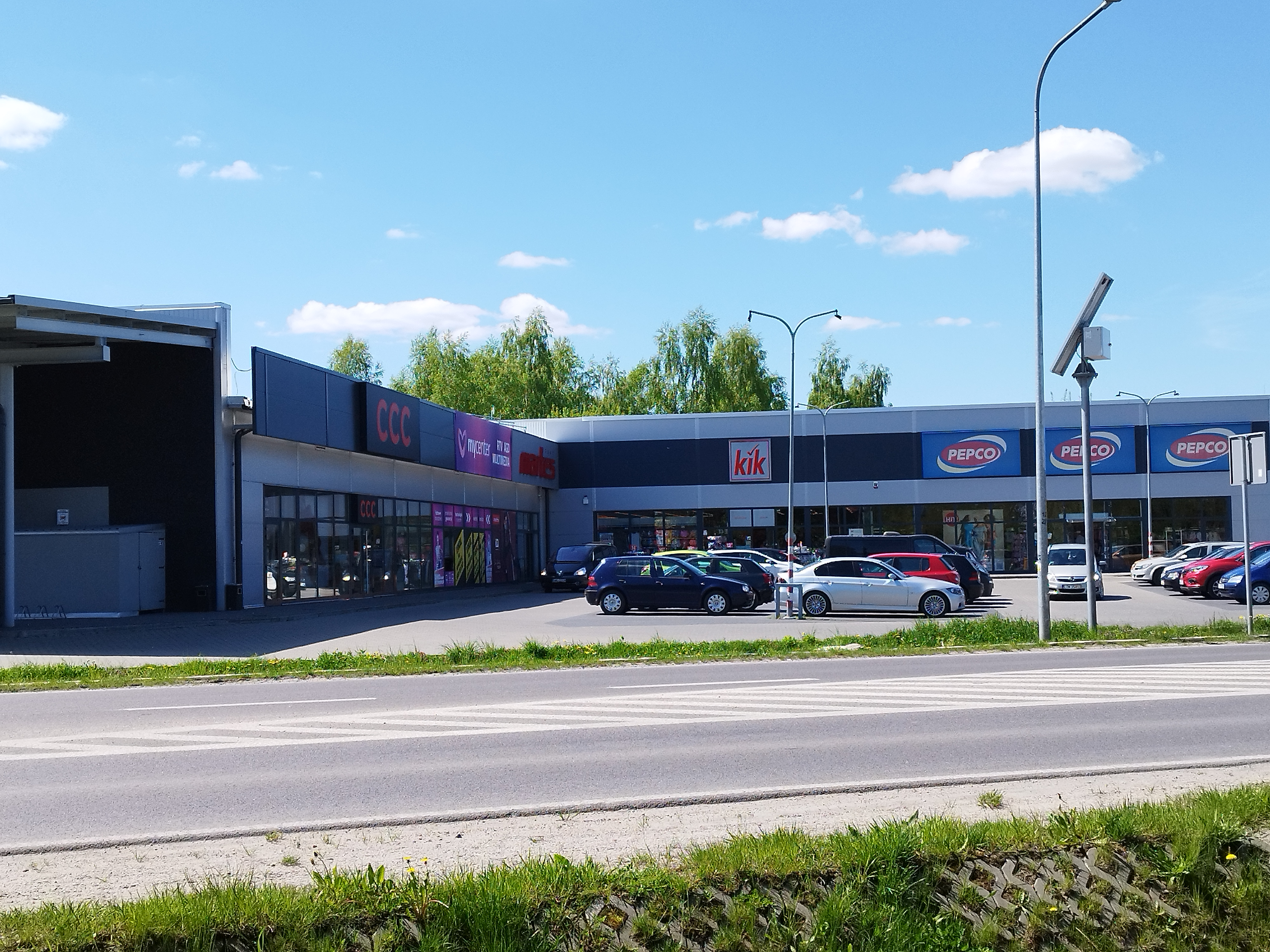
Włodawa shopping mall.

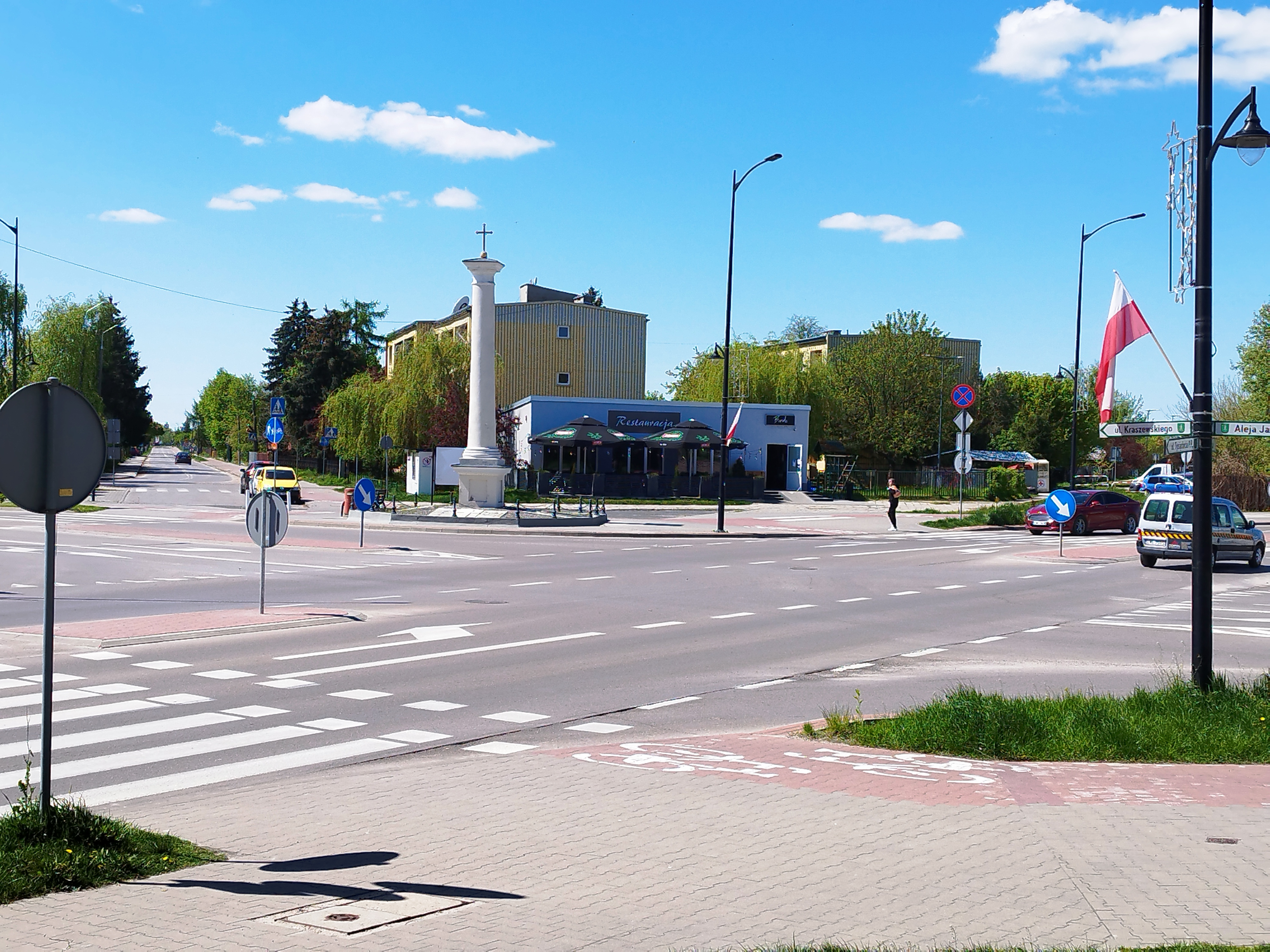
Crossroads with Tuscan column.

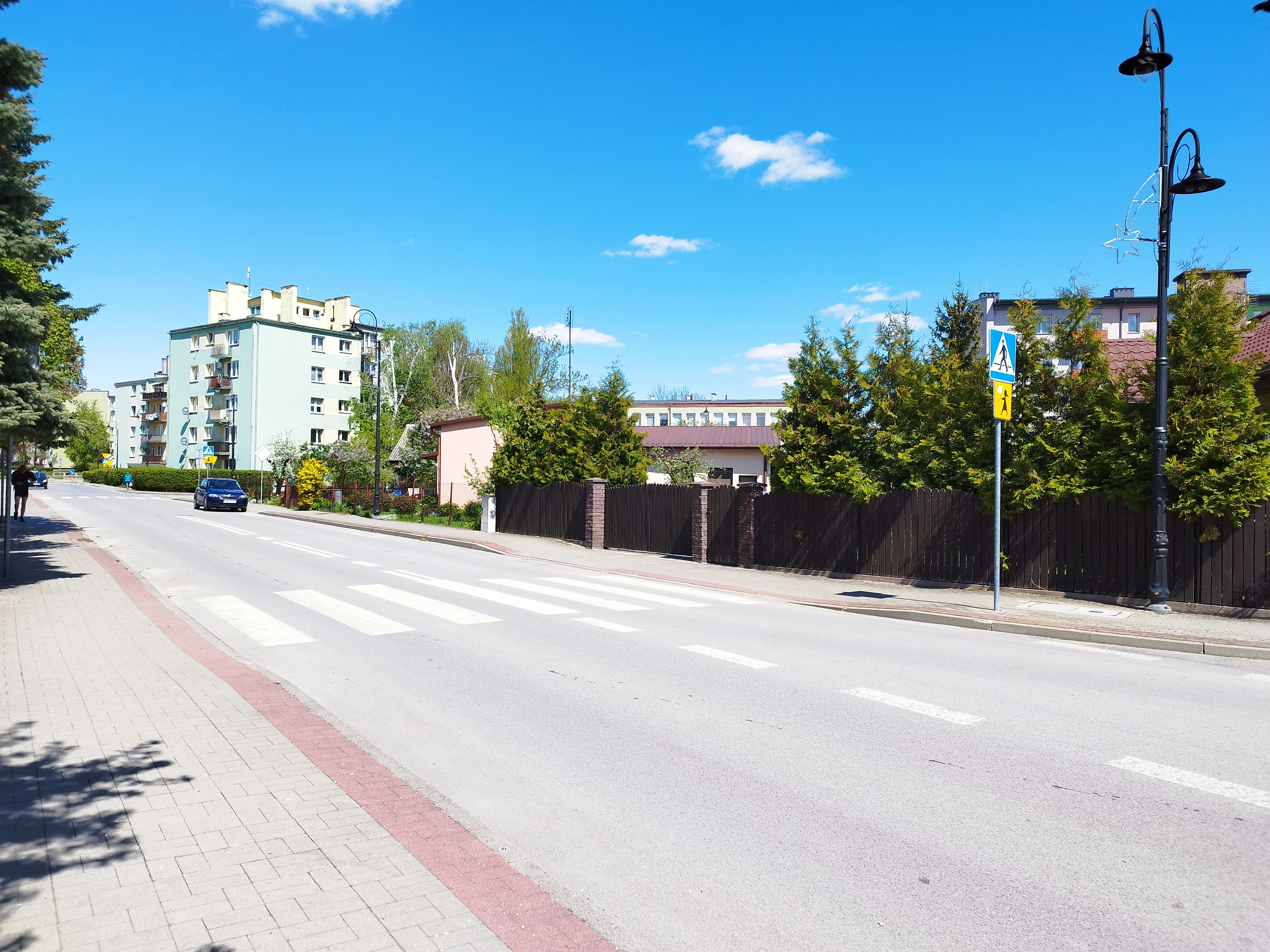
Furmańska street.

== Notable residents ==
- Shmuel Shlomo Leiner (1909-1942), Radziner Rebbe
- Andrzej Grabarczyk (born 1953), actor
- Dariusz Kowaluk (born 1996), athlete
- Bolesław Masłowski (1851–1928), chemist
- Stanisław Masłowski (1853–1926), painter
- Alfred Sokołowski (1849-1924), physician
- Anna Uryniuk (born 1974), swimmer
- Łukasz Wiśniewski (born 1989), volleyball player
