= Wlodawa Synagogue (London) =

Former Orthodox synagogue in London, England, 1901–1987

Włodawa Synagogue
- Location of the former synagogue in the London Borough of Tower Hamlets

Religion
- Affiliation: Orthodox Judaism (former)
- Rite: Nusach Ashkenaz
- Ecclesiastical or organizational status: Synagogue (1901–1987)
- Ownership: Wlodowa Charity Trust and Benevolent Fund
- Status: Closed

Location
- Location: 21 Cheshire Street, Bethnal Green, Tower Hamlets, London, England
- Country: United Kingdom
- Interactive map of Włodawa Synagogue
- Coordinates: 51°31′25″N 0°04′11″W

Architecture
- Type: Synagogue architecture
- Established: 1901 (as a congregation)
- Completed: 1910
- Materials: Brick

The Włodawa Synagogue is a former Orthodox Jewish congregation and synagogue, located at 21 Cheshire Street, Bethnal Green, Tower Hamlets, in London, England, in the United Kingdom.

== History ==
The congregation was established in 1901 by Jews from Włodawa, Poland, and by London Jewish cabinetmakers. The congregation therefore had two names, Włodowa Synagogue and the United Workingmen's Synagogue. Immigrant synagogues were frequently named after towns of immigrant origin, much as immigrant parishes were frequently named after the patron saint of towns of the immigrants' origin.

The congregation's first building was in Spital Square, and the 1910 move to Cheshire Street was concurrent with a merger with the Hare Street Synagogue. Because of the large number of cabinetmakers in the congregation, the interior woodwork of the simple, three-storey brick building was said to be particularly beautiful.

The synagogue closed in 1987.

== See also ==
- History of the Jews in England
- List of synagogues in the United Kingdom
