= List of people responsible for the Treblinka extermination camp =

The Treblinka extermination camp was run by the SS, a Nazi paramilitary organization, with the help of Eastern European Trawnikis (Hiwis), who were collaborationist auxiliary police recruited directly from Soviet POW camps. The Trawnikis served at all the major extermination camps, including Treblinka. Treblinka was part of Operation Reinhard, the systematic extermination of the three million Jews living in the General Government of German-occupied Poland. It is believed that between somewhere between 800,000 and 1,200,000 people were murdered in its gas chambers, almost all of whom were Jews. More people were murdered at Treblinka than at any other Nazi extermination camp besides Auschwitz.

The camp consisted of two separate units: Treblinka I and the Treblinka II extermination camp (Vernichtungslager). The first was a forced-labour camp (Arbeitslager) whose prisoners worked in the gravel pit or irrigation area and in the forest, where they cut wood to fuel the crematoria. Between 1941 and 1944, more than half of its 20,000 inmates died from summary executions, hunger, disease and mistreatment.

Meanwhile, the first official German trial for war crimes committed at Treblinka was also held in 1964, with the former camp personnel first brought to justice at that time, some twenty years after the end of the war.

== List of individuals responsible ==
Name	Rank	Function and Notes	Citation
Nazi leadership
Heinrich Himmler	Reichsführer	main architect of the Holocaust
Odilo Globocnik	SS-Hauptsturmführer and SS-Polizeiführer at the time (Captain and SS Police Chief) SS-Gruppenführer and SS and Polizei Leader of Lublin.	head of Operation Reinhard
Hermann Höfle	SS-Sturmbannführer (Major)	coordinator of Operation Reinhard
Christian Wirth	SS-Hauptsturmführer at the time (Captain)	inspector for Operation Reinhard
Richard Thomalla	SS-Obersturmführer at the time (First Lieutenant)	head of death camp construction during Operation Reinhard
Erwin Lambert	SS-Unterscharführer (Corporal)	head of gas chamber construction during Operation Reinhard (large gas chambers)
Treblinka commandants
Theodor van Eupen	SS-Sturmbannführer (Major), Commandant of Treblinka I Arbeitslager, 15 November 1941 – July 1944 (cleanup)	head of the forced-labour camp
Irmfried Eberl	SS-Obersturmführer (First Lieutenant), Commandant of Treblinka II, 11 July 1942 – 26 August 1942	transferred to Berlin due to incompetence
Franz Stangl	SS-Obersturmführer (First Lieutenant), 2nd Commandant of Treblinka II, 1 September 1942 – August 1943	transferred to Treblinka from Sobibor extermination camp
Kurt Franz	SS-Untersturmführer (Second Lieutenant), last Commandant of Treblinka II, August (gassing) – November 1943	promoted from deputy commandant in August 1943 following camp prisoner revolt
Deputy commandants
Karl Pötzinger	SS-Oberscharführer (Staff Sergeant), Deputy commandant of Treblinka II	head of cremation
Heinrich Matthes	SS-Scharführer (Sergeant), Deputy commandant	chief of the extermination area
Staff
Fritz Schmidt	SS-Sturmbannführer (Major)	gas chambers
Lorenz Hackenholt	SS-Hauptscharführer (Master Sergeant)	gas chambers, gas pipes
Kurt Küttner	SS-Oberscharführer (Staff Sergeant)	lower camp of Treblinka II
Willy Mätzig	SS-Oberscharführer (Staff Sergeant)	unloading ramp
Herbert Floss	SS-Scharführer (Sergeant)	cremation pyres
Erich Fuchs	SS-Scharführer (Sergeant)	generator, gassing engine
Josef Hirtreiter	SS-Scharführer (Sergeant)	unloading ramp terror
Karl Emil Ludwig	SS-Scharführer (Sergeant)	head of the Waldkommando forest brigade
Gustav Münzberger	SS-Unterscharführer (Corporal)	gas chambers
Max Biala	SS-Unterscharführer (Corporal)	stabbed to death by inmate Meir Berliner on 11 September 1942 at roll call selection
Paul Bredow	SS-Unterscharführer (Corporal)	head of Kommando Rot
Hans Hingst	SS-Unterscharführer (Corporal)	gas chambers
Otto Horn	SS-Unterscharführer (Corporal)	corpse detail
Willi Mentz	SS-Unterscharführer (Corporal)	Lazaret killing station
August Miete	SS-Unterscharführer (Corporal)	Lazaret
Max Möller	SS-Unterscharführer (Corporal)	Lazaret
Willi Post	SS-Unterscharführer (Corporal)	Head of Ukrainian Guard, Volksdeutsche SS squad leader
Albert Rum	SS-Unterscharführer (Corporal)	gas chambers
Karl Schiffer	SS-Unterscharführer (Corporal)	command of Ukrainian guard unit of 12 Trawnikis overseeing farmhouse construction
Ernst Stengelin	SS-Unterscharführer (Corporal)	killed in attack on 14 October 1943
Franz Suchomel	SS-Unterscharführer (Corporal)	Goldjuden supervisor
Otto Stadie	SS-Stabsscharführer (Staff Squad Leader)	camp administration
Ivan Marchenko	Wachmann (Guard), presumed Ukrainian	gas chambers
Feodor Fedorenko	Wachmann (Guard)	gas chambers
