= Treblinka uprising =

1943 rebellion and mass escape of prisoners

- Part of World War II
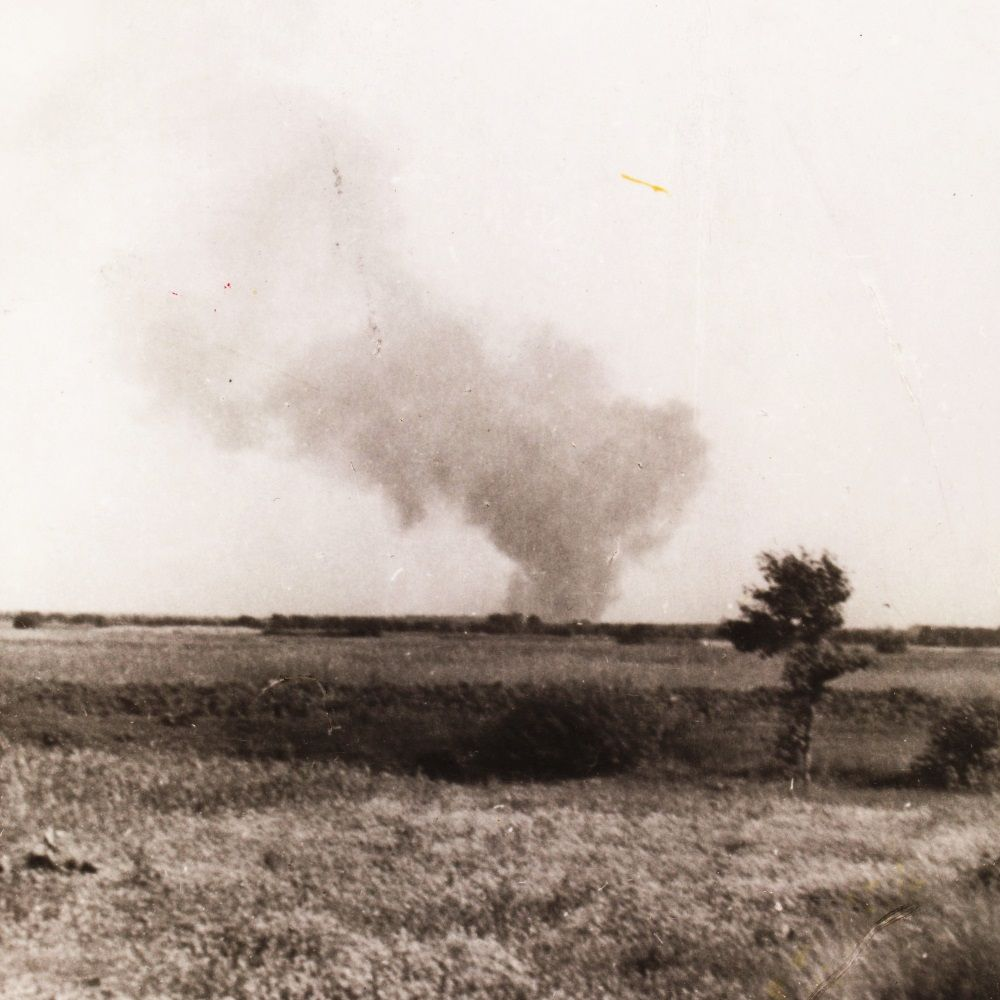
- Treblinka extermination camp set on fire by rebellious prisoners; photo secretly taken by Franciszek Ząbecki
Date	August 2, 1943
Location	Treblinka extermination camp 52°37′51.85″N 22°03′11.01″E
Result	escape of 400 prisoners partial burning of the camp

Belligerents
Nazi Germany	Camp underground

Commanders and leaders
Franz Stangl	Marceli Galewski †; Želomir Bloch †; Cwi Kurland †

Strength
From 30 to 40 Germans from 90 to 120 Trawniki men	About 840 prisoners

Casualties and losses
1 wounded German from 5 to 6 killed and wounded Trawniki men	From 350 to 400 killed
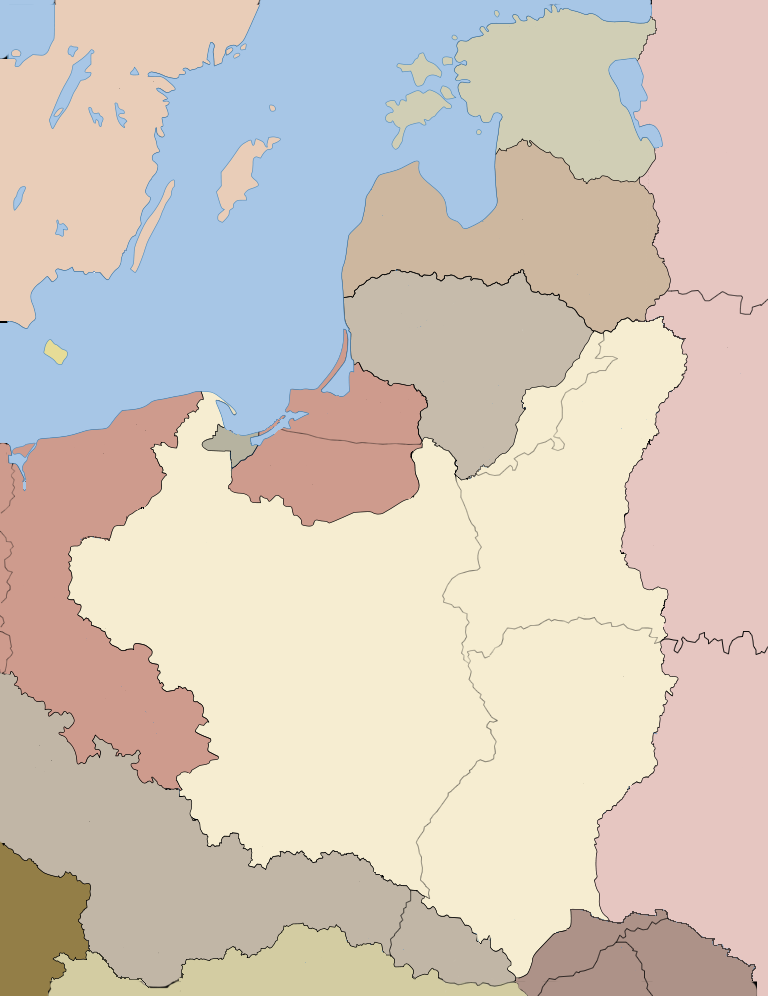
- Location within Poland

The Treblinka uprising, also known as the Treblinka revolt, was a rebellion and mass escape of prisoners that took place on 2 August 1943 at the German Nazi Treblinka extermination camp.

The uprising was organized by members of the camp's underground resistance, which had formed in the early months of 1943. Its goal was to destroy the extermination center and enable a mass escape of the prisoners. The conspirators managed to acquire weapons from a German warehouse, but due to the premature start of the fight, they were unable to eliminate the camp staff or destroy the gas chambers. Out of approximately 840 prisoners who were in the camp at the time of the uprising, several hundred were killed in the fighting, and nearly 400 managed to escape. Fewer than 70 of the escapees survived the war.

== Origins ==
Treblinka II was one of the three extermination centers established by the Germans as part of Operation Reinhard. The camp operated from July 1942 and was dedicated to the extermination of the Jewish population. According to Jacek Młynarczyk, the minimum number of victims of Treblinka is estimated at 780,863.

From the outset, the Germans planned that all physical labor in the extermination camps – especially tasks directly related to the process of extermination – would be carried out by Arbeitsjuden, Jewish prisoners who were spared immediate death in the gas chambers. Skilled workers and young, strong men capable of heavy labor were selected from the transports arriving at Treblinka. The number of those "selected" varied based on current needs – sometimes a few hundred people were chosen, while at other times only a few or none were spared. On average, between 700 and 1,500 prisoners worked in the reception and administrative-living areas of the camp, commonly referred to as the "lower camp". Their tasks included leading victims from the trains, forcing them to undress, sorting looted clothing and belongings, cutting women's hair, and performing various other duties for the camp and its guards.

Up to 300 Jews worked in the extermination area, commonly known as the "upper camp" or "death camp" (German: Totenlager, Yiddish: Tojtlager). These prisoners faced particularly dire conditions, as their tasks involved emptying and cleaning the gas chambers, extracting gold teeth from corpses, and burying the bodies in mass graves (later, burning them).

In the early months of the camp's operation, there was a high turnover among the Arbeitsjuden. The Germans and Trawniki men (Note: The guards at the Treblinka II extermination camp were the so-called Trawniki men, Eastern European collaborators trained at the SS camp in Trawniki. In most cases, they were Soviet prisoners of war who, for various reasons, agreed to serve the Germans. Prisoners referred to them as "Ukrainians", and this term commonly appears in sources about the camp's history. However, this is not an entirely accurate designation, as the Germans aimed to recruit not only ethnic Ukrainians but primarily Soviet Volksdeutsche (ethnic Germans) and members of other non-Russian nationalities of the Soviet Union for the Trawniki units. Due to a shortage of recruits, it was also common for native Russians to be enlisted into the Trawniki units (Black (2004, pp. 105–108, 112); Młynarczyk (2013, p. 69)).) constantly tortured and killed prisoners, replacing the deceased with men selected from new transports. This constant turnover negatively impacted the efficiency of the prisoners' work. Additionally, each prisoner lived with the knowledge that they could be killed at any moment, leading some individuals to engage in acts of desperate resistance. A warning sign for the Germans was the death of SS officer Max Biala, who was fatally stabbed by Meir Berliner, a Jewish prisoner from Argentina. As a result, in September 1942, camp commandant Franz Stangl ordered the formation of permanent work squads. Over time, the number of executions was reduced, prisoners were assigned numbers, and their living conditions were slightly improved. One of the earliest escapees, Jakub Krzepicki, had fled the camp in September 1942 and dictated a detailed account of its operation that reached the Warsaw Ghetto through the Ringelblum Archive.

== Camp resistance ==
In early 1943, conditions arose that allowed for the organization of a resistance movement within the camp. First, the reduction in the number of executions significantly decreased the turnover among the "working Jews". Second, fewer transports were arriving at Treblinka, raising fears among the prisoners that the camp might soon be liquidated and that they themselves would be murdered. The Jews also received fragments of information about German defeats at Battle of Stalingrad and on other fronts, leading them to conclude that the Germans would seek to eliminate witnesses to the genocide. (Note: The prisoners' intuition was correct, as during a visit to Treblinka in late February or early March 1943, Reichsführer-SS Heinrich Himmler decided to liquidate the camp, ordering that the hundreds of thousands of bodies buried in mass graves be burned beforehand, and to accept a small number of transports from Yugoslavia and Greece (Arad (1999, pp. 165–168)).) While there had been some chances of escaping the camp in its early months, by the fall of 1942, the Germans had significantly tightened security measures, causing escapes to nearly cease by the beginning of the following year. The restriction of individual escape opportunities, combined with the fear of a mass extermination of all prisoners, led the Arbeitsjuden to begin contemplating an armed uprising and collective escape.

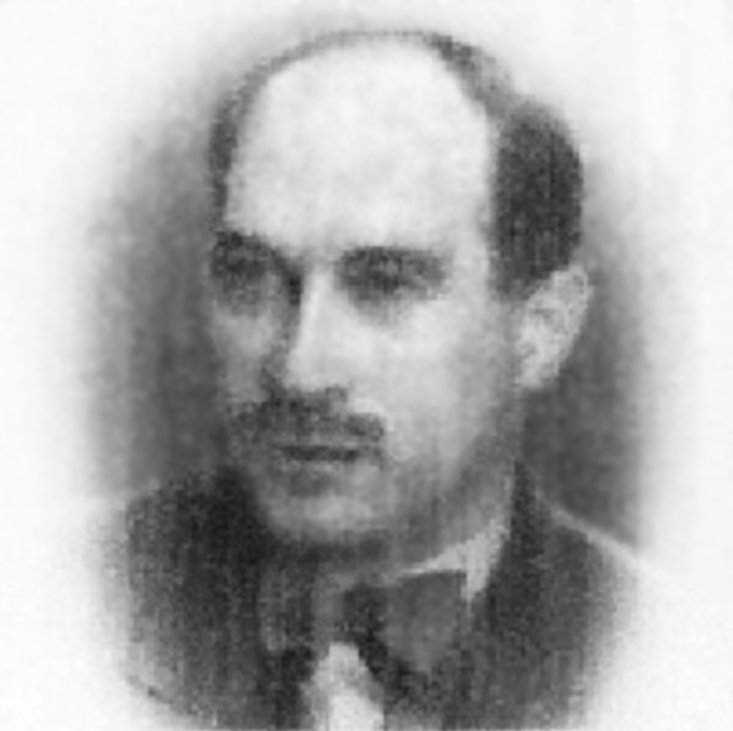
Julian Chorążycki, the first leader of the resistance in Treblinka

In late February or early March 1943, a group of prisoners from the "lower camp" formed an Organizing Committee. Its founding members were: Julian Chorążycki (a medical doctor from Warsaw and a captain in the Polish Armed Forces), Cwi Kurland (a kapo at the execution site in the Treblinka camp), Želomir Bloch (an officer in the Czechoslovak Army and a vorarbeiter in the sorting command), Izrael Sudowicz (an agriculturist from Warsaw), and Władysław Salzberg (a furrier from Kielce and the head of the tailoring workshop). After some time, Adolf Friedman from Łódź (a kapo in the sorting command, allegedly a soldier in the French Foreign Legion) also joined them. Other prisoners were also members of the committee, though there is conflicting information about their identities. Chorążycki was the unofficial leader of the group, while Želomir Bloch served as the military expert. All conspirators were functionary prisoners or belonged to the group of "court Jews" (German: Hofjuden), placing them at the top of the camp's prisoner hierarchy. Most of them were mature men from intellectual backgrounds.

The committee did not intend to recruit too many members and focused its efforts on acquiring weapons. Since the prisoners secretly hoarded gold and valuables left behind by the gassed Jews, they initially planned to bribe the Trawniki men or acquire weapons through Polish peasants, with whom the forest work commands near the camp maintained occasional contact. However, these attempts were unsuccessful. Moreover, before the Organizing Committee could expand its activities, it suffered several setbacks. In the second half of March, a large number of "lower camp" prisoners, including Želomir Bloch and Adolf Friedman, were transferred to work in the extermination area. In early April, Dr. Chorążycki committed suicide after the Germans discovered money intended to bribe the guards.

Shortly after Chorążycki's death, Benjamin Rakowski, the camp elder (German: Lagerälteste), joined the committee. In April, their efforts to obtain weapons finally met with success. One day, the lock on the door of the armory in the German quarters broke, and a Jewish locksmith, Eugeniusz Turowski, took the opportunity to secretly make a key. (Note: In the testimonies of former prisoners, various accounts can be found regarding the circumstances under which access to the weapons storage was gained. Glazar (2011, pp. 115–116) claimed that one of the servant boys, Edek, deliberately damaged the lock. Jewish locksmiths then convinced the Germans that the door and lock needed to be taken to the workshop for repairs, as it could only be fixed there, and they secretly made an imprint of the key during this process. On the other hand, Willenberg (2016, pp. 159–160) asserted that during the construction of the storage room, the foreman from the construction commando guessed its intended purpose and, just in case, instructed the locksmiths to make a copy of the key.) Later that month, an ad hoc attempt was made to steal weapons. During the day, Jewish boys who served as orderlies for the SS (Putzer) secretly removed two boxes of grenades from the armory. However, when they delivered them to the conspirators, it was discovered that the grenades lacked fuses (which were stored separately). As a result, the boys had to discreetly return the boxes to the armory. After this incident, the committee's activities temporarily decreased. Lagerälteste Rakowski abandoned the idea of armed resistance, planning instead to escape with his lover and a group of trusted prisoners. However, before he could execute his escape plan, the Germans discovered hidden gold and valuables in his possession and executed him (around late April or early May).

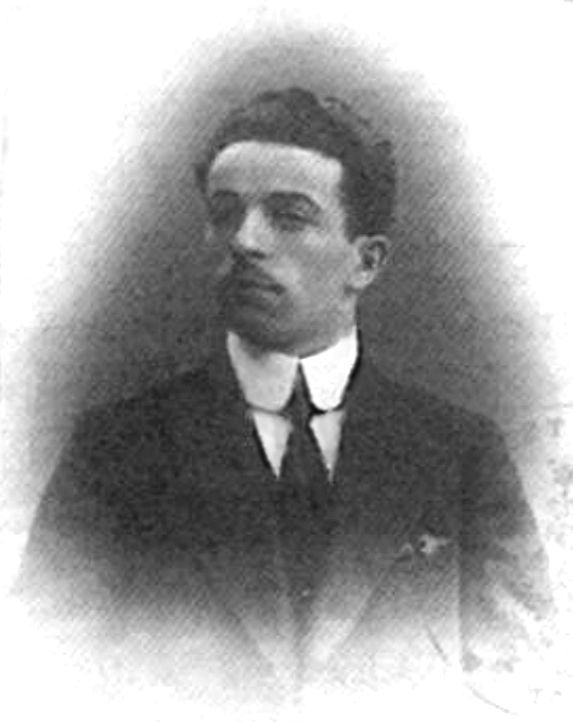
Berek Lajcher, the presumed second leader of the resistance

In May, news of the uprising in the Warsaw Ghetto reached the camp. The example set by the ghetto fighters served as inspiration for the prisoners in Treblinka. The impetus to resume preparations for the uprising was also provided by information about further defeats suffered by the Wehrmacht on the Eastern Front and in Africa. In June, new members joined the committee: Engineer Marceli Galewski, who took over as "camp elder" after Rakowski's death, (Note: Marceli Galewski was around 45 years old and hailed from Łódź. During the first months of the camp's existence, he served as the Lagerälteste (camp elder); however, during the winter of 1942/1943, he contracted typhus and was replaced by Benjamin Rakowski. After Rakowski was executed, Galewski returned to his previous position (Arad (1999, pp. 107, 275)).) and a man named Moniek from Warsaw (a kapo of the "court Jews"). Some sources also mention Rudolf Masarek (a half-Jew and officer in the Czechoslovak Army) and "Dr. Leichert from Węgrów". The latter, whose real name was Berek Lajcher, (Note: Berek Lajcher was a medical doctor, an officer in the Polish Armed Forces, and a veteran of the Polish–Soviet War. In the Węgrów ghetto, he was the head of the Jewish hospital and served as the president of the local branch of the Jewish Social Self-Help Organization. He arrived at Treblinka on 1 May 1943, three days after the liquidation of the ghetto (Weinfeld (2013, pp. 36–43)).) is said by Samuel Rajzman to have replaced Dr. Chorążycki and become the de facto leader of the conspiratorial group. Other sources identify Galewski as the new leader of the resistance, while more recent publications suggest that the leader could also have been Mojshe Lubling from Wolbrom, who arrived in Treblinka in early October 1942. There is no consensus on this matter. The renewed committee consisted of about 10 members, with only Kurland, Sudowicz, and Salzberg remaining from the original group. Soon, the conspiracy began recruiting new members, and by July 1943, its numbers had grown to about 60 people. The conspirators were divided into sections of 5 to 10 members.

Parallel to the development of the resistance in the "lower camp", its foundations were also being laid in the Totenlager (extermination area). The main initiators were Želomir Bloch and Adolf Friedman, who had been transferred from the "lower camp" in March 1943. The conditions under which they conducted their conspiracy work were very difficult. Unlike the conspirators in the "lower camp", who had the support of the prisoner leadership, they had to avoid contact with Oberkapo Singer and his supporters, who were reputed to be collaborators and informers. They also had no way to secretly acquire firearms. The relatively small number of prisoners and the unfavorable topography of the "upper camp" also placed potential insurgents at a disadvantage. Nevertheless, by late May or early June, a separate Organizing Committee was already operating in the "upper camp", though the names of its members, apart from Bloch and Friedman, remain unknown. The total number of conspirators reached several dozen; like in the "lower camp", they were divided into five-person teams. The carpenter Jankiel Wiernik, who was one of the few prisoners with the right to move between different camp zones due to his work, became the liaison between the two committees.

Despite the presence of some German informants among the "working Jews", both branches of the camp's resistance movement managed to avoid exposure. (Note: The resistance movement was nearly exposed during a typhus epidemic that struck the camp at the turn of 1942 and 1943. A man named Kronenberg, a journalist for the Lviv newspaper Chwila, was taken for execution, like many other sick prisoners. At one point, he began begging for his life to SS-Unterscharführer August Miete, shouting that there was a conspiracy in the camp and that he could identify its members. However, a "Ukrainian" guard, who did not understand German, misinterpreted Kronenberg's behavior and shot him before he could provide more detailed information to the SS officer. The prisoners who witnessed the event managed to convince Miete that Kronenberg had gone mad with fear (Willenberg (2016, pp. 85–88)).)

== Decision ==
Despite the growing ranks of the resistance, the Organizing Committee delayed the decision to start the uprising. This hesitation was due both to the awareness of the risks involved and to the fact that living conditions in the "lower camp" noticeably improved between June and July 1943. The Germans slightly relaxed discipline, and the reduced number of transports meant that prisoners were no longer overburdened with work. Additionally, the camp staff began to initiate or allow various "entertainments" or cultural activities for the Jews, aiming to distract them from the impending liquidation of the camp.

In contrast, the atmosphere among the prisoners in the "upper camp" was entirely different. Since March, they had been working on the exhumation and cremation of nearly 700,000 corpses buried in mass graves. By the second half of July, this work was nearing completion, and it became clear to the prisoners that they would be murdered soon after the last of the bodies were burned. Through Jankiel Wiernik, they began to pressure the Organizing Committee to urgently set a date for the uprising. However, Galewski and his comrades responded evasively to these demands. Meanwhile, the cremation of bodies had progressed so far that the Germans held a celebration to mark the nearing end of the work. The tension among the prisoners in the Totenlager (extermination area) reached its peak at this point. Eventually, the leaders of the resistance in the "upper camp" issued an ultimatum to the "lower camp", threatening that if a date for the uprising was not immediately set, the "upper camp" would revolt on its own. It was clear to Galewski and the other leaders that a revolt in the Totenlager alone had no chance of success and could lead to the retaliatory massacre of all the prisoners. It is likely that during meetings held from 30 to 31 July, the decision was made for the uprising to begin on Monday, August 2, in the afternoon.

== Plan ==
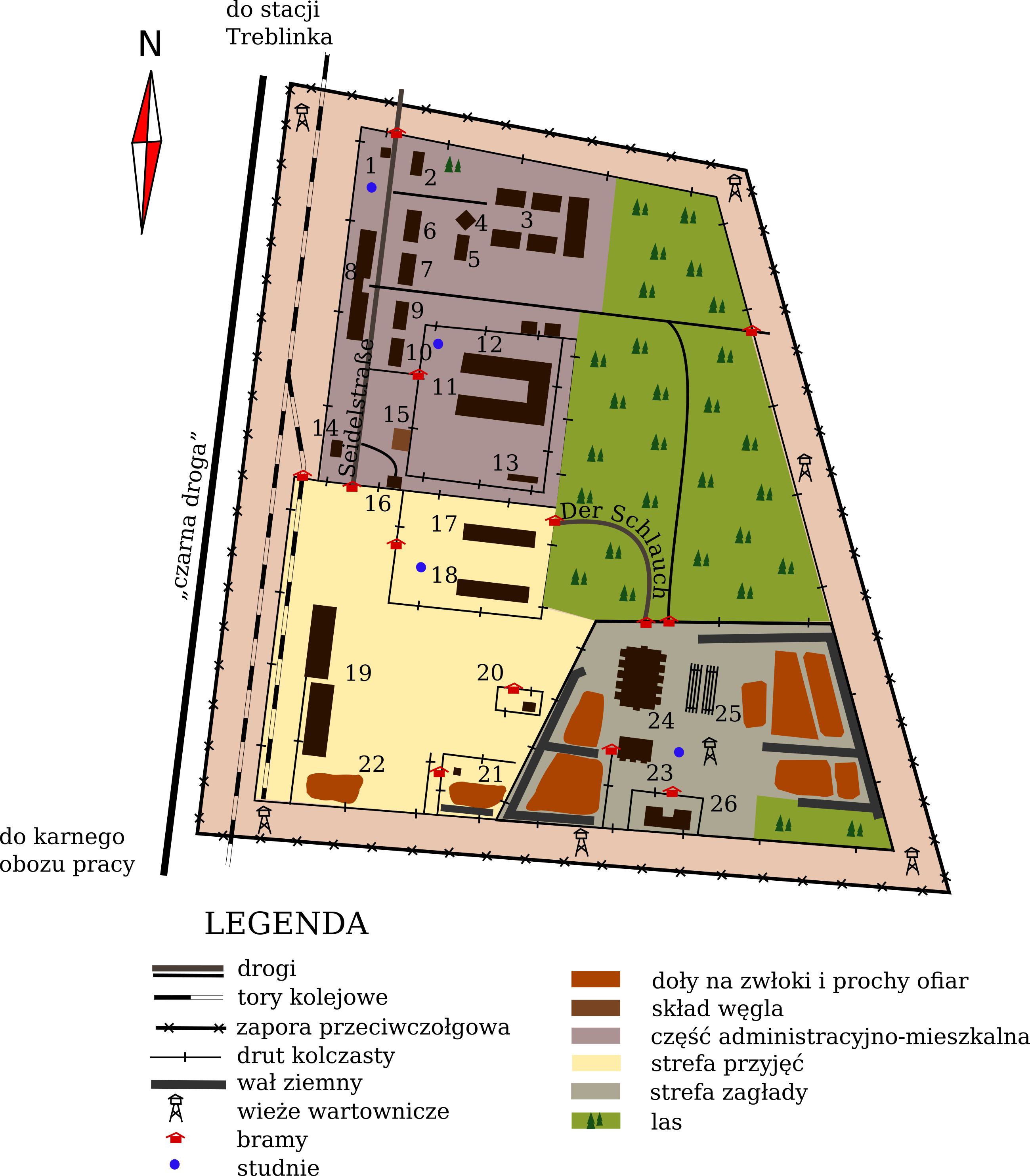
Plan of the Treblinka extermination camp

The primary objective of the conspirators in the Treblinka extermination camp was to seize control and destroy the camp. Only after achieving this would they attempt a mass escape. The escape plan involved fleeing northward and eastward, crossing the Bug river, and hiding in the Białowieża Forest.

The leaders of the Organizing Committee recognized that the revolt had to begin during the day. At that time, the German barracks were empty, which was crucial for the boys serving the Germans to retrieve weapons from the armory. Additionally, during the day, the Germans and Ukrainian guards were dispersed throughout the camp and somewhat mingled with the Jewish prisoners, whereas at night, they were concentrated in the residential zone, and the prisoners were confined under guard in locked barracks. The conspirators understood that the Germans would likely launch a large-scale pursuit of the escapees, so they concluded that the takeover of the camp should occur during the day, while the initial escape phase would take place under the cover of darkness. Moreover, a train carrying several hundred Polish and Jewish prisoners from work in Małkinia to the nearby labor camp Treblinka I passed near the camp daily at 4:45 PM. The conspirators hoped to stop the train and enlist these prisoners in the fight. (Note: Some surviving prisoners claimed that if the conspirators had achieved complete success, they intended to attack the labor camp and free the Poles and Jews held there (Rajchman (2011, p. 89); Webb & Chocholatý (2014, p. 105)).) Considering these factors, the committee leaders decided the uprising would begin at 4:30 PM, half an hour before the end of the workday.

The plan devised in the "lower camp" called for four young servants, led by a boy from Warsaw named Markus, to start secretly removing weapons from the armory about two hours before the uprising. Once the weapons were distributed, the combat teams would take their assigned positions. During this time, they also intended to lure as many German SS men as possible to the workshops and kill them quietly. The signal to begin open combat was to be a grenade explosion. The Sudowicz commando, which worked in the vegetable garden and animal pens, was tasked with ensuring the weapons were retrieved from the armory and then attacking the German barracks and the guards' barracks. The fight within the prisoner area, commonly known as the "ghetto", was to be led by Salzberg. The actions of the rebels working in the "sorting yard" were to be directed by Kurland, with Galewski by his side, as he chose this location for his command post. The conspirators believed they could capture and set fire to the camp within an hour. They planned to kill all the German SS men – at the start of the uprising or, if possible, before it began – since they believed that without their leaders, the guards would surrender. (Note: The conspirators were aware that news of German defeats had significantly lowered the morale of the guards, so they hoped that killing the SS men would cause the guards to cease resisting. Nevertheless, they planned to kill the Ukrainians who would be stationed at guard posts at the time of the uprising (Arad (1999, p. 283)).) Due to the threat posed by informers, it was decided that the general prisoner population would only be informed about the uprising when the open fighting began.

The conspirators in the "upper camp" faced particularly challenging tasks. They knew the day of the uprising but were not informed of the exact time it would start. Moreover, due to the summer heat, work in the Totenlager (extermination area) ended at noon. This meant there was a risk that at the time of the uprising, all the Jews would be within the barbed-wire-enclosed prisoner zone, where the guards in the watchtowers and at the entrance could easily pin them down with machine gun fire. It was decided that on the morning of August 2, Wiernik would go to the "lower camp" to find out the exact time of the uprising. They also decided to exhume as many bodies as possible to extend the workday into the afternoon. A plan was also made to neutralize the most dangerous watchtower, located in the central part of the Totenlager. Shortly before the fighting was to begin, several conspirators would lure the guard down, supposedly to offer him gold and dollars in exchange for food, and then quietly kill him.

== Uprising ==
=== Course of events ===
On the evening of August 1, Cwi Kurland administered an oath to the members of the conspiracy in the "lower camp". The next morning, the prisoners went to work as usual. Under the pretense of performing their daily tasks, they sharpened knives and axes and prepared gasoline canisters. The excitement, which the conspirators struggled to hide, quickly spread to the Jews who were not privy to the uprising plans. Sensing that something extraordinary was about to happen – perhaps the uprising that had been rumored for some time – prisoners began to retrieve spare clothing, gold, currency, and valuables they had hidden in case of an escape. After the lunch break, around 1:00 PM, Galewski assigned additional conspirator-workers to the commandos working in critical areas of the "lower camp". In the meantime, events occurred that slightly shifted the balance of power in favor of the insurgents. Shortly after noon, 4 SS men and 16 guards, including Deputy Commandant SS-Untersturmführer Kurt Franz, left the camp to bathe in the Bug river. (Note: Franz Suchomel claimed that, in reality, Franz did not go to bathe in the Bug river, but was visiting his lover in Ostrów Mazowiecka (Sereny (2002, p. 208)).) Earlier that morning, Commandant Franz Stangl was visited by a fellow officer serving in an Eastern collaborator unit stationed in Kosów Lacki. Both men reportedly consumed significant amounts of alcohol.

The removal of weapons from the warehouse was scheduled to begin at 2:00 PM. However, complications arose when an SS man, Max Möller, unexpectedly stayed behind in the building. Eventually, Sudowicz managed to lure Möller outside, but the timeline already experienced its first delay. Worse still, the process of removing the weapons proved to be very time-consuming. The boys had to carefully pack firearms and grenades into small bags, which they then pulled through a window and carried individually to the garage. Jewish workers from the construction commando hid the bags in wheelbarrows and distributed them to various points in the "lower camp". While the weapons were being moved, a member of the disinfection commando began dousing the walls of wooden barracks and workshops with gasoline under the pretext of routine sanitation. Rudek Lubrenicki, who oversaw the camp's vehicle park, discreetly sabotaged the engine of an armored car parked in the garage.

Final preparations were also underway in the Totenlager. In the morning, Wiernik obtained permission to go to the "lower camp", supposedly to collect additional planks needed for construction work. Once there, he contacted the conspirators and was informed of the time the uprising would begin. Meanwhile, the gravedigger commando had exhumed so many corpses from the pits that the deputy head of the "upper camp", SS-Unterscharführer Karl Pötzinger, agreed that a group of about 30 young men could burn them in the afternoon. Not wanting to arouse Pötzinger's suspicion with this unexpected zeal, Friedman negotiated extra bread rations for the workers. In the afternoon, a group of "water carriers" also found themselves outside the prisoner area. They worked particularly slowly to avoid returning to the barracks too quickly. The group, usually composed of 2 to 3 Jews, was expanded to 5; among them was Želomir Bloch. Soon after, all Germans left the Totenlager, leaving only the guards behind. Both teams working outside the prisoner area were each assigned one guard, a third guard was stationed at the gate in the fence surrounding the barracks, and two others took positions in the watchtowers.

Soon after, events unfolded that disrupted the conspirators' carefully laid plans. Around 3:30 PM, the head of the "lower camp", SS-Oberscharführer Kurt Küttner, appeared in the "ghetto". Moments later, the block leader of Barrack No. 2, a man named Kuba, asked to speak with him in private. Kuba was a known informant, so Salzberg, fearing exposure, sent a messenger to Galewski, asking for permission to immediately eliminate the German. Meanwhile, Küttner, having finished his conversation with Kuba, left the barrack and encountered a young Jew who was not supposed to be in the "ghetto" at that time. He quickly searched him, finding money hidden for an escape attempt. Just as Küttner was about to drag the prisoner out of the "ghetto", the messenger returned, accompanied by an armed conspirator named Wallabańczyk (or Wołowańczyk), who had been sent by Galewski to kill the SS man. Wallabańczyk immediately drew his pistol and shot Küttner. It was around 4:00 PM.

The shot fired at Küttner signaled the start of the uprising. Soon, chaotic gunfire erupted in various parts of the "lower camp". Galewski, who had unfortunately chosen a poor command post, quickly lost control of the battle. The disparity in forces was significant, as the boys had managed to remove only a few dozen grenades and a handful of pistols and rifles with limited ammunition from the warehouse. Nonetheless, the conspirators began carrying out their pre-assigned tasks. Sudowicz's group threw grenades at the commandant's office. Lubrenicki, along with a Czech Jew named Stanisław "Standa" Lichtblau, blew up the camp's fuel depot. The insurgents in the sorting area attempted to engage the Ukrainian guards, particularly the watchtowers along the southern section of the fence. Salzberg and his men killed the block leader Kuba and began setting fire to the barracks and workshops in the "ghetto". The insurgents also killed a woman known as "Paulinka", a kapo of the female prisoners in the "lower camp" and a notorious informant. However, their limited supplies of ammunition and grenades were quickly exhausted. Meanwhile, the Germans and guards, recovering from their initial surprise, responded with intense gunfire. The machine gun fire from the watchtowers caused many casualties. Hundreds of prisoners not involved in the uprising began a chaotic escape, with some heading towards the eastern section of the fence, while others fled southeast towards the Totenlager. Along the way, they broke through internal fences using various tools.

The insurgents in the "upper camp" were initially caught off guard by the premature gunfire and did not immediately join the fight. It was only when additional shots and explosions convinced Bloch that the uprising in the "lower camp" was already underway that he gave the signal to start fighting. At the agreed-upon shout, Revolution in Berlin!, the Jews in the prisoner area forced their way through the fence and killed the guard stationed there. The "water carriers" and members of the gravedigger commando also eliminated their assigned guards. During this time, the Oberkapo Singer was likely also killed. The insurgents set fire to some buildings and took control of the guardhouse, where they found some weapons. During the exchange of fire, a guard stationed in the central watchtower of the Totenlager was shot. Soon after, a crowd of prisoners fleeing the "lower camp" surged into the "upper camp". Together with the local prisoners, they began breaching the outer fence. Although the central watchtower in the Totenlager had been neutralized, the guards in the towers along the fence were able to decimate the escaping prisoners with machine gun fire. Nonetheless, many prisoners managed to escape the camp. Bloch and the remaining insurgents, who had acquired firearms, provided covering fire for the escapees until they were either killed or ran out of ammunition.

According to Stangl, the fighting lasted less than 30 minutes. Franciszek Ząbecki recalled that the fire in the camp was not extinguished until around 6:00 PM. After the gunfire ceased, the Germans announced that any Jews who remained in the camp and wanted their protection should immediately report to the square in front of the commandant's office. Reportedly, 105 prisoners responded to this call. Stangl then sent an improvised search party after the escapees.

=== Summary ===
At the time of the uprising, approximately 840 prisoners were in the camp. About 400 managed to escape, while between 350 and 400 Jews were killed during the fighting or while attempting to breach the outer fence. Over 100 prisoners were captured alive by the Germans within the camp; these were individuals who either chose to stay in Treblinka or were unable to flee due to illness and weakness.

The losses sustained by the camp's staff are difficult to determine because the Germans did not produce any official report on the uprising. Yitzhak Arad estimated that from 5 to 6 guards were killed or wounded. Among the German SS men, only Kurt Küttner was injured.

Comparing the course and outcomes of the uprisings in the extermination centers at Treblinka and Sobibor, Arad assessed that the Sobibor insurgents set more modest goals, which increased their chances of success. He also believed that the uprising in Sobibor was better prepared militarily. The Treblinka insurgents failed to take control of the camp and destroy the gas chambers, which allowed the Germans to murder at least 7,500 Jews from the Białystok Ghetto there in the second half of August. Nevertheless, according to Arad, the uprising should be considered successful, if only because it enabled the collective escape of prisoners. In his view, the revolt also hastened the decision to liquidate the camp.

== Fates of the escapees ==
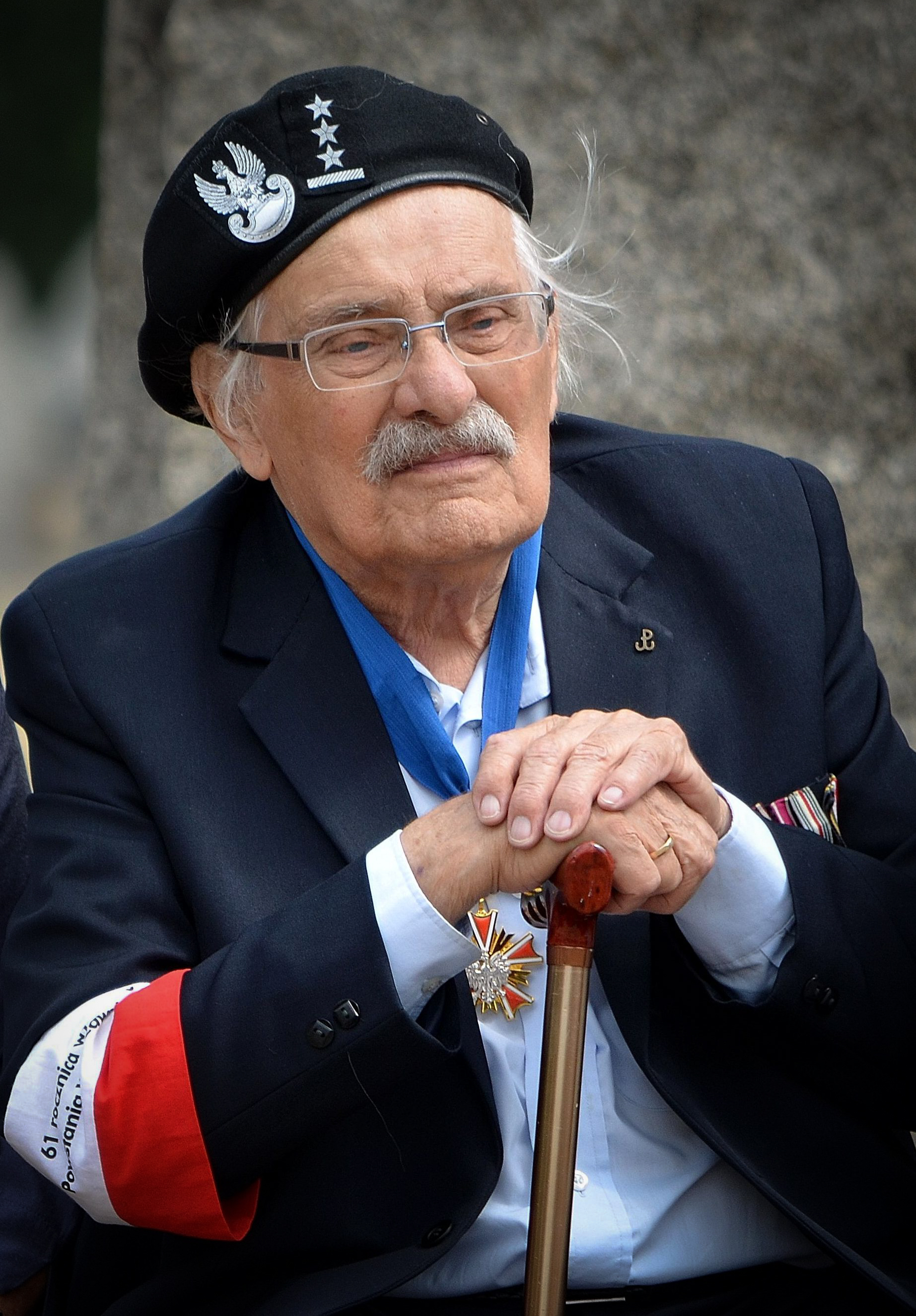
Samuel Willenberg (1923–2016), the last of the participants in the revolt at Treblinka

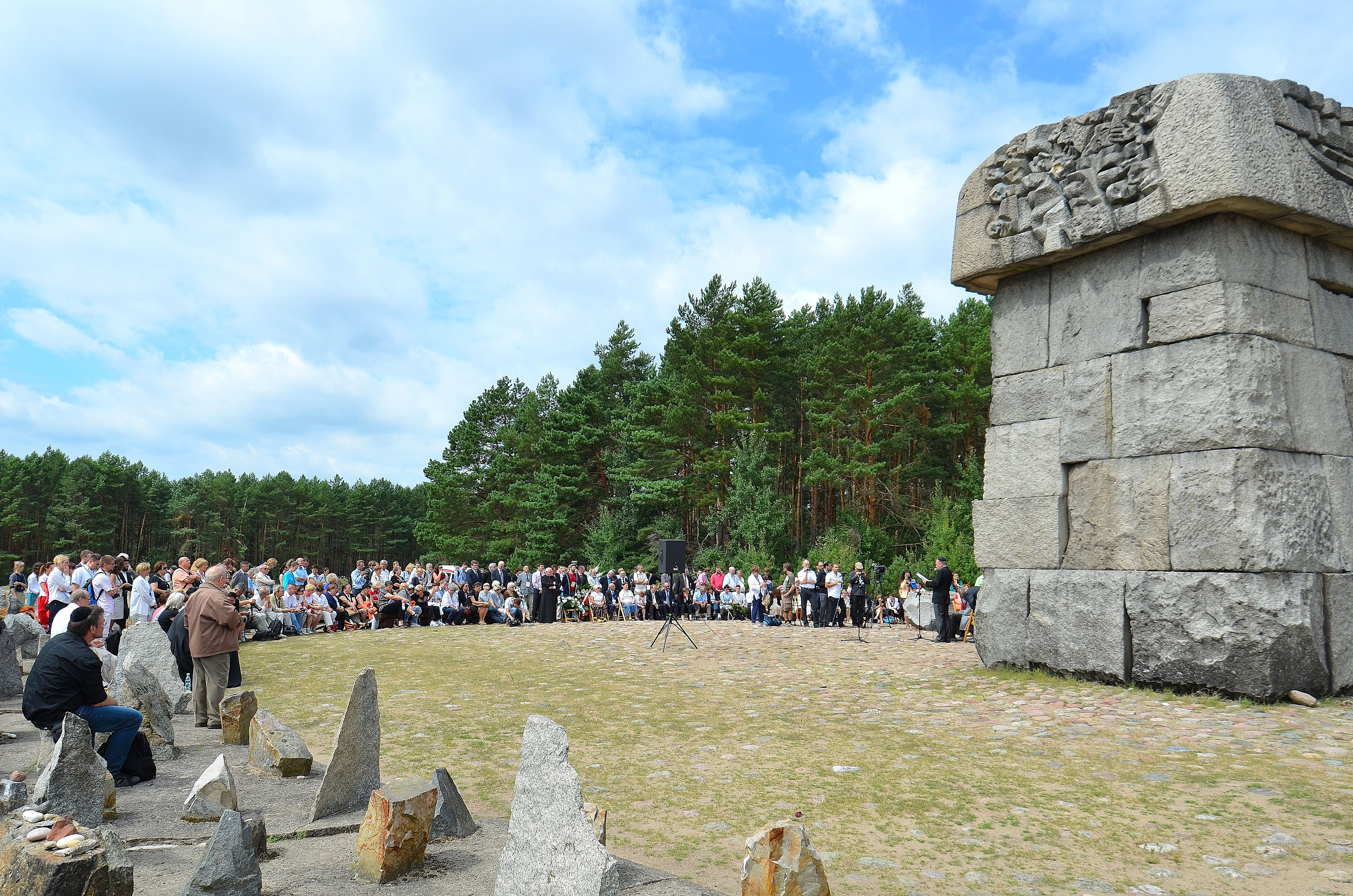
Celebration of the 70th anniversary of the uprising in front of the Treblinka memorial, 2 August 2013

Initially, the escaping Jews fled in large groups, but these quickly dispersed. Franciszek Ząbecki claimed that one group was assisted in crossing the Bug river by a Home Army partisan unit led by Stanisław Siwek, codenamed Śliwa. However, this information is not confirmed by other sources.

The insurgents failed to cut the telephone lines that connected the camp to the outside world, allowing Stangl to quickly summon reinforcements. The first to arrive was the crew from the neighboring labor camp, Treblinka I, followed shortly by a group led by Kurt Franz returning from the Bug river. German posts in Małkinia, Sokołów Podlaski, Kosów Lacki, and Ostrów Mazowiecka were alerted. Units of the SS, police, gendarmerie, and railway guards launched a large-scale manhunt. The camp was surrounded within a five-kilometer radius, roads were blocked, and checkpoints were set up at fords along the Bug. Within the first 24 hours, nearly half of the escapees were captured and murdered. In the following days, approximately 100 more Jews were killed. All the leaders of the uprising were among those killed during the revolt and escape. (Note: Marceli Galewski died during the escape; according to one account, he took poison after becoming exhausted to avoid capture. Želomir Bloch was last seen covering the escape of prisoners from the "upper camp" with rifle fire. There is little information regarding the circumstances of the deaths of the other conspiracy leaders (Arad (1999, pp. 297–298)).)

Around 70 escapees from Treblinka survived the war, including two women. Some found refuge among the Polish population, while others hid in forests until the Red Army's arrival. One escapee, Samuel Rajzman, was hidden and sheltered by a Polish farmer until liberation. In a few cases, escapees were captured and sent to work in the Reich or to concentration camps, where they managed to survive the war. Two Czech Jews, Richard Glazar and Karel Unger, survived by posing as workers for the Organisation Todt and traveling to Germany, where they were liberated by American forces in the spring of 1945.

Many Treblinka escapees managed to survive thanks to assistance from Poles. The most common form of help was providing food, sometimes also offering shelter (either short-term or long-term). In Jewish and Polish accounts analyzed by Teresa Prekerowa, information about altruistic assistance predominates (about 60% of cases). However, testimonies and memories of Treblinka survivors generally depict a negative view of the Polish population's attitude towards the escapees. Many of these accusations are also confirmed by Polish accounts. Based on Jewish testimonies, Yitzhak Arad concluded that the majority of Polish peasants not only did not aid the escaped Jews but, motivated by greed and anti-Semitism, handed them over to the Germans or robbed and murdered them on their own. The residents of the areas surrounding Treblinka, who had profited from trading with the guards, were said to be particularly hostile to the escapees. Arad also concluded that not only the Germans and Polish peasants posed a threat to the escapees but also members of the Home Army and right-wing and fascist factions of the Polish underground.

However, Teresa Prekerowa, after analyzing 27 Jewish and Polish accounts describing the Polish population's attitude towards the Treblinka escapees, pointed out that most negative judgments were not related to specific cases but were based on general assessments. Moreover, only some Jewish authors wrote about their contacts with the Polish population. (Note: Prekerowa (2011, p. 119), referring to Jewish accounts that do not mention contacts with Poles, assessed that from the perspective of the escapees: The abnormal were the one-time, unrepeatable events: escapes, encounters with partisans, attacks, the loss of loved ones. The lack or brevity of information about relations with the local population must therefore indicate that at least some of these relations were good or at least decent, and that such relations were considered "normal".) Therefore, it is difficult to estimate the actual scale of negative phenomena. Polish accounts also suggest that the most common motive for crimes against escapees was not anti-Semitism but greed or neighborhood disputes. Prekerowa also noted that in Jewish accounts, any refusal of help is often interpreted as an act of hostility and anti-Semitism, while objective reasons for the inability to provide assistance (e.g., fear of the Germans or lack of food) are downplayed. She also concluded that the so-called Polish or Soviet partisans attacking the Treblinka escapees might have been common bandits posing as resistance members. In particular, the fact that in memoirs published many years after the war, Jews often do not repeat accusations against the Home Army that appeared in their testimonies given right after liberation may suggest that these accusations were influenced by Stalinist propaganda pressures.

== Aftermath ==
The uprising in Treblinka received significant attention in reports from the Polish Underground State. Both communist and Underground State-associated clandestine press covered the event, and it was also mentioned in periodicals published in London by the Polish government-in-exile. Initially, Polish reports exaggerated the scale of the uprising, estimating the number of escapees at 1,800 and the number of camp staff killed at between 30 and 50. Later accounts provided more accurate information.

The camp's administration and the staff of Operation Reinhard attempted to downplay the rebellion and, if possible, keep it secret. Since no German SS member was killed during the uprising, no official report was prepared for the SS leadership in Berlin. Additionally, Commandant Stangl claimed that all escapees were recaptured within a few hours.

On 19 August 1943, the last transport from the Białystok Ghetto was exterminated in Treblinka. With the nearing end of Operation Reinhard, the Germans soon began the gradual liquidation of the camp. In mid or late August, Stangl, along with part of the staff, was transferred to Trieste. Only a so-called Restkommando, led by Kurt Franz and consisting of a few SS men, a group of guards, and nearly a hundred Jews, (Note: The shortage of prisoners caused by the August uprising was compensated for by transferring a number of Jewish prisoners from the Treblinka I labor camp to Treblinka II (Rusiniak (2008, p. 17)).) remained in Treblinka. Their task was to erase any traces of the camp's existence. Throughout September and October, prisoners dismantled the buildings that had survived the August uprising, along with the fences and guard towers. The mass graves, emptied of bodies, were filled in and sown with lupin. A farm was established on the former camp grounds, where two guards and their families were settled. On October 20, between 30 and 50 prisoners were transferred to the Sobibor extermination camp. Another group was sent on November 4. These prisoners were involved in the liquidation of Sobibor following its uprising and were executed a few weeks later. The last cleanup tasks in Treblinka were assigned to a group of about 30 Jews. On 17 November 1943, in a forest near the camp, Franz and his men shot these prisoners and burned their bodies.

In 1945, General Michał Rola-Żymierski posthumously awarded the leaders of the Treblinka conspiracy, Julian Chorążycki and Marceli Galewski, the Cross of Valour.

Every year on August 2, commemorative ceremonies are held at the site of the former extermination camp to honor the victims of Treblinka.

The last surviving participant in the uprising, Samuel Willenberg, died on 19 February 2016.

== See also ==
- Operation Treblinka

== Bibliography ==
- Arad, Yitzhak (1999). Belzec, Sobibor, Treblinka. The Operation Reinhard Death Camps. Bloomington and Indianapolis: Indiana University Press. ISBN 978-0-253-21305-1.
- Black, Peter (2004). "Prosty żołnierz "akcji Reinhardt". Oddziały z Trawnik i eksterminacja polskich Żydów". In Libionka, Dariusz (ed.). Akcja Reinhardt. Zagłada Żydów w Generalnym Gubernatorstwie (in Polish). Warsaw: Instytut Pamięci Narodowej. ISBN 83-89078-68-6.
- Glazar, Richard (2011). Stacja Treblinka (in Polish). Warsaw: Ośrodek KARTA. ISBN 978-83-61283-52-2.
- Kopówka, Edward (2002). Treblinka – nigdy więcej (in Polish). Siedlce: Muzeum Regionalne w Siedlcach. ISBN 83-88761-15-3.
- Młynarczyk, Jacek Andrzej (2013). "Niemiecki obóz zagłady dla ludności żydowskiej w Treblince". In Kopówka, Edward (ed.). Co wiemy o Treblince? Stan badań (in Polish). Siedlce: Muzeum Regionalne w Siedlcach. ISBN 978-83-88761-38-6.
- Młynarczyk, Jacek Andrzej (2004). "Treblinka – obóz śmierci "akcji Reinhardt"". In Libionka, Dariusz (ed.). Akcja Reinhardt. Zagłada Żydów w Generalnym Gubernatorstwie (in Polish). Warsaw: Instytut Pamięci Narodowej. ISBN 83-89078-68-6.
- Prekerowa, Teresa (2011). "Stosunek ludności polskiej do żydowskich uciekinierów z obozów zagłady w Treblince, Sobiborze i Bełżcu w świetle relacji żydowskich i polskich". In Chodakiewicz, Marek; Muszyński, Wojciech (eds.). Złote serca czy złote żniwa? Studia nad wojennymi losami Polaków i Żydów (in Polish). Warsaw: The Facto. ISBN 978-83-61808-05-3.
- Rajchman, Chil (2011). Ocalałem z Treblinki (in Polish). Warsaw: Czytelnik. ISBN 978-83-07-03252-8.
- Rusiniak, Martyna (2008). Obóz zagłady Treblinka II w pamięci społecznej (1943–1989) (in Polish). Warsaw: Neriton. ISBN 978-83-7543-020-2.
- Sereny, Gitta (2002). W stronę ciemności. Rozmowy z komendantem Treblinki (in Polish). Warsaw: Cyklady. ISBN 83-86859-71-7.
- Webb, Chris; Chocholatý, Michal (2014). The Treblinka death camp. History, Biographies, Remembrance. Stuttgart: ibidem-Verlag. ISBN 978-3-8382-0656-1.
- Weinfeld, Roman (2013). "Jedno tylko życie – Berek Lajcher". Midrasz (in Polish). 3 (173).
- Willenberg, Samuel (2016). Bunt w Treblince (in Polish). Warsaw: Żydowski Instytut Historyczny. ISBN 978-83-65254-40-5.
- Ząbecki, Franciszek (1977). Wspomnienia dawne i nowe (in Polish). Warsaw: Pax.
