= Otto Stadie =

German nurse and holocaust perpetrator (1897–1977)

- Otto Stadie in military uniform
- Born: 10 March 1897; Berlin, Kingdom of Prussia, German Empire
- Died: 28 July 1977 (aged 80); Velbert, North Rhine-Westphalia, West Germany
- Military career
- Allegiance: Nazi Germany
- Branch: Schutzstaffel
- Rank: Unterscharführer Stabsscharführer
- Units: SS-Totenkopfverbände; Treblinka extermination camp

Otto Stadie (10 March 1897 – 28 July 1977) was a German nurse and member of the Action T4, the Nazi forced euthanasia programme. During the Holocaust in occupied Poland he kept the register of stolen gold and diamonds at the Treblinka extermination camp. He was convicted in the first Treblinka trial of 1965.

== SS career ==
Otto Stadie was born in Berlin, where he completed his early schooling and then trained as a nurse in a clinic for venereal disease in the city. During World War I, he served in an infantry medical unit and afterwards worked as a nurse in the Wuhlheide Sanatorium in Berlin. Following the Nazi invasion of Poland at the onset of World War II, he served as combat medic in Germany's Polish and French campaigns.

In 1940, Stadie was assigned to the Führer's headquarters with the Action T4 Nazi euthanasia administration. From there, he was transferred to the Bernburg Euthanasia Centre where the gassing of hospital patients took place in the fake showers. Following Operation Barbarossa he went to the East with Organisation Todt temporarily. Stadie arrived at Treblinka extermination camp in July 1942 at the commencement of the Grossaktion Warsaw resulting in the death of about 265,000 Ghetto inmates prior to the end of September. He remained at Treblinka for eight months with the rank of Sergeant Major. One of his jobs was to meet arriving trains and inform passengers that they would be taken to shower and change into new clothes before boarding a new transport to their work destination the following day. At his trial, Stadie said, "I knew that was a devilish lie but they believed me." Stadie also kept the register of stolen gold and diamonds, as the "right hand" of Kurt Franz and the camp commandant. He supervised the Trawniki men in the same capacity.

Stadie was transferred back to Lublin reservation in July 1943 ahead of the Treblinka prisoner uprising, and in 1944 was sent to Trieste, Italy, where the Risiera di San Sabba killing centre was being set up. He served there as administrative assistant to Franz Stangl. Stadie was captured by the Americans in 1945 and released in Italy as person of no particular interest.

== Trial and conviction ==
Stadie lived in Nordenau resort village in West Germany for the next 20 years and ran a souvenir store. He was arrested in 1965 due to new evidence submitted by the Institute for Contemporary History, and sentenced at Düsseldorf to seven years' imprisonment during the first trial of the former SS men from Treblinka. He died in 1977 at the age of 80.

== See also ==
- Gustav Münzberger, in charge of leading Jews into the gas chambers and gassing them
- Karl Pötzinger, head of the cremation kommando in the Totenlager
- Max Möller (SS officer), ordinance at Camp 2 Auffanglager in Treblinka
