= Willi Mentz =

German Holocaust perpetrator

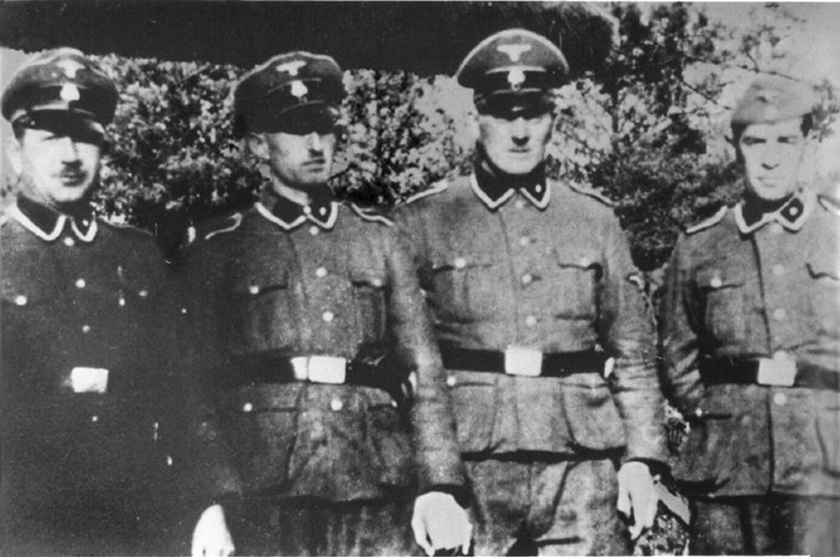
- At the Treblinka extermination camp (left to right): Paul Bredow, Willi Mentz, Max Möller, Josef Hirtreiter
- Born: 30 April 1904; Schönhagen, Kingdom of Prussia, German Empire
- Died: 25 June 1978 (aged 74); Paderborn, North Rhine-Westphalia, West Germany
- Status: Deceased
- Convictions: Murder (25 counts); Accessory to murder (300,000 counts)
- Trial: Treblinka trials
- Penalty: Life imprisonment with hard labour
- Military career
- Allegiance: Nazi Germany
- Branch: Schutzstaffel
- Rank: Unterscharführer
- Unit: SS-Totenkopfverbände
- Commands: Treblinka extermination camp

SS-Unterscharführer Willi Bruno Mentz (30 April 1904 – 25 June 1978) was a member of the German SS in World War II and a Holocaust perpetrator who worked at Treblinka extermination camp during the Operation Reinhard phase of the Holocaust in Poland. Mentz was known as "Frankenstein" at the camp.

== Background ==
Born in Schönhagen near Brandenburg, Mentz joined the NSDAP in 1932. He was a sawmill worker and milkman before joining a police detachment. In 1940, following the outbreak of war, he handled cows and pigs at Grafeneck Euthanasia Centre in the course of Action T4, and in 1941 was transferred to Hadamar gassing facility near Limburg, where he worked in the food garden until early summer 1942. In June–July 1942 Mentz was posted to Treblinka extermination camp and served there until November 1943. He worked at Lazaret killing station at Treblinka II Vernichtungslager and later, at Camp I Arbeitslager as an overseer of the agricultural prisoner-commando (German: Landwirtschaftskommando).

Treblinka II Totenlager, which was built during Operation Reinhard, was operational between 23 July 1942 and 19 October 1943 marking the most deadly phase of the Final Solution. During this time, more than 800,000 Jews; men, women, and children died in its gas chambers. Other estimates of the number killed at Treblinka exceed 1,000,000.

=== The Gunman of Treblinka ===
At Treblinka, Mentz was subordinate to SS-Unterscharführer August Miete. Upon his arrival there, he was tasked by SS-Sturmbannführer Christian Wirth with supervising the hands-on killing of Jews at the so-called Lazaret, a fake infirmary, surrounded by the barbed wire fence where the sick, old, wounded and "difficult" new arrivals were taken directly from the Holocaust trains.

The Lazaret killing station was dressed with the Red Cross flag. Mentz wore an easily recognizable white doctor's smock for deceit. His fresh new victims were taken behind the barracks to the edge of an open excavation seven metres deep, where the corpses of prisoners were smouldering. They were executed while facing the inferno. Mentz shot thousands of Jews through the back of the neck and pushed their bodies into the flames. He was known as "Frankenstein" to the prisoners, one of the most-feared overseers among the work-brigades. According to one source: "The only thing that is certain is that the number of Jews from the transports he killed single-handedly runs into thousands". In December 1943 Mentz was sent for a short time to Sobibor extermination camp.

After Sobibor, Mentz served in Italy during Aktion R (known as the SS Task Force R), i.e. the killing of Jews and partisans there. After 1945, he went back to working as a master milkman in West Germany. He was arrested in 1960. During the first of the Treblinka Trials, Mentz was convicted of aiding and abetting the murders of 25 Jews, and being an accessory to the murders of 300,000 Jews. He was sentenced to life in prison. On 31 March 1978 he was released from prison due to poor health and died on 25 June 1978 in Niedermeien.
