= Ernst Stengelin =

- Born: 10 August 1911; Tuttlingen, Baden-Württemberg, German Empire
- Died: 14 October 1943 (aged 32); Sobibor extermination camp, Lublin Voivodeship, German-occupied Poland
- Military career
- Allegiance: Nazi Germany
- Branch: Schutzstaffel
- Rank: Unterscharführer, SS (Corporal)
- Unit: Sobibor

Ernst Stengelin (10 August 1911 – 14 October 1943) was a German SS-Unterscharführer (Corporal) who served at Treblinka and Sobibor extermination camps and was killed in the Sobibor uprising. Nothing is known about his personal life.

Stengelin served in the killing center at Grafeneck Castle in Grafeneck at Münsingen and the Hadamar Euthanasia Centre, before he was reassigned to the "Aktion Reinhard" extermination camp Treblinka. Then he came to Sobibor shortly before the uprising of the Sobibor extermination camp. He was employed in the camp and was killed by the camp inmates during the uprising. Franz Suchomel reported as the only witness of his death.

== Bibliography ==
- Barbara Distel: Sobibor. S. 376 ff. In: Wolfgang Benz, Barbara Diestel: Der Ort des Terrors. Geschichte der nationalsozialistischen Konzentrationslager. 8.Bd. Beck. München 2008. ISBN 3-406-57237-5
- Jules Schelvis: Vernichtungslager Sobibór. Unrast-Verlag. Hamburg/Münster 2003. ISBN 3-89771-814-6
- Ernst Klee: Das Kulturlexikon zum Dritten Reich. Wer war was vor und nach 1945. S. Fischer, Frankfurt am Main 2007, ISBN 978-3-10-039326-5, p. 591.
