= Max Möller (SS officer) =

Holocaust perpetrator

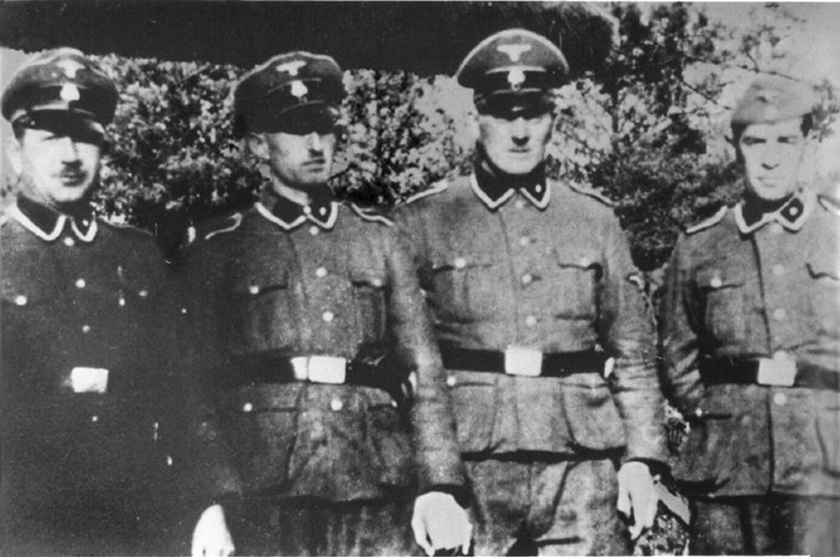
- Treblinka staff (left to right): Paul Bredow, Willi Mentz, Max Möller, Josef Hirtreiter
- Military career
- Allegiance: Nazi Germany
- Branch: Schutzstaffel
- Rank: Unterscharführer, SS
- Nickname: Amerikaner
- Unit: SS-Totenkopfverbände
- Commands: Treblinka extermination camp

Max Möller was an SS functionary in Nazi Germany and a Holocaust perpetrator. He worked at the Treblinka extermination camp during the Operation Reinhard phase of the Holocaust in Poland.

Originally from Hamburg, Max Möller belonged to a police detachment before his service at Treblinka. He worked as ordinance in Camp 2 Auffanglager "undressing yard", nicknamed "Amerikaner" (or, the American) by the prisoners because of his massive build. Survivors of the prisoner uprising testified that Möller along with Feodor Fedorenko were helping August Miete at the Lazaret killing station where Jews were being shot point-blank upon arrival at the camp.

Möller became a notable figure ahead of the prisoner uprising, because he watched over the German armoury and had to be tricked before the weapons could be stolen from it. Prisoner Sadovits told Möller that he was needed in the potato-workers team due to labor problems there. They left the barracks together, allowing the insurgents to begin removing the weapons. After the closing of the camp, he was assigned to Trieste region in Italy by the SS. After the war he disappeared and no further details are known about him.
