= Treblinka trials =

Trials related to the personnel of the Treblinka extermination camp that began in 1964

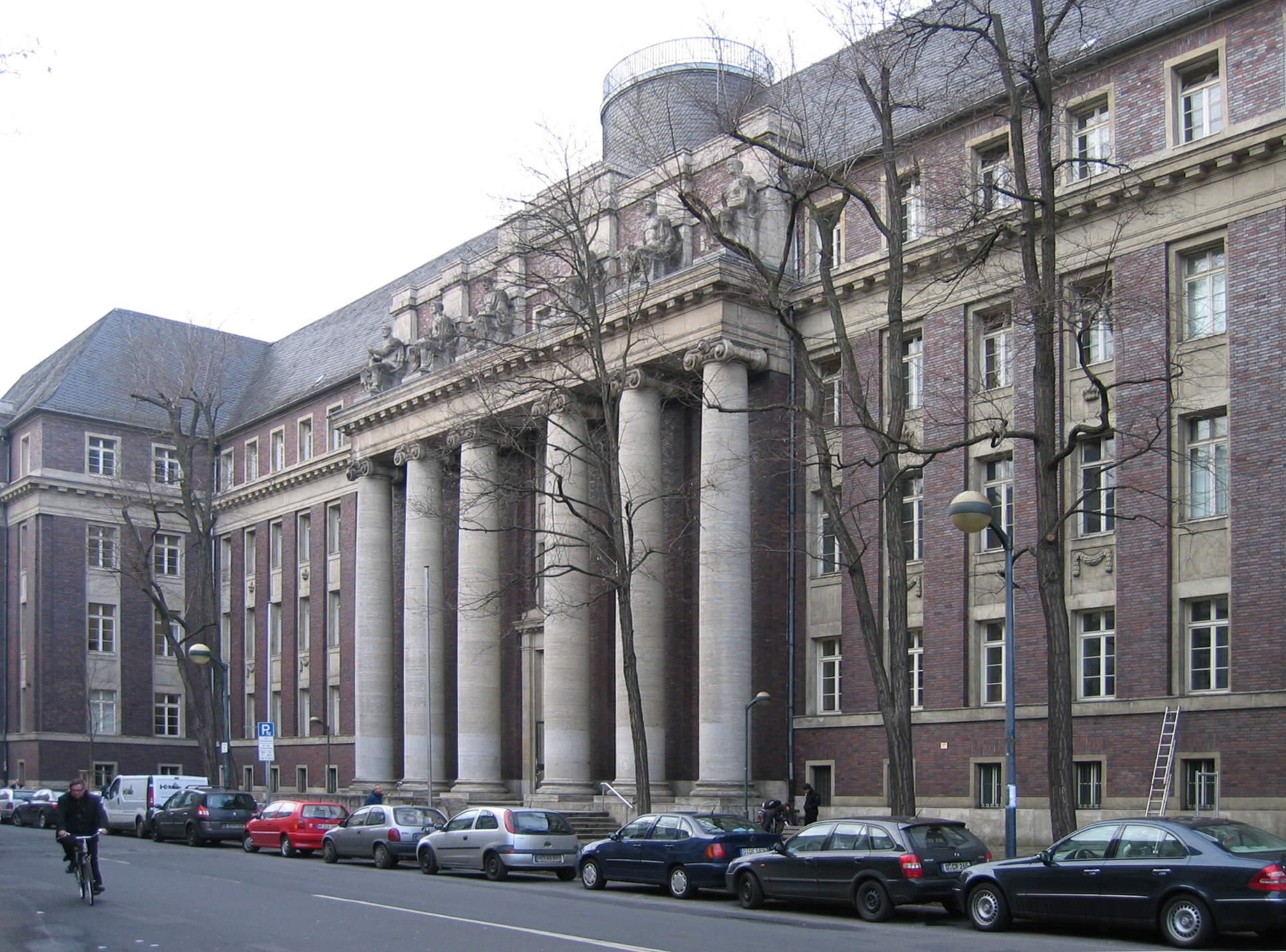
Düsseldorf District Court (Land- und Amtsgericht Düsseldorf). Trial location, 2008 photo.

The two Treblinka trials concerning the Treblinka extermination camp personnel began in 1964. Held at Düsseldorf in West Germany, they were the two judicial trials in a series of similar war crime trials held during the early 1960s, such as the Jerusalem Adolf Eichmann trial (1961) and the Frankfurt Auschwitz trials (1963–65), as a result of which the general public came to realize the extent of the crimes that some two decades earlier had been perpetrated in occupied Poland by German bureaucrats and their willing executioners. In the subsequent years, separate trials dealt with personnel of the Bełżec (1963–65), Sobibor (1966), and Majdanek (1975–81) extermination camps.

== Hirtreiter trial ==
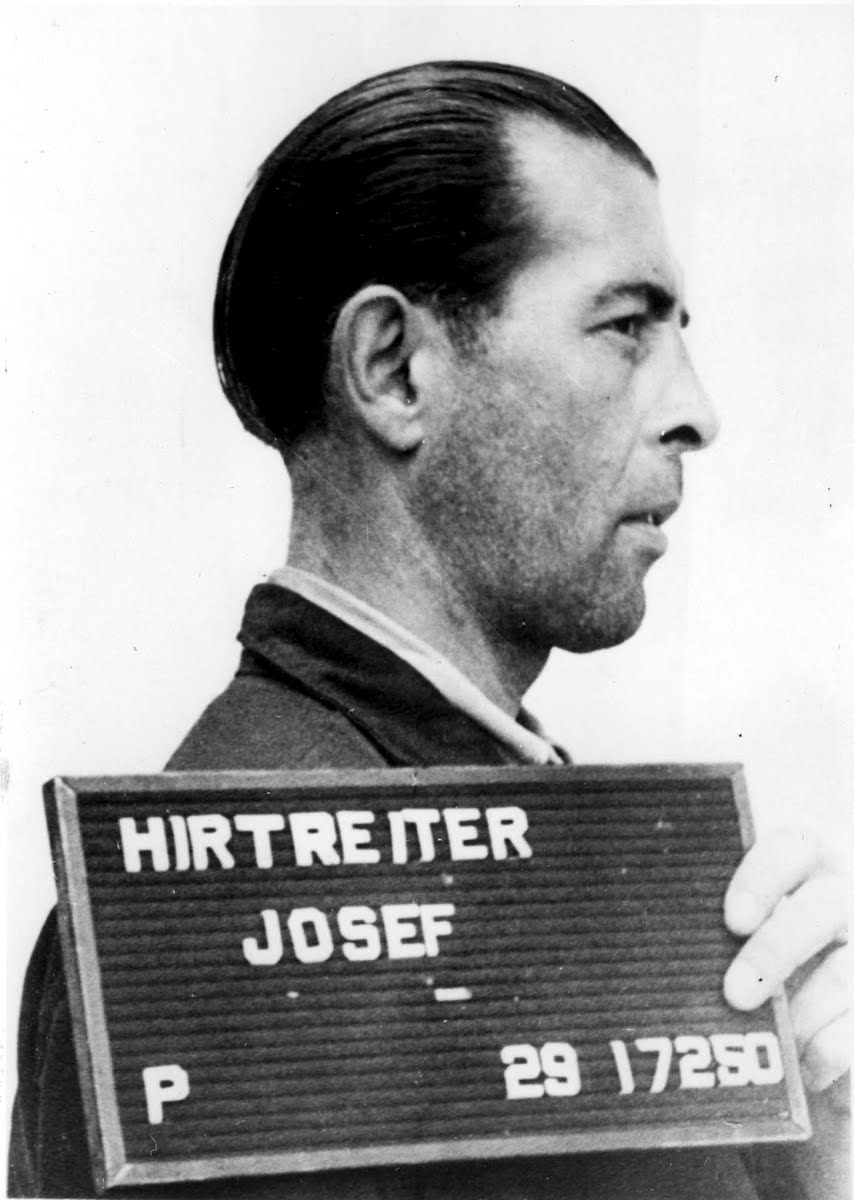
Josef Hirtreiter 1946 mugshot

In 1946 Josef Hirtreiter was arrested in the course of the Allied investigations into the killing of disabled persons in the Hadamar killing centre. Although not focused on Treblinka from the beginning, and not serving as a lead-in to the later Treblinka trials, the Hirtreiter trial is viewed by some historians as being part of these. Hirtreiter could not be shown to have been criminally involved at Hadamar; however, he did confess to having worked in a camp near the Polish village of Małkinia where Jews were killed in a gas chamber. Further investigations showed that Hirtreiter had been stationed at the Treblinka extermination camp, where he supervised the victims' disrobing prior to their gassing. He was charged with participation in the mass-murder of Jews, particularly the killing of more than 10 persons, including infants. On 3 March 1951 Hirtreiter was sentenced to life in prison. He was released on health grounds in 1977, and died in 1978.

== First Treblinka trial ==
The crimes committed in the General Government territory of occupied Poland were investigated by the Central Agency from July 1959 by the German specialist in the Nazi prosecution Dietrich Zeug, present at the Eichmann trial. His inquiry led to the first arrest of Treblinka deputy commandant on 2 December 1959. Zeug received survivor testimonies from Yad Vashem which allowed him to examine German national archives for more clues. He was the first to establish the chain of command for Operation Reinhard.

The first Treblinka trial began on 12 October 1964 and concerned eleven members of the SS camp personnel, or about a quarter of the total number of SS employed in the extermination of Jews brought aboard Holocaust trains to Treblinka. More than 100 witnesses were called, with incriminating evidence presented by Franciszek Ząbecki, a dispatcher employed by the Reichsbahn during the Holocaust train departures from across occupied Poland, proven by original German waybills he collected. The verdicts were pronounced on 3 September 1965:

Defendants	Photograph	Rank	Function	Sentence	Outcome
Kurt Franz		SS-Untersturmführer	Deputy commandant	Life imprisonment	Released in 1993; died in 1998
Otto Richard Horn		SS-Unterscharführer	Totenlager – Corpse detail	Acquitted	Died in 1999
Erwin Lambert		SS-Unterscharführer	Built Large Gas Chambers	4 years imprisonment	Died in 1976
Heinrich Matthes		SS-Scharführer	Chief of Totenlager	Life imprisonment	Died in prison in 1978
Willi Mentz		SS-Unterscharführer	Lazarett ("Infirmary", which actually meant shooting victims)	Life imprisonment	Released in 1978 and died 3 months later
August Miete		SS-Unterscharführer	Lazarett – "Angel of Death"	Life imprisonment	Released in 1985; died in 1987
Gustav Münzberger		SS-Unterscharführer	Totenlager – Gas Chambers	12 years imprisonment	Released in 1971; died in 1977
Albert Rum		SS-Unterscharführer	Totenlager – Gas Chambers	3 years imprisonment	Died in 1970
Otto Stadie		SS-Stabsscharführer	Camp Administration	6 years imprisonment	Released in 1965; died in 1977
Franz Suchomel		SS-Unterscharführer	Gold and Valuables	7 years imprisonment	Released in 1967; died in 1979
Kurt Küttner		SS-Oberscharführer	Lower camp of Treblinka II	Arrested/Charged but Died before trial	Died 1964

== Second Treblinka trial ==
The second Treblinka trial also known as the Stangl trial, was held from 13 May to 22 December 1970, five years after the first group trial for war crimes. In this trial, camp commandant Franz Stangl, expelled three years earlier from Brazil, finally stood accused. Stangl had previously assisted in killing handicapped people during Aktion T4 (the Nazi "euthanasia" programme), and, before moving on to Treblinka, had been the first commandant of Sobibor. Under his supervision, most of the Treblinka killings took place. He was sentenced to life imprisonment, and died in prison on 28 June 1971, during the appeal case.

== See also ==
- Belsen trial in 1945 of the SS functionaries from Auschwitz and Bergen-Belsen
- Belzec trial in the mid-1960s of eight former SS members of Belzec extermination camp
- Chełmno trials of the Chełmno extermination camp personnel, held in Poland and in Germany. The cases were decided almost twenty years apart
- Dachau trials held within the walls of the former Dachau concentration camp, 1945–1948
- Euthanasia trials, an overview of trials dealing specifically with the associated Nazi euthanasia programme
- Majdanek trials, the longest Nazi war crimes trial in history, spanning over 30 years
- Mauthausen-Gusen camp trials
- Nuremberg trials of the 23 most important leaders of the Third Reich, 1945–1946
- Hamburg Ravensbrück trials
- Sobibor trial held in Hagen, Germany in 1965 against the SS-men of the Sobibor extermination camp
- Ivan the Terrible (Treblinka guard), notorious Treblinka guard not brought to trial. In the 1970s–80s John Demjanjuk was accused of being Ivan and brought to trial in 1986, but eventually it was established that he was not the same person.
- Samuel Rajzman, witness at the trials
