= Rudolf Masarek =

Nazi extermination camp escape leader and Holocaust victim (1913–1943)

Rudolf Masarek (Masaryk)
- Photo of Rudolf Masarek, taken before the outbreak of the Second World War in Prague, Czechoslovakia
- Born: Rudolf Masarek; September 10, 1913; Prague, Czechoslovakia
- Died: August 2, 1943 (aged 29); Treblinka, Poland
- Cause of death: Killed during Treblinka Prisoner Uprising
- Other name: Rudi
- Occupation: Army lieutenant
- Known for: Treblinka Prisoner Uprising

Rudolf (Rudi) Masarek (or Masaryk) (10 September 1913 – 2 August 1943) was a Czech prisoner of the Treblinka extermination camp and a prominent member of the Treblinka prisoner uprising. Deported from the Theresienstadt concentration camp to Treblinka on 8 October 1942, Masarek was killed during that camp's prisoner uprising on 2 August 1943.

== Early life ==
Masarek was born into an affluent Czech family of tailors. According to the account of Treblinka survivor Richard Glazar, Masarek had been a lieutenant in the Czechoslovak Army before the outbreak of the Second World War in 1939. Regarding Masarek's early life, Glazar comments that "Rudi was a sort of ‘golden youth’. His had been the world of sports-cars, tennis, country-house weekends, summers on the Riviera."

Fellow Treblinka prisoner Chil Raichman wrote in his memoir that Masarek was a nephew of former Czech President Masarek.

Accounts are divided as to whether Masarek himself was Jewish. According to one account, he was a "half-Jew", although others state that he was not Jewish at all. In 1938, after the Austrian Anschluss, he had fallen in love with a girl from Vienna who was Jewish; according to other reports, though not a Jew himself, he chose to follow his Jewish wife to the Theresienstadt concentration camp and later to Treblinka.

== Deportation to Treblinka ==
Masarek was relocated from his home in German-occupied Prague to the Theresienstadt concentration camp on 10 August 1942. From there he was deported to the Treblinka extermination camp on 8 October 1942, where between 870,000 and 925,000 European Jews were murdered. His pregnant wife was murdered in Treblinka's gas chambers upon arrival at the camp. Masarek, on the other hand, was selected by the SS for the small Jewish manual labor force assembled to maintain the camp.

According to survivor accounts, the blond Masarek was noticed for his physique and "Nordic" appearance upon arrival at Treblinka. Glazar writes, "He has a narrow face, light skin, blond hair cut short, bright blue eyes, the chest and shoulders of a fencer. At the disrobing site his physical appearance had set him apart so dramatically that they couldn't help but pick him out."

== Imprisonment at Treblinka ==
At Treblinka, Masarek was first ordered to work in the work units sorting clothing from transports. Later, he was transferred to Treblinka's tailor shop. Glazar noted that "Rudi's Aryan build and athletic posture caught the attention of the fashionable and sadistic Master Sergeant Kurt Franz." Masarek's tailoring experience was also partly responsible for his transfer.

Eventually, the SS gave Masarek the position of Hofjude (literally "court Jew"), a slightly more privileged group of craftsmen prisoners who were used to maintain specific areas of the camp. There, he was ordered to tend to Barry, Kurt Franz' dog. Glazar reports that "[Kurt Franz] assigned our Rudi the task of overseeing all of Treblinka's animal population."

Despite the somewhat special treatment granted to Masarek in Treblinka, survivor accounts reveal Masarek's disturbed emotional health after learning of the deaths of his wife and unborn child. Glazar writes, "[a]nd what about our Rudi? He had family on the other side. Always talked about how she had been pregnant and how much he loved her." Masarek attempted suicide twice.

Glazar also implies that Masarek, along with others whose families were murdered upon arrival at Treblinka, had "no intention of escaping" the camp on the day of the uprising on 2 August 1943.

== Treblinka prisoner uprising ==
Much like the subsequent Sobibor extermination camp uprising, a group of Treblinka inmates planned and successfully staged an uprising and escape into the nearby forests. The uprising occurred on 2 August 1943.

Masarek assumed an integral military role in the preparations and execution of the uprising. During the uprising, Jewish inmates used SS weaponry to stave off the SS and Ukrainian guards' counterattack while prisoners broke through the camp's fences. In the process, the inmates set many of Treblinka's wooden buildings on fire. According to one account, Masarek was witnessed shooting SS officers from a roof, shouting: "This is for my wife and my child who never saw the world!" Masarek died in Treblinka on the day of the uprising.

Treblinka survivor Chil Rajchman described running from Treblinka in the moments after the uprising in a group that included Masarek. Hiding in a wooded area, Rajchman recalled that Masarek slit his wrists as soldiers entered the area. The soldiers left without noticing the escaped prisoners, and Rajchman bound Masarek's wounds. Later that night, Masarek used his military training to navigate the group using the stars. After two weeks in the forest, Rajchman left the group to attempt to travel alone to Warsaw.

In the months following the uprising, Nazi authorities issued Sonderaktion 1005, the code name for the Nazis' efforts to remove evidence of genocide and other atrocities. As part of the effort, the Nazis dismantled Treblinka's buildings and leveled its grounds.

No further information about the fate of Masarek's other family members has been found.

== See also ==
- Kurt Franz
- Treblinka extermination camp
- Aktion Reinhard
- Sonderaktion 1005
- Theresienstadt concentration camp
- List of individuals responsible for Treblinka extermination camp
