= Łyszkowice, Łowicz County =

Łyszkowice
- Village
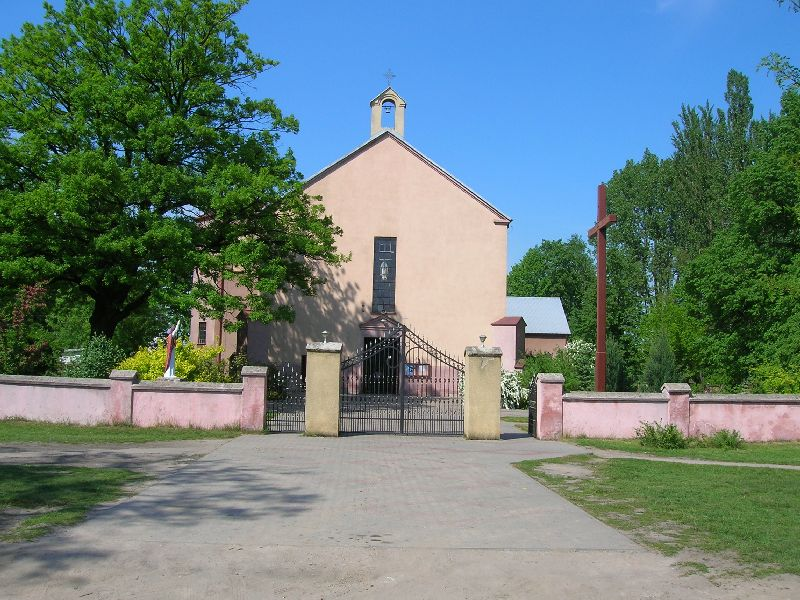
- Church in Łyszkowice

- Location within Poland
- Coordinates: 51°59′N 19°55′E
- Country: Poland
- Voivodeship: Łódź
- County: Łowicz
- Gmina: Łyszkowice
- Population: 1,100

Łyszkowice [wɨʂkɔˈvit͡sɛ] is a village in Łowicz County, Łódź Voivodeship, in central Poland. It is the seat of the gmina (administrative district) called Gmina Łyszkowice.

== Notable individuals ==
Łyszkowice is a place of birth of the World War II member of Armia Krajowa, Holocaust resistor and author Franciszek Ząbecki who testified at the trials of German war criminals Kurt Franz and the commandant of Treblinka extermination camp, Franz Stangl. Ząbecki proved that the "Güterwagen" boxcars crammed with Jewish prisoners on the way to Treblinka, were returning empty.
