= Kurt Küttner =

Nazi Germany military officer (1907–1950)

- Kurt Küttner
- Born: 15 January 1907
- Died: 31 December 1950 (aged 43)
- Military career
- Allegiance: Nazi Germany
- Branch: Schutzstaffel
- Rank: SS-Oberscharführer (Staff Sergeant)
- Nickname: Kiwe (Yiddish)
- Commands: Lower camp of Treblinka

Kurt Küttner (15 January 1907 - 31 December 1950) was an SS-Oberscharführer (Staff Sergeant) who served at Treblinka extermination camp, arrested and charged with war crimes at the Treblinka trials years after the war ended.

== Career ==
Before World War II, Kurt (Fritz) Küttner worked for many years as a warden in the German police. During Operation Reinhard in occupied Poland he was in charge of the lower camp of Treblinka II Totenlager, where he became one of the most feared and hated SS officers. He would follow people around, stop them and search for money, pictures or any family mementos that the prisoners would try to hide on their person. If he caught someone carrying anything, he would beat the prisoner cruelly and send him to the Lazarett, or infirmary, where the prisoner was killed. In his capacity as commander of the Lower Camp and over the Jewish prisoners, he wanted to know exactly what was going on throughout his jurisdiction. He therefore exploited the weakness or baseness of some of the prisoners and turned them into informers. He received the nickname "Kiwe" from the prisoners.

Küttner ordered the worker Jews (Arbeitskommando) who worked in the Lazarett of his lower camp to wear armbands bearing the red cross emblem, so as to deceive the true nature of the "infirmary" as a killing station.

As recalled by SS-Unterscharführer (Corporal) Franz Suchomel:

From one of the transports that arrived in October 1942, Küttner removed ten or twelve young boys and put them to work at various service tasks in the camp. One of the boys he appointed capo [sic] of the group. After about three weeks, the boy was caught giving gold coins to one of the Ukrainians, and Küttner had him, along with all the other boys in the group, taken to the gas chambers.

Küttner was also in charge of whipping prisoners at the evening roll call. Samuel Willenberg, one of the prisoners at Treblinka, recounts how this went:

When we had finished our rendition, Kiwe recited the numbers of the prisoners due for lashing on their naked posteriors that day. Each such prisoner would be tied to the stool and given twenty-five lashes with a whip as he [Küttner] counted the blows aloud.

After Operation Reinhard ended Küttner also served in the SS in Italy. After the war, Küttner, along with ten other former SS officers from Treblinka, was arrested and charged at the Treblinka trials, but he died in 1950 before the trial began.
