= Samuel Rajzman =

Polish-Jewish Holocaust survivor (1902–1979)

Samuel Rajzman (born Szmul Rajzman; 1902–1979) was a Polish-Jewish Holocaust survivor. He was a key organizer and participant in the August 1943 prisoner uprising at the Treblinka extermination camp, and one of the few surviving camp escapees. After the war, he emigrated to France and then to Canada. He was the only Treblinka survivor to testify at the Nuremberg Trials, and later provided critical testimony at the Treblinka trials (1964–1970) and during the deportation hearings of Feodor Fedorenko.

== Biography ==
Szmul Rajzman was born into a Jewish family and lived with his wife and children in Węgrów, where he was an accountant and translator. After the German invasion of Poland, together with his family he was resettled and imprisoned in the Warsaw Ghetto.

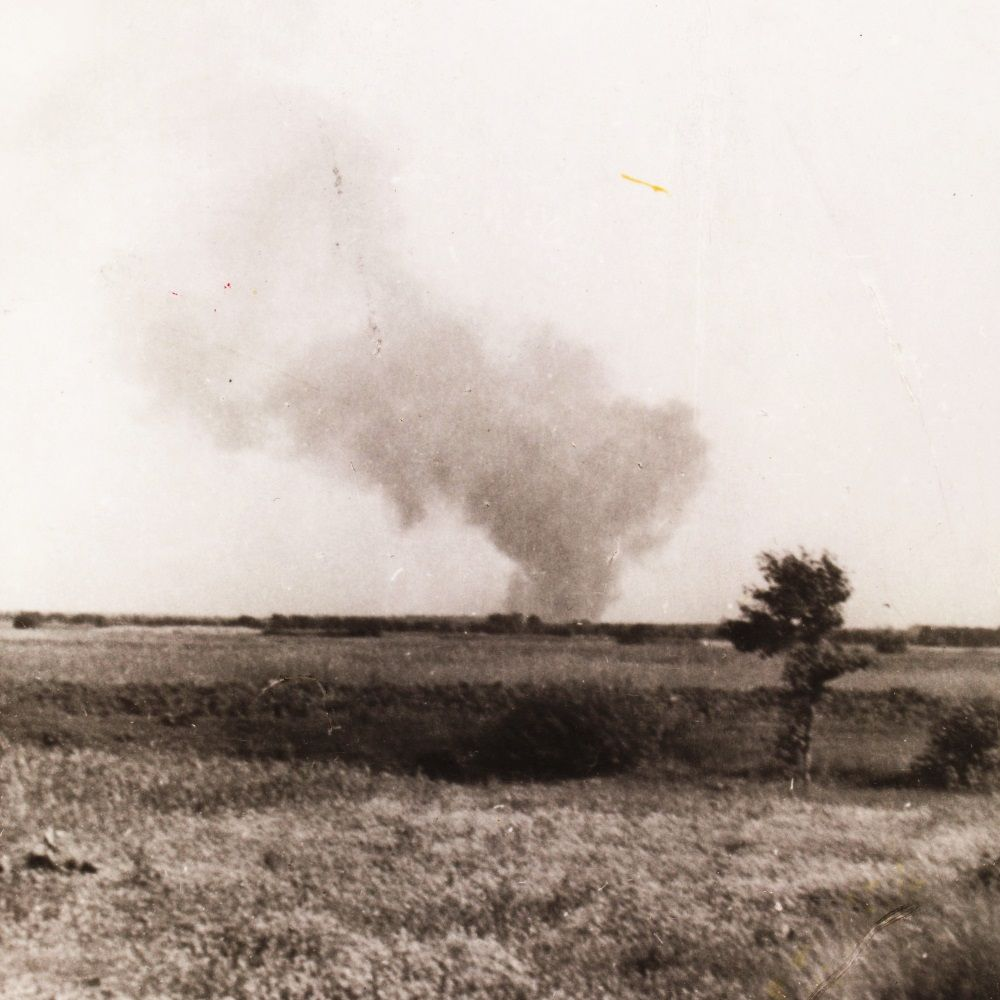
Burning perimeter of Treblinka camp during the prisoner uprising of 2 August 1943 in which Rajzman took part. A clandestine photograph taken by eyewitness Franciszek Ząbecki.

In September 1942 he was transferred to the Treblinka extermination camp. He was saved from immediate execution that befell most of those from his transport group by an acquaintance, Marceli Galewski and moved to work in the Sonderkommando; he was also enlisted in the resistance organization. The resistance organization eventually succeeded in organizing the Treblinka uprising on 2 August 1943. Rajzman was one of the few survivors from that incident; familiar with the nearby area, he was sheltered, together with another escapee, by local farmer Edward Gołoś, a pre-war acquaintance of Rajzman, and survived the war. Gołoś was later recognized as one of the Polish Righteous Among the Nations.

After the war (which his family did not survive) he moved to France, and later to Canada, where he remarried.

On 27 February 1946, Rajzman testified about his experiences in Treblinka at the Nuremberg Trials as one of the three Jews and two Polish witnesses during the proceedings (the other Polish witness being Seweryna Szmaglewska). He was also a witness in both of the Treblinka trials (the first was the 1964–1965 trial of members of the German crew of Treblinka, and at second one, in 1969–1970, the trial of the commandant, Franz Stangl). In 1978 his testimony also contributed to the stripping of Fiodor Fedorenko’s American citizenship (Fedorenko was a Ukrainian guard at Treblinka; he was eventually deported to the USSR and executed there).

Rajzman died in Montreal in 1979.
