= Franciszek Ząbecki =

Polish resistance member and Holocaust witness

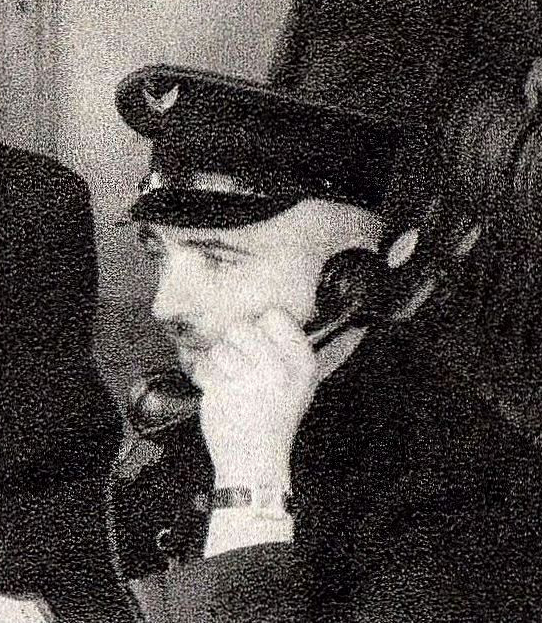
- Ząbecki at Treblinka train station, c. 1942–1944
- Born: 8 October 1907; Łyszkowice
- Died: 11 April 1987 (aged 79)
- Occupation: Station master
- Known for: Holocaust reporting and member of the Home Army.

Lieutenant Franciszek Ząbecki (Polish pronunciation: [fraɲˈt͡ɕiʂɛɡ zɔmˈbɛt͡skʲi]; 8 October 1907 – 11 April 1987) was a station master at the village of Treblinka. During the German occupation of Poland in World War II, Ząbecki worked as a dispatcher for the Deutsche Reichsbahn; he also became a secret soldier in the underground Armia Krajowa (AK), collecting classified data and reporting to the Polish resistance on the Holocaust transports that went to Treblinka extermination camp. Over 800,000 Jews were murdered there in the course of Operation Reinhard, the deadliest phase of the Holocaust in Poland. Ząbecki himself estimated that number to be 1,200,000 people.

After the war, Ząbecki testified at the trials of German war criminals, including SS officer Kurt Franz, and the commandant of Treblinka extermination camp, Franz Stangl. His incriminating evidence against them included original German waybills produced by the Reichsbahn, which proved that the "Güterwagen" boxcars crammed with prisoners on the way to Treblinka were returning empty. Ząbecki secretly stole a batch of waybills in 1944 from the control house to serve as physical proof of the massacre. From July 1942 until the end of war, Ząbecki regularly delivered his reports about the Holocaust trains to the Polish government-in-exile.

== Life ==
Franciszek Ząbecki was born in Łyszkowice to Rozalia and Franciszek Ząbecki, as one of their four children. After graduation, he worked for the railway between 29 September 1925 and 15 October 1929 in Bednary near Łowicz, first as an apprentice and then as the radiotelegraph operator. Ząbecki was drafted to serve at Zegrze Fortress from 15 October 1929 until 1 September 1931. Soon later, he relocated to Sokołów Podlaski, where his older brother Grzegorz worked at a sugar refinery. Franciszek found employment as a tax collector and got to know the locals.

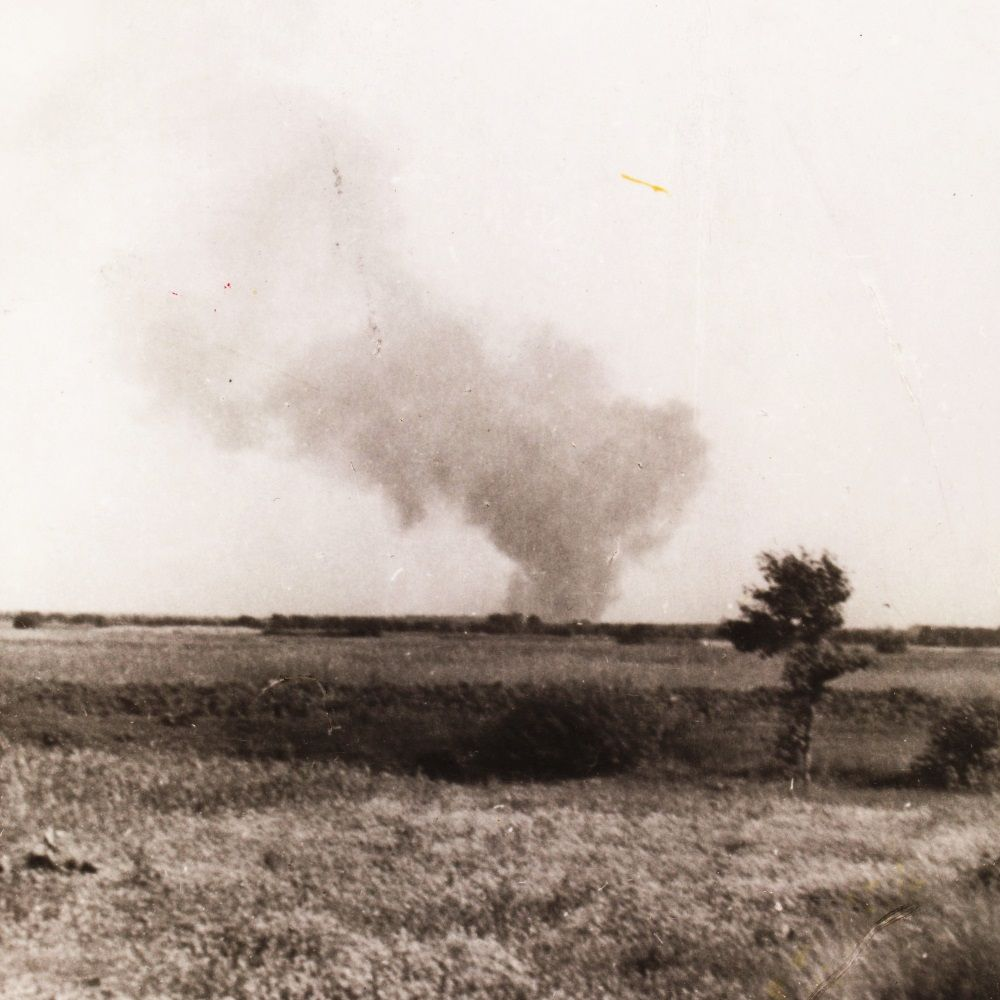
Burning perimeter of Treblinka camp during the prisoner uprising of 2 August 1943. A clandestine photograph taken by Ząbecki.

On 4 September 1939, during the German invasion of Poland he reported to the Communication Battalion of the Polish Army in Zegrze as the reserve platoon-leader (plutonowy). Two weeks later, on the first day of the parallel Soviet invasion of Poland from the east, he was arrested in the village of Kołodno near Zbaraż and shipped to a Soviet POW camp. After two months, on 13 November 1939 Ząbecki was transferred to German jurisdiction in accordance with the Nazi-Soviet pact. He was sent to Parchim in Germany where he worked as a slave laborer on a farm in Klinken. He was released on 29 March 1941 for medical reasons and returned to Sokołów. Being a railwayman from before the invasion, he was put to work at the nearby Treblinka station on 22 May 1941. There he secretly joined the resistance under the nom-de-guerre "Dawny" (the old-timer in Polish) and was asked by the Armia Krajowa (AK) to keep a watch on the German rail transports passing through the station. This intelligence became crucial following the German attack on Russian positions in occupied eastern Poland. Soon afterwards, Ząbecki was given the task of spying on the secretive Treblinka extermination camp for the AK. He kept cryptic notes with daily records of the extermination transports and also took the clandestine photograph of the burning Treblinka-II perimeter during the prisoner uprising.

Ząbecki was present at Treblinka for the first Holocaust train arrival from the German-occupied capital of Poland during the Grossaktion Warsaw, commencing the final destruction of at least 254,000 Jews from the Warsaw Ghetto. He was one of only a few non-German witnesses of all Jewish transports thereafter, until the liquidation of the Treblinka death camp, with the last Jewish forced laborers sent to be murdered at the Sobibor extermination camp in five covered wagons on 20 October 1943.

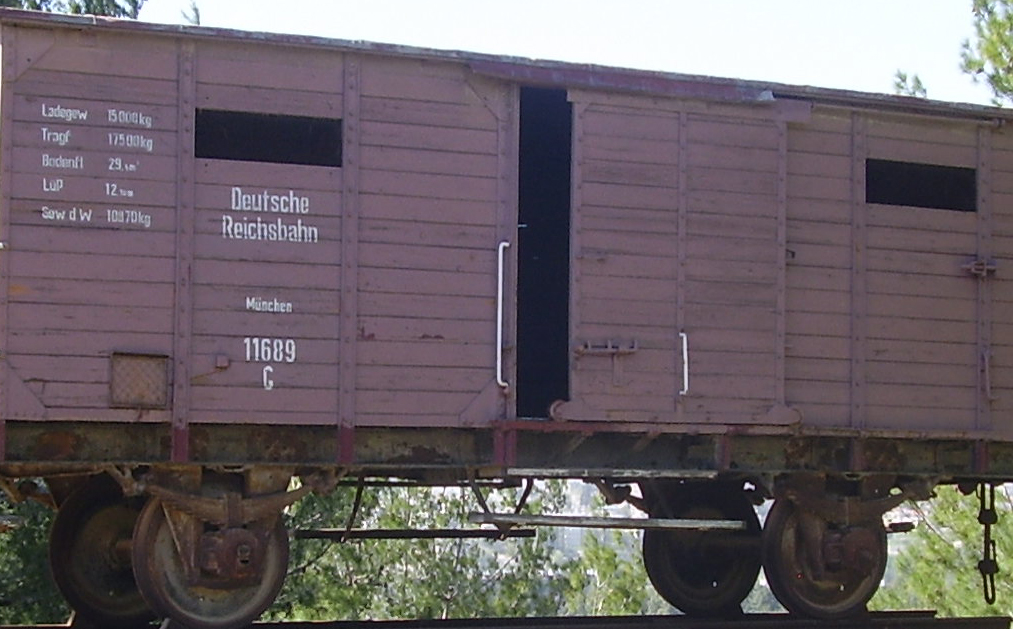
The Holocaust "Güterwagen" boxcar holding an average of 100 victims "deported" throughout occupied Poland

== Memoir published in 1977 ==
As a former member of the Polish resistance movement in World War II, Ząbecki published a groundbreaking book in 1977 about his wartime experiences, containing original documents, his own Treblinka findings, as well as his postwar testimonies delivered at the Treblinka war-crime trials in Düsseldorf in 1965, 1966, 1968 and 1970, which he attended at the request of the German prosecutors.

In his book of facts about the camp history titled Wspomnienia dawne i nowe (Old and New Memories), Ząbecki estimated that no fewer than 1,200,000 people were murdered at Treblinka. Even though these estimates have been revised by others in the following decades, his book is still one of the leading sources of information for professional historians about the mass deportations to Treblinka from the Jewish ghettos in German-occupied Poland, their frequency, and volume.

== Documentary film ==
Ząbecki was the subject of a documentary film made by WWFD Czołówka from Warsaw, the People's Army film division. It was popularized in schools and community centres around Poland during the German trial of Holocaust perpetrator Franz Stangl. Notably, when Ząbecki went to Düsseldorf to testify against him, he was offered a good life in the West by the defense attorneys in case he chose to defect. He declined the offer, and instead fully incriminated Stangl. He knew him personally from his visits at the extermination camp layover yard.

During the war, Ząbecki secretly watched the railway line from Siedlce to Małkinia Górna junction, which was shown in the film together with his clandestine work for the underground, and his daily recording of data. It was thanks to Ząbecki, that the scale of mass murder became known long before more advanced historical research was conducted in the following decades.
