= August Miete =

SS officer

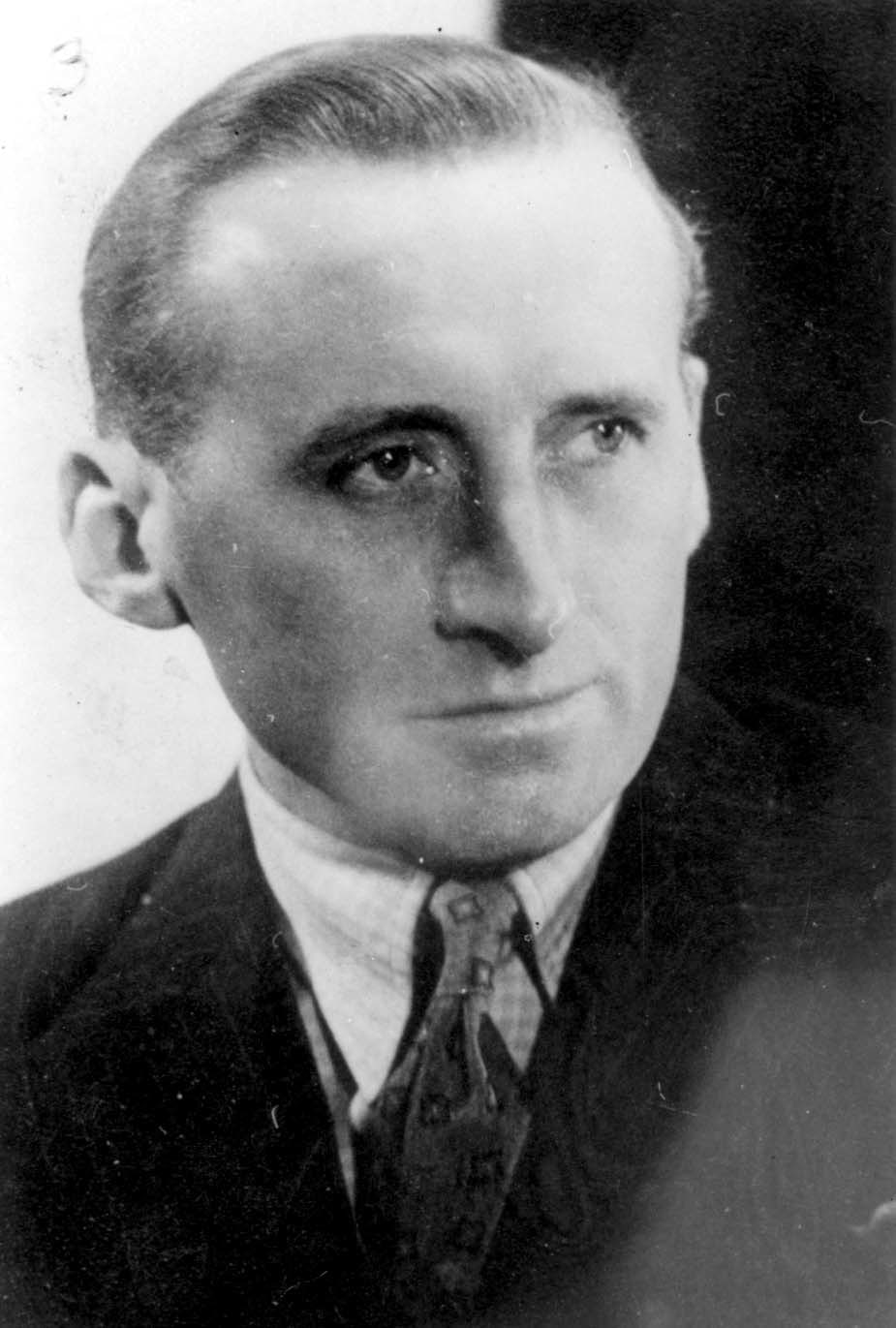
- Born: 1 November 1908; Westerkappeln, German Empire
- Died: 9 August 1987 (aged 78); Osnabrück, West Germany
- Military career
- Allegiance: Nazi Germany
- Branch: Schutzstaffel
- Rank: Scharführer
- Nickname: Angel of Death (Yiddish: Malakh Ha-Moves)
- Unit: SS-Totenkopfverbände

August Wilhelm Miete (born 1 November 1908 – 9 August 1987) was an SS functionary of Nazi Germany. He worked at the Grafeneck and Hadamar Euthanasia Centres, and then at Treblinka extermination camp. Miete was arrested in 1960 and tried in West Germany for participating in the mass murder of at least 300,000 people; in 1965, he was found guilty and sentenced to the maximum penalty, life imprisonment.

== SS career ==
Miete was born in 1908 in Westerkappeln of the German Empire, the son of a miller and farmer. Miete completed elementary school before his father died in 1921. Together with his brother, Miete worked on the family farm and as a grinder in the flour mill. Miete was married and had three children.

At the beginning of 1940, Miete joined the Nazi Party, and he soon became involved in the T-4 Euthanasia Program. The local Münster agriculture chamber advised Miete about a job at Grafeneck Euthanasia Centre, and he accepted an offer to work on the farm that was attached to this killing center. From May 1940 to October 1941 he worked at Grafeneck. Miete then became more involved in the killing process at Hadamar Euthanasia Centre, where he worked as a stoker; that is, one who removed corpses from the gas chambers, broke out gold teeth, burned the bodies and performed other tasks around the gas chambers and crematoria. At the end of June 1942, he was transferred to occupied Poland in order to take part in Operation Reinhard, and dispatched to Treblinka.

At Treblinka, Miete gained a notorious reputation for his cruelty. He was nicknamed the "Angel of Death" by the prisoners. Miete was in charge of the fake infirmary known as Lazaret, a small barracks surrounded by the barbed wire fence where the sick, elderly and difficult prisoners were taken away from view directly from newly arrived transports. The children of sick women and children who arrived alone on the transports were sent with them. They were shot point blank at the edge of a burial ditch seven metres deep. Miete carried out most of these killings with his own hand, aided by his subordinate Willi Mentz nicknamed "Frankenstein" by the inmates, who alone killed thousands, as well as Max Möller, the "Amerikaner". Dressed as medic, Miete "cured each one with a single pill".

Miete also supervised the nearby "selection" square for forced labor in the camp. He would walk about, checking Jewish prisoners. Those whom he deemed too sick or weak to work at the required pace were taken from the selection area to the Lazaret. Miete would stand each man near a pit where a fire was constantly burning, calmly aim his gun and shoot them. Sometimes Miete would instruct the victim to undress first.

Miete would also search prisoners. If Miete found money, food, or anything at all, he would beat them brutally before marching them to the Lazaret. In events where Miete found nothing incriminating, he would still fabricate a reason to beat the prisoner and bring him to the Lazaret. Miete also visited the living barracks and hospital room for the prisoners, where he would remove the sick and shoot them.

Miete described his own actions in testimony:

There were always sick and crippled people in the transports.... There were also those who had been shot and wounded en route by SS, policemen, or Latvians who guarded the transports. These ill, crippled, and wounded passengers were brought to the Lazaret by a special group of workers. Inside the Lazaret they placed or lay these people at the edge of the pit. When all the sick and wounded had been brought, it was my job to shoot them. I fired at the nape of the neck with a 9 mm pistol. Those shot would fall... into the pit... The number of people shot in this way from each transport varied. Sometimes two or three, and sometimes twenty or even more. They included men and women, young and old, and also children.... — August Miete

Miete also sought out victims from other parts of the camp to be brought to the Lazaret and shot; victims whom Kurt Franz had injured with his hunting rifle or boxing gloves, prisoners who had been whipped for various "crimes" or other reasons. Miete would decide that these prisoners were too weakened from the blows sustained and no longer fit for work, so he would shoot them.

After Treblinka's closure in November 1943, Miete was sent to Trieste along with other Operation Reinhard personnel.

== Trial and conviction ==
After the war, Miete fell into American captivity, but was soon released. Thereafter, Miete worked in the family's farming/milling business until 1950, and then as managing director of the Savings and Loan Association in Lotte. He was arrested again on 27 May 1960 and held in pre-trial detention at Düsseldorf-Derendorf. On 3 September 1965, at the First Treblinka Trial, Miete was found guilty of participating in the mass murder of at least 300,000 people and at least nine people who were shown in detail to him. He was sentenced to life imprisonment there. On February 27, 1985, Miete was conditionally released from prison, and retired near Osnabrück. He died in 1987.
