= Paul Bredow =

SS sergeant and Holocaust perpetrator (1902–1945)

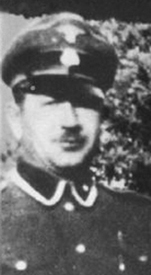
- Born: 31 October 1903; Koźliny, German Empire
- Died: December 1945 (aged 42); Göttingen, Lower Saxony, Allied-occupied Germany
- Military career
- Allegiance: Nazi Germany
- Branch: Schutzstaffel
- Rank: Unterscharführer
- Unit: SS-Totenkopfverbände
- Commands: Treblinka extermination camp

Paul Bredow (31 October 1903 – December 1945) was a German SS sergeant and Holocaust perpetrator. He served at Treblinka extermination camp during the Operation Reinhard phase of the Holocaust in Poland.

Bredow was from German Silesia (Schlesien). He served at Grafeneck Euthanasia Centre and Hartheim Euthanasia Centre. He came to Treblinka together with Franz Stangl in the first group of German SS. He served there until spring 1943. Bredow was the head of the Kommando Rot clothing sorting unit at the Barracks A in the camp's zone 2 Auffanglager, remembered for his pathological cruelty by survivors. In spring 1943, he was transferred to Sobibor, where he was put in charge of the "Lazarett". His hobby there was the target shooting of Jews with a pistol, fifty a day, which was fully approved by his superior Christian Wirth.

Bredow was transferred to San Sabba concentration camp in Trieste (Italy) before the war ended. He returned to Germany after the war and worked for a few months as carpenter together with his SS friend Karl Frenzel in Giessen until November 1945. Bredow was killed in an accident in Göttingen in December 1945.
