= Josef Hirtreiter =

SS officer and war criminal (1909–1978)

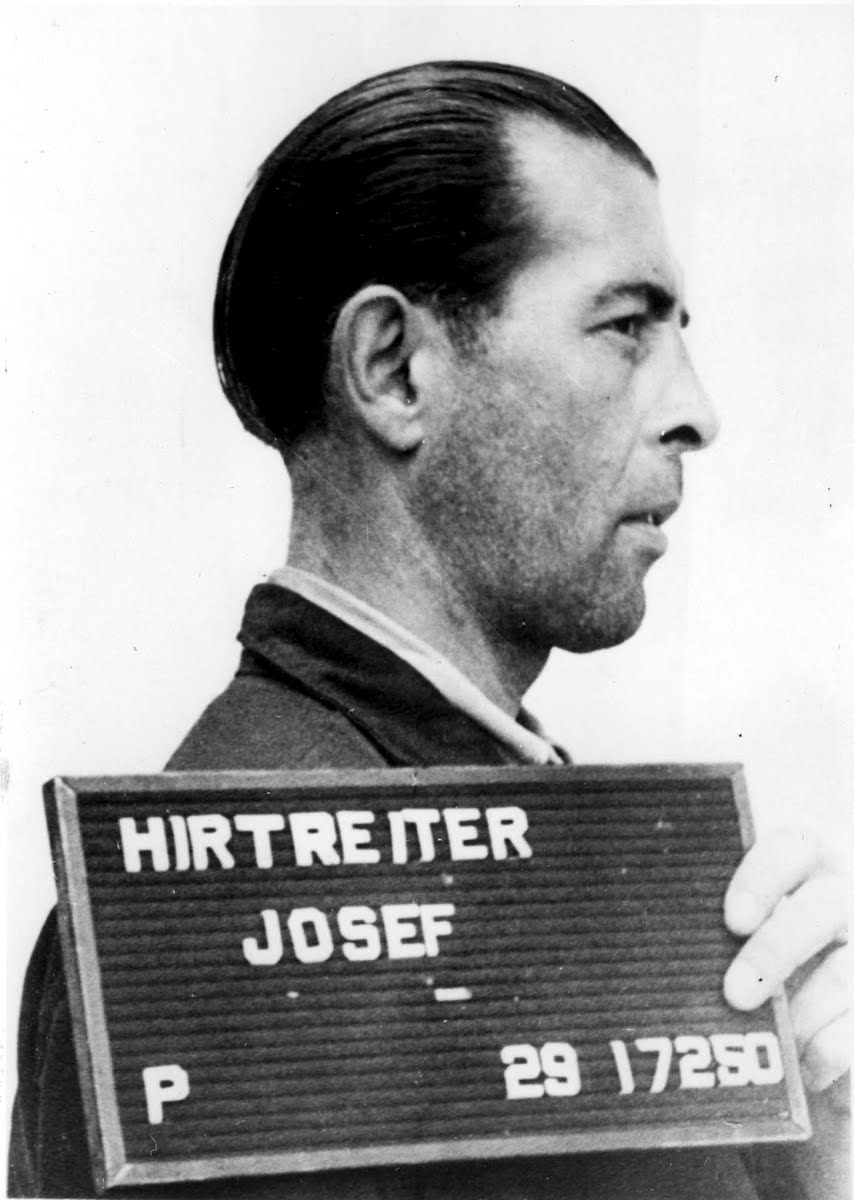
- Hirtreiter in U.S. custody (1946)
- Born: 1 February 1909; Bruchsal, Baden-Württemberg, German Empire
- Died: 27 November 1978 (aged 69); Frankfurt, Hesse, West Germany
- Conviction: Murder (10 counts)
- Trial: Treblinka trials
- Penalty: Life imprisonment with hard labour (1951)
- SS service
- Allegiance: Nazi Germany
- Branch: Schutzstaffel
- Service years: 1932-1945
- Rank: Scharführer
- Unit: SS-Totenkopfverbände
- Commands: Treblinka extermination camp

Josef Hirtreiter (1 February 1909 – 27 November 1978) was an SS functionary of Nazi Germany and a Holocaust perpetrator who worked at Treblinka extermination camp during the Operation Reinhard phase of the Holocaust in Poland. In July 1946, Hirtreiter was arrested by U.S. military occupation authorities and confessed to working at Treblinka. In 1951, Hirtreiter was convicted of killing 10 people, mostly children aged one or two, and sentenced to life in prison. He was released from prison in 1977 and died several months later in a home for the elderly in Frankfurt.

== SS career ==
Hirtreiter was born in Bruchsal. After elementary school, he worked as an unskilled construction worker and bricklayer. He failed the exam in lock-picking. On 1 August 1932 he became a member of the Nazi Party and Sturmabteilung (SA). After the invasion of Poland, in October 1940 he was assigned to the Hadamar Euthanasia Centre where he worked in the kitchen. In summer 1942 he joined the army. Four weeks later he was sent back to Hadamar, and then to Berlin from where Christian Wirth transferred him to Lublin reservation camp complex back in occupied Poland. There, he acquired the rank of SS-Scharführer and was shipped to Treblinka death camp. Hirtreiter served at Treblinka II from October 1942 till October 1943 at the camp-zone 2 Auffanglager receiving area. He monitored naked women, before gassing them. Later, he served at the Sobibór extermination camp.

After the closing of Treblinka in October 1943, Hirtreiter was ordered to Italy where he joined a police unit for the so-called anti-partisan "cleansing" operations (Bandenbekämpfung). His death camp superior, Franz Stangl, went there in order to set up the Risiera di San Sabba killing centre in Trieste.

== Trial and conviction ==
Hirtreiter was arrested by the U.S. military in July 1946 for having served at Hadamar Euthanasia Centre. American officials were unable to pin anything on Hirtreiter regarding Hadamar, but he did confess to working at a camp called Malkinia. He was sent to an internment camp in Darmstadt in September. A subsequent investigation revealed Malkinia as the Treblinka extermination camp. Unable to pin any specific atrocities on Hirtreiter, a denazification court instead sentenced him to 10 years in a labour camp as a major offender in 1948. However, in 1949, Hirtreiter was charged with murder after a West German prosecutor read about his denazification case in a newspaper article and decided to conduct his own investigation. Hirtreiter was tried by a court in Frankfurt via the testimony of Treblinka prisoner Szyja (a.k.a. Sawek, or Jeszajahu) Warszawski, who survived in a burial pit wounded, and slipped away under the cover of night, and a second witness, Abraham Bomba. In March 1951, Hirtreiter was found guilty of 10 counts of murder and sentenced to life in prison with hard labour. The court ruled that he had killed at least 10 people, mostly children aged one to two, during the unloading of the transports notably, by grabbing them by their feet and smashing their heads against the walls of boxcars, the same accusation leveled at many guards and is said to have happened numerous times in numerous places but never proven.

"The court considers it proven that Hirtreiter killed at least ten people, including small children, on his own initiative. In addition, the jury determined Hirtreiter's participation in the gassing of people during his deployment in Treblinka. Although it could not be proven that he was directly involved in the killing process in the death zone, his actions in connection with the undressing of the victims were partly responsible for their killing. Hirtreiter also wanted to kill the Jews himself and therefore acted as an accomplice and not just an accessory. This results from the fact that his overall behavior in Treblinka only allows the conclusion that he understood the ideology that led to the establishment of Treblinka, that is, the view that Jews are inferior enemies of the people whose extermination is inevitable, made it his own and considered the killing of the Jews to be right. In doing so, Hirtreiter had carried out murder characteristics of § 211 StGB both in connection with his participation in the mass killings and in his individual acts. First of all, the court considers the murder characteristic of 'other base motives' to be given, since the extermination of people solely out of ideological expediency and in the knowledge of their innocence must be classified as particularly despicable. In addition, Hirtreiter also acted cruelly and insidiously, especially since he himself helped to deceive the victims in Treblinka about their fate by supervising the undressing.”

Hirtreiter was released from prison in 1977 due to illness. He died several months later in a home for the elderly in Frankfurt.

== Sources ==
- Bartrop, P.R.; Grimm, E.E. (2019). Perpetrating the Holocaust: Leaders, Enablers, and Collaborators. ABC-CLIO. ISBN 978-1-4408-5897-0.
