= Franz Suchomel =

Nazi Officer (1907–1979)

- Born: 3 December 1907; Český Krumlov, Bohemia, Austria-Hungary
- Died: 18 December 1979 (aged 72); Altötting, Bavaria, West Germany
- Military career
- Allegiance: Nazi Germany
- Branch: Schutzstaffel
- Rank: Unterscharführer

Franz Suchomel (3 December 1907 – 18 December 1979) was a Czech-German Nazi war criminal. He participated in the Action T4 euthanasia program, in Operation Reinhard, and the Einsatzgruppen actions in the Adriatic operational zone. He was convicted at the Treblinka trials in September 1965 and spent four years in prison.

== Career ==
Franz Suchomel was born in Český Krumlov, Bohemia in 1907, when it was part of Austria-Hungary. After leaving school he worked as an apprentice in his father's tailor shop and took over the family business in 1936. At the end of the 1920s, and again briefly in the fall of 1938, he served in the Czechoslovak Army. Suchomel joined the Sudeten German Party (SdP) in 1938. After the incorporation of the Sudetenland to the Third Reich as a result of the Munich Agreement, he became a member of the National Socialist Motor Corps (NSKK), a paramilitary organization of the Nazi Party. At the beginning of the Second World War, Suchomel was a tailor in the German Army and served in the Battle of France in 1940. In March 1941 he became a photographer at the Hadamar Euthanasia Centre in the Action T4 headquarters in Berlin, where he took photographs of victims before their killing.

=== Operation Reinhardt ===
In August 1942, Suchomel was transferred to the Treblinka extermination camp. There he was responsible for handling incoming transports of Jewish victims as well as the confiscation and collection of valuables.

In October 1943 he served at the Sobibor extermination camp for a short time. After Operation Reinhard ended in November 1943, Suchomel was transferred along with the rest of Globocnik's staff to Operational Zone of the Adriatic Littoral in Trieste. Here he was a member of Sonderabteilung Einsatz R (English: "Special Action Unit R"), involved in extermination of Jews, confiscation of Jewish assets, and fighting partisan activity. As the end of the war approached, the "Special Unit" withdrew from northern Italy at the end of April 1945. Suchomel wound up in American captivity there as a prisoner of war and was released in August 1945. After 1949 Suchomel lived in Altötting, Bavaria. There he was again employed as a tailor, and served in five amateur orchestras as well as in the Catholic church choir.

== Trial, conviction and later life ==
Twenty years after the end of the war, in the framework of first official investigations into crimes against humanity at the Treblinka extermination camp, German authorities collected evidence of Suchomel's participation in the Holocaust. He was arrested on 11 July 1963. The Treblinka trials took place from 12 October 1964 until 3 September 1965 against ten defendants before the 3rd District Court of Düsseldorf. The charges consisted of the murder of at least 700,000 mainly Jewish people in the gas chambers, as well as deadly assault, shootings, and hangings of individual prisoners.

The verdict of the trial found that when on duty for the processing of incoming transports, Suchomel participated in herding newly arrived victims, striking them with a whip. Suchomel was acquitted of charges of individual murders.

Regarding his specific role as boss of the "Gold Jews":

"The Gold and Court Jews were glad to be under the command of the mild and easygoing defendant Suchomel, rather than one of the other German SS men, who were prone to harshness and cruelty. Some prisoners therefore called him "The Good German".

...The witness Gl. stated that, considering his behavior in relation to the horrific events in the camp, Suchomel was decent. Witnesses Un., Pla., Au., and Wei. expressed similar views. The witness Raj. particularly emphasized that Suchomel frequently warned the Jews about Franz and Küttner, thereby saving many a prisoner from an early death. The plumber Oscar Stra. During his sworn testimony, he correctly stated that Suchomel strove to improve the welfare of the Gold and Court Jews and that he treated them well to the best of his ability."

One witness, Moszek Laks, disagreed and said “It is quite possible that there were good Germans at the time, but in Treblinka I didn’t meet any.”

Suchomel was convicted of accessory to murder and sentenced to six years in jail. Suchomel was released from prison on 20 December 1967.

Franz Suchomel was secretly recorded during an interview for the documentary film Shoah, directed by Claude Lanzmann and released in 1985. During the interview at the Hotel Post in Braunau am Inn, he provided details of Treblinka criminal operations. He performed the Treblinka song which prisoners had to learn upon arrival at the camp. The lyrics in English translation were: "We know only the word of our commandant. We know only obedience and duty. We want to serve, to go on serving until a little luck once awaits us. Hurray!" He died on 18 December 1979.

== Literature ==
- Henry Friedlander: The Origins of Nazi Genocide – From Euthanasia to the final Solution Chapel Hill 1995, ISBN 0-8078-2208-6
- Ernst Klee: Das Personenlexikon zum Dritten Reich: Wer war was vor und nach 1945. Fischer-Taschenbuch-Verlag, Frankfurt 2007, ISBN 978-3-596-16048-8.
- Informationsmaterial des Bildungswerks Stanislaw Hantz e.V.: Schöne Zeiten – Materialsammlung zu den Vernichtungslagern der Aktion Reinhardt Belzec, Sobibor, Treblinka, Reader
- Samuel Willenberg: Treblinka Lager. Revolte. Flucht. Warschauer Aufstand. pp. 95–96. Unrast-Verlag, Münster 2009, ISBN 978-3-89771-820-3
