= Kurt Franz =

SS officer and criminal (1914–1998)

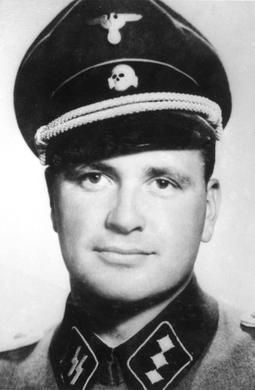
- Franz in 1943 or later
- Born: 17 January 1914; Düsseldorf, German Empire
- Died: 4 July 1998 (aged 84); Wuppertal, Germany
- Military career
- Allegiance: Nazi Germany
- Branch: Schutzstaffel
- Service years: 1935–1945
- Rank: SS-Untersturmführer
- Nickname: Doll (Yiddish: Lalke)
- Unit: SS-Totenkopfverbände
- Commands: Treblinka (deputy commander; became camp's third and final Commandant from August 1943 – 19 October 1943)

Kurt Hubert Franz (17 January 1914 – 4 July 1998) was an SS officer, final commander of the Treblinka extermination camp, and a major perpetrator of the Holocaust. Sentenced to life imprisonment in the Treblinka Trials in 1965, he was eventually released for health reasons in 1993. The verdict against Franz stated that "a large part of the streams of blood and tears that flowed in Treblinka can be attributed to him alone."

In his later life, Franz gave a televized interview in which he described the killing process at Treblinka. He died in 1998. His photographic album documenting his time at Treblinka bore the title "The Most Beautiful Years of My Life".

== Early career ==
Kurt Franz was born in 1914 in Düsseldorf. He attended public school in Düsseldorf from 1920 to 1928, and then worked as a messenger and as a cook. Franz's father, a merchant, died early. His mother was an observant Catholic. When she remarried, it was to a man with a strong right-wing nationalist outlook. Franz joined several right-wing national groups and served in the voluntary labor corps. He also trained with a master butcher for one year.

Franz joined the Nazi Party in 1932, and was conscripted into the German Army in 1935. After performing the military service in October 1937, he joined the SS-Totenkopfverbände (SS-TV). First he received training with the Third Death Head Regiment Thuringia at Weimar, and then served as cook and guard at the Buchenwald concentration camp, where he attained the rank of Unterscharführer (corporal).

== Action T4 ==
In late 1939 Franz was summoned to Hitler's Chancellery and detailed to take part in the Action T4 euthanasia program. He worked as a cook at Hartheim, Brandenburg, Grafeneck and Sonnenstein. In late 1941, he was assigned as cook at T4 headquarters.

On 20 April 1942, Franz was promoted to Oberscharführer (staff sergeant). In spring of 1942, Franz, along with other veterans of Action T4, went to Lublin concentration camp complex in the Generalgouvernement, and was posted to the Bełżec extermination camp, where he stayed until the end of August 1942.

== Treblinka ==
With a change of command in the Operation Reinhard death camp system, Franz was transferred to Treblinka extermination camp. He quickly became the camp's deputy commandant on the orders of Christian Wirth. He was promoted to serve as the last camp commandant from mid August until November 1943 to conclude the Holocaust in Poland.

In the testimony (27 February 1946) of one Samuel Rajzman at the major war crimes trial held in Nuremberg, Franz was "the commander of the camp" and orchestrated the building of the railway station at Treblinka. Rajzman said, "When the persons descended from the trains, they really had the impression that they were at a very good station from where they could go to Suwalki, Vienna, Grodno, or other cities." Rajzman also stated that Franz was responsible for the death of renowned psychologist Sigmund Freud's sister.

At first, Franz supervised work commandos, the unloading of transports, and the transfer of Jews from the undressing rooms to the gas chambers. He had a baby-like face, and for this he was nicknamed "Lalke" ("doll" in Yiddish) by the prisoners. But Franz's appearance belied his true nature. He was the dominant overseer in day-to-day interactions with prisoners in Treblinka, and he became the most feared man at Treblinka for the cruelty which he visited upon them.

In Treblinka, I was commander of the Ukrainian guard unit as I had been in Belzec. In Treblinka as in Belzec the unit consisted of sixty to eighty men. The Ukrainians' main task was to man the guard posts around the camp perimeter. After the prisoners' uprising in August 1943 I ran the camp more or less single-handedly for a month; however, during that period no more gassings were undertaken.

Facts prove otherwise. Despite visible damage to the camp during the revolt, the gas chambers were left intact and the killing of Polish Jews under Franz continued, albeit at a reduced speed with only ten boxcars "processed" at a time until the last transport of victims arrived on 19 August with 7,600 survivors of the Białystok Ghetto Uprising. Franz followed Odilo Globocnik to Trieste in November 1943.

=== Barry the dog ===
Franz was known for being unusually cruel and sadistic. He often made his rounds of the camp riding a horse, and would take his St. Bernard dog, Barry, along with him. Barry was trained to follow Franz's command, which was usually to bite the genitalia or buttocks of prisoners.

Barry's first owner was Paul Groth, an SS officer at Sobibor. Depending on his mood, Franz would set the dog on inmates who for some reason had attracted his attention. The command to which the dog responded was, "Man, grab that dog!" (German: Mensch, faß den Hund)—by "man", Franz meant the dog Barry, and the "dog" was the human inmate whom Barry was supposed to attack, in an effort at dehumanization. Barry would bite his victim wherever he could catch him. The dog was the size of a calf so that, unlike smaller dogs, his shoulders would reach to the buttocks and abdomen of a man of average size. For this reason, he frequently bit his victims in the buttocks, in the abdomen and often, in the case of male inmates, in the genitals, sometimes partially biting them off. When the inmate was not very strong, the dog could knock him to the ground and maul him beyond recognition.

When Franz was not around, Barry was a different dog. With Franz not there to influence him, the dog allowed himself to be petted and even teased, without harming anyone.

=== The Treblinka song ===
As reported by lower-ranking SS officers and soldiers, Franz also wrote the lyrics to a song which celebrated the Treblinka extermination camp. Prisoner Walter Hirsch wrote them for him. This song was taught to the few newly arriving Jews who were not killed immediately and were instead forced to work as slave laborers at the camp. These Jews were forced to memorize the song by nightfall of their first day at the camp. The melody for the song came from an SS officer at Buchenwald concentration camp. The music was written in a happy way, as though the deaths were a joyful process rather than one of mourning, in the key of D major. Franz's lyrics for the song are listed below:

Looking squarely ahead, brave and joyous, at the world. The squads march to work. All that matters to us now is Treblinka. It is our destiny. That's why we've become one with Treblinka in no time at all. We know only the word of our Commander. We know only obedience and duty. We want to serve, to go on serving until a little luck smiles on us again. Hurray!

=== Further torment of prisoners ===
Franz reviewed the prisoner roll call and participated in meting out punishments. For instance, when seven prisoners attempted to escape the camp, Franz had them taken to the Lazarett and shot. He ordered a roll call and announced that if there were further attempted escapes, and especially if they were successful, ten prisoners would be shot for every escapee.

Franz enjoyed shooting at prisoners or those still in the rail cars with his pistol or a hunting rifle. He frequently selected bearded men from the newly arriving transports and asked them whether they believed in God. When the men replied "yes", Franz told each man to hold up a bottle as a target. He would then say to them, "If your God indeed exists, then I will hit the bottle, and if He does not exist, then I will hit you." Then Franz would shoot at them.

Undoubtedly, [Kurt Franz] was the most terrifying of all the German personnel in the camp... witnesses agree that not a single day passed when he did not kill someone.

Franz had experience as a boxer before arriving at Treblinka. He put this training to sadistic use by victimizing Jews as punching bags. On occasion he would "challenge" a Jew to a boxing duel (of course the prisoner had to oblige), and gave the prisoner a boxing glove, while keeping one for himself, to give the illusion of a fair fight. But Franz kept a small pistol in the glove that he kept for himself, and he would proceed to shoot the prisoner dead once the gloves were on and they had assumed the starting boxing position.

Oscar Strawczinski wrote:

He rode through the camp with great pleasure and self-confidence. Barry, his big, curly-haired dog would lazily drag along behind...."Lalke" would never leave the place without leaving some memento for somebody. There was always some reason to be found. And even if there were no reason—it made no difference. He was an expert at whipping, twenty-five or fifty lashes. He did it with pleasure, without hurrying. He had his own technique for raising the whip and striking it down. To practice boxing, he would use the heads of Jews, and naturally there was no scarcity of those around. He would grab his victim's lapel and strike with the other hand. The victim would have to hold his head straight so that Franz could aim well. And indeed he did this expertly. The sight of a Jew's head after a "training session" of this sort is not difficult to imagine. Once Lalka was strolling along the platform with a double-barrelled shotgun in his hand and Barry in his wake. He discovered a Jew in front of him, a neighbour of mine from Czestochowa, by the name of Steiner. Without a second thought, he aimed the gun at the man's buttocks and fired. Steiner fell amidst cries of pain. Lalka laughed. He approached him, commanded him to get up, pull down his pants, and then glanced at the wound. The Jew was beside himself with pain. His buttocks were oozing blood from the gashes caused by the lead bullets. But Lalka was not satisfied. He waved his hand and said, "Damn it, the balls haven't been harmed!" He continued his stroll to look for a new victim.

In the 1964 trial, a witness gave testimony: "Describing his sufferings at the hands of ex-camp commander Kurt Franz and nine other defendants, Abraham Goldfarb, 55, said he once saw Franz join a group of Jewish children in play just before they were gassed. He said he heard Franz say at the time that children were “all headed for heaven.” He also said that the German guards would cut open pregnant Jewish women after they were gassed to make sure 'the fruit of their wombs' were also dead."

Franz was promoted to Untersturmführer (second lieutenant) and became an appointed official on 21 June 1943 on the orders of Heinrich Himmler. On 2 August 1943, Franz along with four SS men and sixteen Ukrainians went for a swim in the nearby Bug River, which depleted the security at Treblinka significantly and helped to improve the chances of success of the prisoner revolt that took place at the camp that day. After the revolt, the camp's commandant Franz Stangl left. Kurt Franz served as his replacement, and he was instructed to dismantle the camp and to eliminate every trace of evidence that it had ever existed. Franz had at his disposal some SS men, a group of Ukrainian guards and about 100 Jewish prisoners who had remained after the uprising. The physical work was carried out by the Jews during September and October 1943, after which thirty to fifty prisoners were sent to Sobibor to finish dismantling there, and the remainder were shot and cremated on Franz's orders.

After Treblinka, in late autumn 1943, Franz was ordered to Trieste and northern Italy, where he participated in the persecution of partisans and Jews until the war's end. He was wounded in late 1944 and, after recovery, employed as security officer on the Görz-Trieste railway line.

== Post-war trial and conviction ==
Following the war, Franz first worked as a laborer on bridges until 1949, at which point he returned to his former occupation as a cook and worked in Düsseldorf for 10 years until his arrest on 2 December 1959. A search of his home found a photo album of Treblinka with the title "The Most Beautiful Years of My Life" (German "Die schönsten Jahre meines Lebens").

Separate indictments included:

V.

1. Slaughtering a child
2. Shooting a child and his parents
3. Killing an infant
4. Killing an infant in the women's dressing area
5. Killing another infant in the women's dressing area
6. Shooting of an 18-year-old Jewish woman in a hospital
7. Killing a Jew with a rifle butt
8. The death of the Jewess Inka Salzwasser
9. Killing an old Jew
10. Killing another old Jew

VI.

1. Shooting of at least 10 prisoners in early September 1942 in retaliation for the attack on Max Biala
2. Selection of at least 80 working Jews the day after the death of Max Biala and their transfer to the shooting in the military hospital
3. Shooting of the Itzek Choncinsky on the latrine
4. Death of the Jewish doctor Roland Choranzicky
5. Injury of a prisoner from a shot with the hunting rifle and its liquidation in the hospital
6. Death of Hans Burg
7. Shooting of 7 inmates
8. Shooting of a prisoner who removed his Star of David
9. Shooting of a young prisoner in the upper camp
10. Shooting of inmates Chaim Edelmann, Jakob Edelmann and Salk Wolfowicz
11. Shooting of two prisoners in the military hospital for sport
12. Shooting of a prisoner in the military hospital, which he had previously injured by a lashing on the eye
13. Shooting of the prisoner Eliasz Adlerstein in the upper camp
14. Shooting of the prisoner Mendel Nuessenbaum in the upper camp from his horse
15. Killing of a prisoner in the military hospital, who had previously been injured by a shot in the hip
16. Shooting of a prisoner bitten by Barry in the hospital
17. Hanging of a prisoner in the upper camp
18. Liquidation of the prisoner from at least 25 persons of the Restkommando still alive at end of November 1943

VII.

1. The death of the young coachman
2. Shooting of a prisoner in the military hospital previously abused on the beating bench
3. Shooting of a prisoner on the sorting station
4. Shooting of a prisoner for a piece of bread
5. Shooting of a prisoner near the carrot bed
6. Shooting of a prisoner for attempted suicide
7. Killing of a young working Jew in the execution of grading on the sorting station
8. Shooting of a prisoner in the infirmary who wanted to give water to the Goldjuden* Stern
9. Killing of a Young Prisoner near the potato camp
10. Hanging of the Prisoner Sklarczyk
11. Whipping and killing of a prisoner in the lower camp
12. Hanging of three prisoners

VIII.

1. The death of a man who did not want to go to the upper camp
2. The killing of a working Jew by the sorting command due to several abdominal shots and a shot in the head
3. Hanging of two inmates, one of them called Langner
4. The shooting of the boxer from Krakow
5. Shooting of three inmates of the sorting command
6. The hanging of three inmates for conspiracy
7. The hanging of two prisoners who wanted to flee in a loaded freight car
8. Killing of a young Goldjude
9. Shooting of a logger in the death camp
10. Fatal mangling of a prisoner by the dog Barry near the so-called "cash register"
11. The killing of prisoners from the kitchen of the Ukrainians by Barry
12. The death of the Latrinenkapo
13. The killing of several prisoners in bottle-shooting
14. The killing of a prisoner who had arrived too late in the Appell (Appellplatz)
15. The killing of 12 inmates of the wood chipper command
16. The shooting of the Częstochowa Stajer
17. Shooting of about 350 prisoners by volleys from submachine guns
18. Shooting of a Polish farmer

At the Treblinka Trials in 1965, Franz denied having ever killed a person, having ever set his dog on a Jew, and claimed to have only beaten a prisoner once. On 3 September he was found guilty of collective murder of at least 300,000 people, 35 counts of murder involving at least 139 people, and for attempted murder. He was sentenced to life imprisonment.

== Imprisonment and later life ==
While serving his sentence, Franz exchanged letters regarding assigns with British researcher Michael Tregenza, who conducted excavations at Belzec. Franz was also visited by Jerome Brentar, a lawyer representing John Demjanjuk, who was incorrectly identified as "Ivan of Treblinka". Franz stated that Demjanjuk was not Ivan of Treblinka. According to Harrison et al., Franz's statements in prison undercut claims of Holocaust deniers, because Jerome Brentar had ties to deniers, and theoretically could "have publicized his case and presented the evidence that Jews were not exterminated at Treblinka". Franz never denied mass murders at Treblinka.

Franz was released in 1993 for health reasons. In 1998, a televised interview aired in which he discussed the process of mass murder and gassings at Treblinka.

Franz died in Wuppertal in 1998. In 2014, the New England Holocaust Institute and Museum acquired Franz's uniform.

Military offices
Preceded by SS-Obersturmführer Franz Stangl	Commandant of Treblinka extermination camp August 1943 – November 1943	Succeeded by None
