= Unterscharführer =

Paramilitary rank of the SS

- Gorget patch

- Shoulder and camo insignia
- Country: Nazi Germany
- Service branch: Schutzstaffel
- Abbreviation: Uscharf
- Formation: 1934
- Abolished: 1945
- Next higher rank: Scharführer
- Next lower rank: Rottenführer
- Equivalent ranks: Unteroffizier

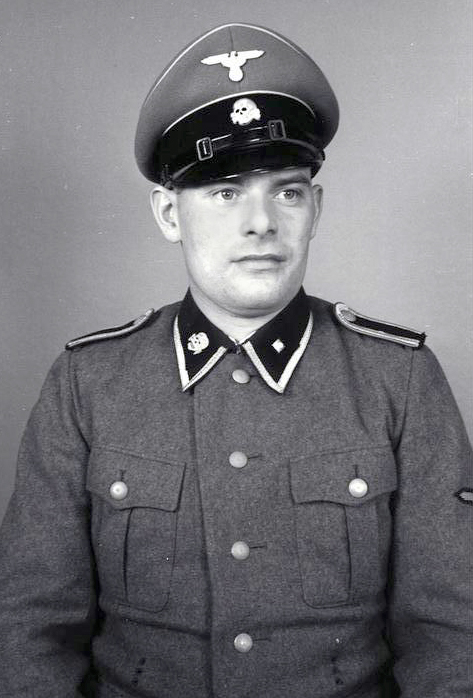
An SS-Unterscharführer serving at the Mauthausen-Gusen concentration camp

Unterscharführer ([ˈʊntɐʃaːɐ̯fyːʁɐ], lit. 'junior squad leader') was a paramilitary rank of the Nazi Party used by the Schutzstaffel (SS) between 1934 and 1945. The SS rank was created after the Night of the Long Knives. That event caused an SS reorganisation and the creation of new ranks to separate the SS from the Sturmabteilung (SA).

The insignia was a button pip centred on a collar patch opposite an SS unit insignia collar badge. The field grey SS uniform displayed the rank with silver collar piping and the shoulder boards of an Unteroffizier. Rank comparisons list the rank of Unterscharführer as equivalent to a corporal in other services, but the rank held responsibilities of a sergeant in some other armies.

== Creation ==
The rank of Unterscharführer was created from the SA rank of Scharführer. After 1934, an SS-Unterscharführer and SA-Scharführer were considered equivalent positions. The rank of SS-Unterscharführer was junior to SS-Scharführer and senior to the rank of SS-Rottenführer. An Unterscharführer was the most junior and most common non-commissioned officer rank of the SS and was the equivalent of an Unteroffizier in the German Wehrmacht.

== Uses ==
=== Allgemeine-SS ===
Within the Allgemeine SS (General SS) an Unterscharführer was typically considered a junior squad commander. The rank was held commonly as a non-commissioned officer staff position and could be found in all of the Nazi security agencies, including the Sicherheitsdienst and the Einsatzgruppen.

=== SS-Totenkopfverbände ===
In the concentration camp service, Unterscharführer holders were often assigned the position of Blockführer, which was a supervisory position overseeing order within a prison barracks of a concentration camp. The position of Blockführer is of note in the Holocaust, as it was typically Blockführer in charge of various Sonderkommandos.

=== Waffen-SS ===
In the Waffen-SS an Unterscharführer was as a junior squad commander, one of several attached to company and platoon sized formations. The rank was considered the equivalent to the first Waffen-SS officer candidate rank of Junker FA.

== Insignia ==
Shoulder strap (insignia)
SS-Unterscharführer
(Junker FA)

Gorget patches

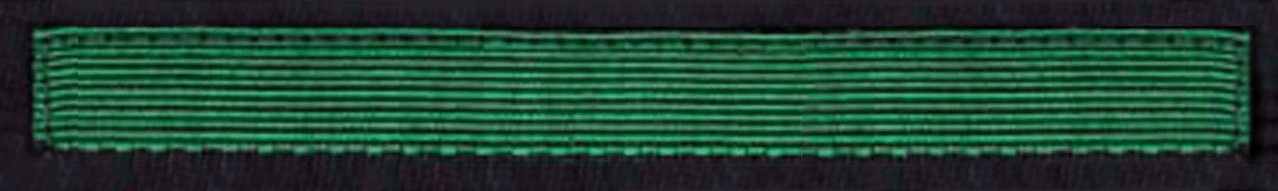
SS smock insignia

== Promotion ==
Requirements of a battlefield non-commissioned Unterscharführer were higher than that expected of an Unterscharführer in the General SS. In the Waffen-SS, candidates were required to undergo a selection process before being promoted. During this time the aspirant was known as an Untersharführer-Anwärter (English: junior squad leader candidate) until passing the required evaluation, training and promotion board.

== Notable recipients ==
- Oskar Gröning
- Franz Suchomel

== See also ==
- Table of ranks and insignia of the Waffen-SS

Junior rank Rottenführer	SS rank Unterscharführer	Senior rank Scharführer

== Bibliography ==
- Flaherty, T. H. (2004) [1988]. The Third Reich: The SS. Time-Life Books, Inc. ISBN 1-84447-073-3.
- McNab, Chris (2009). The SS: 1923–1945. Amber Books Ltd. ISBN 978-1-906626-49-5.
