= List of Sobibor extermination camp personnel =

At any given point in time, the personnel at Sobibor extermination camp included 18-25 German and Austrian SS officers and roughly 400 watchmen of Soviet origin. Over the 18 months that the camp was in service, 100 SS officers served there.

== SS personnel ==
Name	Rank	Function and notes	Citation
Kommandants
Franz Stangl	SS-Obersturmführer	First lieutenant, 28 April 1942 – 30 August 1942 transferred to Commandant of Treblinka extermination camp	
Franz Reichleitner	SS-Obersturmführer	First lieutenant, 1 September 1942 – 17 October 1943; promoted to captain (Hauptsturmführer) after Himmler's visit on 12 February 1943	
Deputy kommandants
Gustav Wagner	SS-Oberscharführer	Staff sergeant, deputy commandant (Quartermaster, sergeant major of the camp)	
Johann Niemann	SS-Untersturmführer	Second lieutenant, deputy commandant, killed in the revolt	
Karl Frenzel	SS-Oberscharführer	Staff sergeant, commandant of Camp I (forced labor camp)	
Hermann Michel	SS-Oberscharführer	Staff sergeant, deputy commandant, gave speeches to trick condemned prisoners into entering gas chambers	
Gas chamber executioners
Erich Bauer	SS-Oberscharführer	Staff sergeant, operated gas chambers	
Kurt Bolender	SS-Oberscharführer	Staff sergeant, gas chambers' operator	
Other staff officers
Heinrich Barbl	SS-Rottenführer	Private first class, pipes for the gas chambers (from Action T4)	
Ernst Bauch		Committed suicide in December 1942 on vacation in Berlin from his Sobibor duty	
Rudolf Beckmann	SS-Oberscharführer	Staff sergeant, killed in the revolt	
Gerhardt Börner	SS-Untersturmführer	Second lieutenant	
Paul Bredow	SS-Unterscharführer	Corporal, managed the "Lazarett" killing station	
Max Bree		Killed in the revolt	
Arthur Dachsel		Police sergeant, transferred from Belzec in 1942, burning of corpses (Sonnenstein)	
Werner Karl Dubois	SS-Oberscharführer	Staff sergeant	
Herbert Floss	SS-Scharführer	Sergeant	
Erich Fuchs	SS-Scharführer	Sergeant	
Friedrich Gaulstich	SS-Scharführer	Sergeant, killed in the revolt	
Anton Getzinger	SS-Oberscharführer	Staff sergeant, killed in an accident with a hand grenade in September 1943, several weeks before the revolt	
Hubert Gomerski	SS-Unterscharführer	Corporal	
Siegfried Graetschus	SS-Oberscharführer	Staff sergeant, Head of Ukrainian Guard (2/2), killed in the revolt	
Ferdinand "Ferdl" Grömer		Austrian cook, helped also with gassings	
Paul Johannes Groth		Supervised sorting of clothes in Lager II	
Lorenz Hackenholt	SS-Hauptscharführer	First sergeant	
Josef Hirtreiter	SS-Scharführer	Sergeant, transferred from Treblinka in October 1943 for a short while	
Franz Hödl			
Jakob Alfred Ittner	SS-Oberscharführer	Staff sergeant	
Robert Jührs	SS-Unterscharführer	Corporal	
Aleks Kaizer			
Rudolf "Rudi" Kamm			
Johann Klier	SS-Untersturmführer	Second lieutenant	
Fritz Konrad	SS-Scharführer	Sergeant, killed in the revolt	
Erich Lachmann	SS-Scharführer	Sergeant, Head of Ukrainian Guard (1/2)	
Karl Emil Ludwig			
Willi Mentz	SS-Unterscharführer	Corporal, transferred from Treblinka for a short time in December 1943	
Adolf Müller			
Walter Anton Nowak	SS-Scharführer	Sergeant, killed in the revolt	
Wenzel Fritz Rehwald			
Karl Richter			
Paul Rost	SS-Untersturmführer	Second lieutenant	
Walter "Ryba" (real name: Hochberg)	SS-Unterscharführer	Corporal, killed in the revolt	
Klaus Schreiber			
Hans-Heinz Friedrich Karl Schütt	SS-Scharführer	Sergeant	
Thomas Steffl	SS-Scharführer	Sergeant, killed in the revolt	
Ernst Stengelin	SS-Unterscharführer	Corporal, killed in the revolt	
Heinrich Unverhau	SS-Unterscharführer	Corporal	
Josef Vallaster	SS-Scharführer	Sergeant, killed in the revolt	
Otto Weiss		Commandant of the Bahnhof-kommando at Lager I before Frenzel	
Wilhelm "Willie" Wendland			
Franz Wolf	SS-Oberscharführer	Staff sergeant, brother of Josef Wolf (below)	
Josef Wolf	SS-Scharführer	Sergeant, killed in the revolt	
Ernst Zierke	SS-Unterscharführer	Corporal	
Wachmänner guards (Soviet POW's)

== Soviet prisoners of war ==
- Ivan Klatt
- Emanuel Schultz
- B. Bielakow
- Ivan Nikiforow
- Mikhail Affanaseivitch Razgonayev
- J. Zajcew
- Ivan Demjanjuk (alleged; conviction pending appeal not upheld by German criminal court)
- Emil Kostenko
- M. Matwiejenko
- W. Podienko
- Fiodor Tichonowski
- Iwan Karakasz (deserted and joined Soviet partisans)
- Kaszewacki (deserted and joined Soviet partisans)
- Wiktor Kisiljew (escaped along with Jewish prisoners in 1941, killed by police)
- Wasyl Zischer (escaped along with Jewish prisoners in 1941, killed by police)
