= Hermann Michel =

German SS officer (1912–1984)

- Hermann Michel
- Born: 20 February 1909; Westerkappeln, German Empire
- Died: 8 August 1984 (aged 75)?
- Military career
- Allegiance: Nazi Germany
- Branch: Schutzstaffel
- Rank: SS-Oberscharführer (Staff Sergeant)
- Nickname: Preacher
- Unit: SS-Totenkopfverbände
- Commands: Sobibór extermination camp, gave speeches to trick prisoners into entering gas chambers
- Awards: NSDAP Party Badge

Hermann Michel (German: [ˈhɛʁman ˈmɪçl̩]; 20 February 1909 – 8 August 1984?), sometimes referred to as "Preacher", was a Nazi and SS-Oberscharführer (Staff Sergeant). During World War II, he participated in the extermination of Jews at the Sobibór extermination camp during the Nazi operation known as Aktion Reinhard. According to the Majdanek Museum, a different person named Hermann Michel, born 23.04.1912 in Passau, served at Buchenwald, Majdanek and Sachsenhausen. This person was killed in 1944.

== Biography ==
Hermann Michel was born either in 1906 or 1909. His exact location of origin is not clear. In the mid-1930s, he began working as a nurse at the Berlin-Buch medical center. By the late 1930s, along with Franz Stangl and Christian Wirth, he was working as a head nurse at Hartheim killing center, where the physically and mentally disabled were exterminated by gassing and lethal injection as part of the T-4 Euthanasia Program.

In April 1942, SS-Obersturmführer (First Lieutenant) Franz Stangl was appointed commander of Sobibor. Stangl appointed SS-Oberscharführer Hermann Michel as his deputy, due to their prior work relationship and his extensive experience in the enforced euthanasia programs.

Hermann Michel is described as a tall, graceful man with delicate features and a pleasant voice. His polite and refined speech earned him the nickname "Preacher".

Ada Lichtman, a Sobibór survivor, described how Hermann Michel deceived the new arrivals:

We heard word for word how Oberscharführer Michel, standing on a small table, convinced the people to calm down. He promised them that after the baths all their belongings would be returned to them and that it was time for Jews to become a productive element. At present all of them would be going to the Ukraine to live and work. This address aroused confidence and enthusiasm among the people. They applauded spontaneously and sometimes even danced and sang.

After this convincing speech, the pacified prisoners were directed to hand in their valuables, undress and receive a haircut prior to being forced into the gas chambers.

SS-Oberscharführer Kurt Bolender, Commander of Sobibór Camp 3, testified at his trial as to how the extermination process operated:

Before the Jews undressed, Oberscharführer Hermann Michel made a speech to them. On these occasions, he used to wear a white coat to give the impression [that he was] a physician. Michel announced to the Jews that they would be sent to work. But before this they would have to take baths and undergo disinfection, so as to prevent the spread of diseases.... After undressing, the Jews were taken through the so-called Schlauch ("tube"). They were led to the gas chambers not by the Germans but by Ukrainians.... After the Jews entered the gas chambers, the Ukrainians closed the doors.... The motor which supplied the gas was switched on by a Ukrainian called Emil and by a German driver called Erich Bauer from Berlin. After the gassing, the doors were opened, and the corpses were removed by a group of Jewish workers....

On 14 October 1943, there was a successful uprising and escape of Jewish prisoners at Sobibór. The destruction of Sobibór caused Aktion Reinhard to come to an end. The surviving 125 Sobibór camp SS personnel, including Hermann Michel, were transferred to Trieste, Italy, to conduct Nazi security warfare against alleged partisans. While in prison in 1971, Franz Stangl stated in an interview, "We were an embarrassment to our [superiors]. They wanted to find ways and means to 'incinerate' us." It was believed by Franz Stangl that Hermann Michel survived World War II and escaped to Egypt, although this has never been proven.

Some sources suggest that Hermann Michel died on 8 August 1984 in Egypt but it has never been conclusively proven.
