= Erich Lachmann =

German SS functionary (1909–1972)

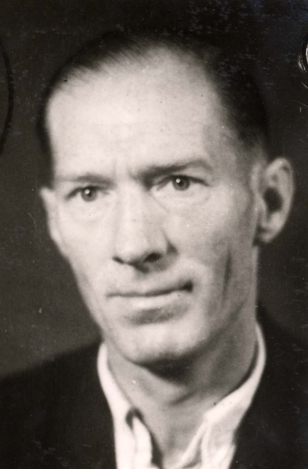
- Born: 6 November 1909; Liegnitz, German Empire
- Died: 23 January 1972 (aged 62); Wegscheid, West Germany
- Military career
- Allegiance: Nazi Germany
- Branch: Schutzstaffel
- Rank: Scharführer
- Commands: Oversaw watchmen at Sobibor; trained watchmen at Trawniki
- Other work: Bricklayer

Erich Gustav Willie Lachmann (6 November 1909 – 23 January 1972) was an SS functionary who participated in Operation Reinhard in Sobibor extermination camp. Lachmann was born on 6 November 1909 in Legnica. His first job was that of a journeyman bricklayer. In spring 1933, he joined the Stahlhelm paramilitary organization and subsequently the SA, despite not being a member of the Nazi Party. In September of that same year, he was conscripted into the auxiliary police force and attended an Unterführer training course in Katowice. Despite failing the course, he was promoted to Oberwachtmeister.

In September 1941, Lachmann was stationed at Trawniki concentration camp, where he was tasked with retraining Soviet POW's to serve as watchmen at extermination camps. During this time, he began a relationship with a local Polish woman. In mid-1942, Lachmann himself was sent to Sobibor to serve as the commander of the watchmen. The watchmen under his command performed a variety of tasks including supervision of prisoners' work details and unloading new transports of prisoners. While performing these tasks, they frequently bullied the prisoners. However, it is unknown whether Lachmann himself ordered them to do so and to what extent he personally participated. During his service at Sobibor, at least 12,000 people were murdered in the gas chambers. Two survivors of Sobibor said they witnessed him rape young girls.

At Sobibor, Lachmann was known for his incompetence. Fellow SS man Erich Bauer called him "a boozer and somebody who stole like the ravens". He was actively involved in the camp's underground trading economy, procuring food and alcohol for prisoners in exchange for valuables from the sorting barracks. When Franz Reichleitner took over command of Sobibor from Franz Stangl, he sent Lachmann back to Trawniki because he deemed that Lachmann was unfit for duty. In 1943, Lachmann discovered that he was to be transferred to Treblinka and deserted with his Polish girlfriend.

Two months later, Lachmann was arrested in Warsaw. An SS police court sentenced him to six years in prison for desertion. Lachmann would spend most of the remainder of the war in prison. In March 1945, he was released from an SS penal camp in Dachau concentration camp and assigned to a penal company. After six weeks of training, Lachmann was deployed as a soldier against the Red Army in Brandenburg, but quickly captured. A Soviet military tribunal later sentenced him to 25 years in prison with hard labour as a saboteur. He was released from prison on 5 May 1950.

In the Sobibor Trial in Hagen, which lasted from 6 September 1965 to 20 December 1966, he was accused of participating in the mass murder of approximately 150,000 Jews. During the trial, few Sobibor survivors could recognize him or provide reliable information about his actions at the camp. Lachmann's own testimony was vague, contradictory, and not always coherent. Lachmann was quoted as saying: "I had nothing against the Jews. I regarded them as all other people. My suits I previously bought from a Jew, Max Süssmann, who had a textile firm in Liegnitz." The court found Lachmann to be mentally incompetent and he was acquitted because of "putative duress".

== See also ==
- Sobibor extermination camp
- Sobibor trial
