= Karl Pötzinger =

Holocaust perpetrator from Treblinka

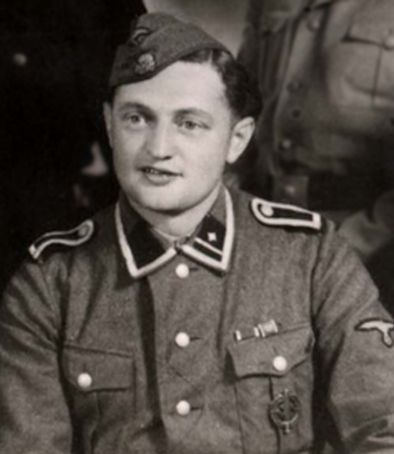
- Karl Pötzinger, Treblinka II
- Born: 1908; Leipzig, German Empire
- Died: 22 December 1944 (aged 36); Italy
- Military career
- Allegiance: Nazi Germany
- Branch: Schutzstaffel
- Rank: Oberscharführer, SS
- Unit: SS-Totenkopfverbände
- Commands: Treblinka extermination camp, Operational Zone of the Adriatic Littoral

SS-Oberscharführer Karl Pötzinger (1908–1944) born in Leipzig, Germany, was a Holocaust perpetrator who began his World War II career as the Action T4 “burner” at the Brandenburg Euthanasia Centre and at the Bernburg Euthanasia Centre with the rank of Staff Sergeant in the SA. Pötzinger was a career policeman at the outbreak of war. He was transferred to Treblinka extermination camp at the onset of Operation Reinhard of 1942 along with other gassing specialists. Pötzinger became Deputy Commandant of Treblinka II under SS-Scharführer Heinrich Matthes, supervising the gas chambers and later, serving as head of the cremation command in the Totenlager as soon as the covering up Nazi crimes became paramount to the Nazi leadership notably to Heinrich Himmler himself during his visit to Treblinka in 1943.

Treblinka was built as part of the most deadly phase of the Final Solution, known as Aktion Reinhard, and operated between July 23, 1942 and October 19, 1943. During this time, more than 800,000 Jews – men, women, and children – were murdered there, with other estimates exceeding 1,000,000 victims.

Karl Pötzinger was transferred from Treblinka to Sobibór extermination camp temporarily before being posted to Italy. He died on 22 December 1944 from the shrapnel wound sustained in an air-raid. He is buried at the German Military Cemetery in Costermano near Verona, Italy.

== See also ==
- Max Möller (SS officer), ordinance at Camp 2 Auffanglager in Treblinka
