= Sobibor trial =

War crimes trial against SS officials

Sobibór trial
- Opening of the Sobibor trial at the District Court in Hagen on 9 June 1965
- Court: Urteil LG Hagen, West Germany
- Started: 6 September 1965
- Decided: 20 December 1966

The Sobibor trial was a 1965–66 judicial trial in the West German prosecution of SS officers who had worked at Sobibor extermination camp; it was held in Hagen. It was one of a series of similar war crime trials held during the early and mid-1960s, such as the 1961 trial of Adolf Eichmann by Israel in Jerusalem, and the Frankfurt Auschwitz trials of 1963–65, also held in West Germany. These trials heightened general public and international understanding of the extent of the crimes that had been perpetrated in occupied Poland some twenty years earlier by Nazi bureaucrats and persons acting as their executioners.

The Soviet Union conducted trials in the 1960s of former Trawniki men, mostly Ukrainian Soviet POWs who had trained for the Nazis and worked at Sobibor. Most were convicted and executed. In these and subsequent years, separate trials prosecuted personnel of the Belzec (1963–65), Treblinka (1964–65), and Majdanek (1975–81) extermination camps, all of which had been located in Poland.

== West German investigation ==
Dietrich Zeug of the Ludwigsburg State Archives, in charge of preparing the documents to be put before the court at the Sobibor trial, studied old files related to other trials. He stumbled upon evidence related to numerous individuals who had never before been investigated. Some key SS officers who had served at Sobibor had been tried more than a decade earlier on other charges, such as SS-Oberscharführer Hubert Gomerski. He was acquitted in the euthanasia trials of 1947, which prosecuted persons known to have been involved in Action T4. Gomerski was convicted and sentenced in 1950, and was imprisoned at Butzbach.

Zeug asked authorities for help, and by spring 1960 had identified three dozen men directly involved in Action T4 (the killing of mentally and physically disabled persons in Germany) and in Operation Reinhard. He also contacted the World Jewish Congress and Yad Vashem in the following months. On 23 June 1960 he filed his first letter of recommendations for prosecution at the Central Office of the State Justice Administrations, requiring judicial action against 19 suspects.

Ludwigsburg officials learned for the first time in August 1960 about the whereabouts of some of the suspects, several of whom were living in Germany. Kurt Bolender lived under a false name in Hamburg and was identified in 1961. Karl Frenzel was caught in March 1962 in Göttingen. Heinrich Unverhau was arrested along with Franz Wolf no earlier than in March 1964.

Meanwhile, Israel identified twenty-two Sobibór survivors living in that country. By consulting with them, investigators increased their list of suspected Sobibór personnel to one hundred names. At this point the Federal Republic had determined that Zeug's reports were politically sensitive and classified them as secret.

== The trial ==
The German court in Hagen initiated proceedings on 6 September 1965 against twelve former members of the SS camp personnel, accusing them of crimes against humanity. (They constituted about a quarter of the SS men employed at Sobibór; twelve SS men had been killed in the October 1943 uprising by prisoners, which precipitated closure and destruction of the camp by the end of the year.) The verdicts were pronounced on 20 December 1966. Important testimony was provided by German historian, Professor Wolfgang Scheffler, as well as Dutch historian and Holocaust survivor Jules Schelvis, among others.

=== Proceedings ===
In the 1965–66 trial, the defendants claimed that once assigned to serve at a death camp, they did not believe they could refuse their orders, citing the statement made by Christian Wirth to the personnel at Sobibor (quote): "If you do not like it here, you can leave, but under the earth, not over it." But the prosecution noted that SS-Untersturmführer Johann Klier, who asked to be transferred from Sobibór on moral grounds, was not punished but allowed to leave, which proved that the contrary was true.

=== Verdicts ===
Defendant	Photograph	Rank	Indictment	Conviction	Sentence
Karl Frenzel		SS-Oberscharführer	Personally killing 42 Jews and participating in the murder of approximately 250,000 Jews	Personally killing 6 Jews and participating in the mass murder of approximately 150,000 Jews	Life imprisonment-served 16 years and died 1996
Kurt Bolender		SS-Oberscharführer	Personally killing approximately 360 Jews and participating in the mass murder of approximately 86,000 Jews		Committed suicide in prison custody before sentencing
Franz Wolf		SS-Oberscharführer	Personally killing one Jew and participating in the mass murder of 115,000 Jews	Participating in the mass murder of at least 39,000 Jews	8 years imprisonment
Alfred Ittner		SS-Oberscharführer	Participating in the mass murder of approximately 57,000 Jews	Participating in the murder of approximately 68,000 Jews	4 years imprisonment-died 3 November 1976
Werner Dubois		SS-Oberscharführer	Participating in the mass murder of approximately 43,000 Jews	Participating in the murder of at least 15,000 Jews	3 years imprisonment-died 22 October 1971
Erich Fuchs		SS-Scharführer	Participating in the mass murder of approximately 3,600 Jews	Participating in the murder of at least 79,000 Jews	4 years imprisonment; died 1980
Erich Lachmann		SS-Scharführer	Participating in the mass murder of approximately 150,000 Jews	Acquitted	Acquitted-died 23 January 1972
Hans-Heinz Schütt		SS-Scharführer	Participating in the mass murder of approximately 86,000 Jews	Acquitted	Acquitted
Heinrich Unverhau		SS-Unterscharführer	Participating in the mass murder of approximately 72,000 Jews	Acquitted	Acquitted
Robert Jührs		SS-Unterscharführer	Participating in the mass murder of approximately 30 Jews	Acquitted	Acquitted
Ernst Zierke		SS-Unterscharführer	Participating in the mass murder of approximately 30 Jews	Acquitted	Acquitted; reportedly died 1972
Erwin Lambert		SS-Unterscharführer	Participating in the mass murder of an unknown number of Jews	Acquitted	Acquitted; died 1976

By the time of this trial, some of the public had learned about SS-Oberscharführer Erich Bauer, an officer who was known as the gas chamber "meister" and was described by survivors as notoriously cruel and violent in his treatment of prisoners. He had been tried and convicted 15 years earlier, after being recognised in 1949 on the streets of Berlin by Sobibor escapee and survivor Samuel Lerer and was later apprehended. On 8 May 1950 Bauer was sentenced to death by a District Court in Berlin-Moabit. This was commuted to life in prison, as West Germany had abolished capital punishment. Bauer died in Tegel Prison in Berlin in 1980.

== Soviet Union trials of the 1960s ==
Some of the Ukrainian guards who served at Sobibór were prosecuted in Kiev, when Ukraine was part of the Soviet Union. (They had been Soviet POWs held by the Germans, who were known as Trawniki men if they agreed to train and serve as police and guards.) Defendants included B. Bielakow, M. Matwijenko, I. Nikifor, W. Podienko, F. Tichonowski, Emanuel Schultz, and J. Zajcew. They were convicted of treason against the state for having agreed to serve the Nazis, found guilty of war-crimes, and executed.

In April 1963, another trial was held, in Kiev, in which survivor Alexander Pechersky was the chief prosecution witness. Ten former Trawniki from Ukraine were found guilty and sentenced to death; all were executed. Another was sentenced to 15 years in prison.

A third Soviet trial was held in Kiev in June 1965. Three former Trawniki men from Sobibór and Belzec were convicted and sentenced to death. They were executed by a firing squad.

== See also ==
- Auschwitz trial of 1947 in Kraków
- Belsen trials
- Belzec trial, conducted before the 1st Munich District Court in the mid-1960s, with prosecution of eight SS-men of the Belzec extermination camp; seven were acquitted and released
- Chełmno trials of Chełmno extermination camp personnel. The first cases were prosecuted in Łódź, Poland (then part of the Soviet Union), soon after the war. Additional personnel were tried in 1965 in Bonn and Cologne, West Germany.
- Dachau trials were held 1945–1948, within the walls of the former Dachau concentration camp
- Majdanek trials, the longest series of Nazi war crimes trials in history, spanning more than 30 years
- Mauthausen-Gusen camp trials
- Nuremberg trials, these were trials by Allied prosecutors of the 23 most important leaders of the Third Reich, 1945–1946
- Hamburg Ravensbrück trials
- Treblinka trials, conducted in Düsseldorf, West Germany
