= Ziemke =

Ziemke is a surname. Notable people with the surname include:

- Cindy Ziemke, American politician
- Earl F. Ziemke (1922–2007), American military historian
- Glenn Ziemke (born 1956), American glassblower

== See also ==
- Zemke
- Ziem
- Zierke
