= Alfred Ittner =

SS functionary of Nazi Germany (1907–1976)

- Ittner in civilian clothing
- Born: 13 January 1907; Kulmbach
- Died: November 3, 1976 (aged 69)
- Military career
- Allegiance: Nazi Germany
- Branch: Schutzstaffel Sturmbabteilung
- Service years: 1931–1945
- Rank: Oberscharführer
- Unit: Totenkopfverbände
- Awards: NSDAP Party Badge Golden Party Badge SS-Civil Badge NSDAP Long Service Medal in Bronze Honor Chevron of the Old Guard

Alfred Ittner (13 January 1907 – 3 November 1976) was an SS functionary of Nazi Germany who served at the Sobibór extermination camp.

Ittner joined the Nazi Party in February 1927, with the membership number 30,805. He subsequently joined the Sturmabteilung in 1931. He worked on the staff of the Gauleiters of Hamburg and Berlin from 1934 to 1939, at which point he put in for a transfer to the Action T4 euthanasia programme in Berlin. He remained in this role, serving as a bookkeeper at the T4 headquarters until 1942.

== Operation Reinhard ==
In April 1942 Ittner was brought into the SS as part of Operation Reinhard and sent to Sobibór. According to the testimony of his colleague Kurt Bolender, SS-Oberscharführer Ittner served as camp accountant and one of his duties was to run the cashier's room where arriving inmates were forced to hand over their money and valuables to Ittner through a window. Herbert Floss would subsequently succeed him in this role.

Charged with supervising in Lager 3, close to the scene of a mass grave, Ittner found his time in this role harrowing and after four months there was, by his own request, transferred away back to the relatively less fraught surroundings of Action T4 in 1944. Ittner worked under Franz Stangl in this role although the two had a poor relationship, with Ittner claiming that his refusal to help Stangl misappropriate funds had led to a breakdown between the two.

Before long Ittner was conscripted into the army and sent to the Eastern Front, where he was taken as a prisoner of war by the Soviet Union. Released in 1948, Ittner disappeared until 1964 when he was arrested in his native Kulmbach, where he was found working as a manual labourer. Brought to trial in Hagen in 1965 for his role at Sobibór, Ittner was one of a number of defendants in the trial found guilty, although the relatively lenient four-year prison sentence handed down was widely condemned.

Ittner would state with regards to Sobibór:

The camp was a large and self-contained organization which had as its mission to kill as many Jews as quickly as possible.... The mass murder of the Jews was not carried out by one single individual, but by a multitude of SS people. Each one was a small cog in the wheel driving an extermination machine that could work only as long as all of them did. That is why, in my opinion, all the camp guards at Sobibór, regardless of their actual job, carried out the killings of the Jews. I would like to emphasize particularly that on arrival of a transport all other work was abandoned, and the camp staff all took part in the actual extermination process.
