= Rudolf Beckmann =

German SS officer in Sobibor extermination camp (1910–1943)

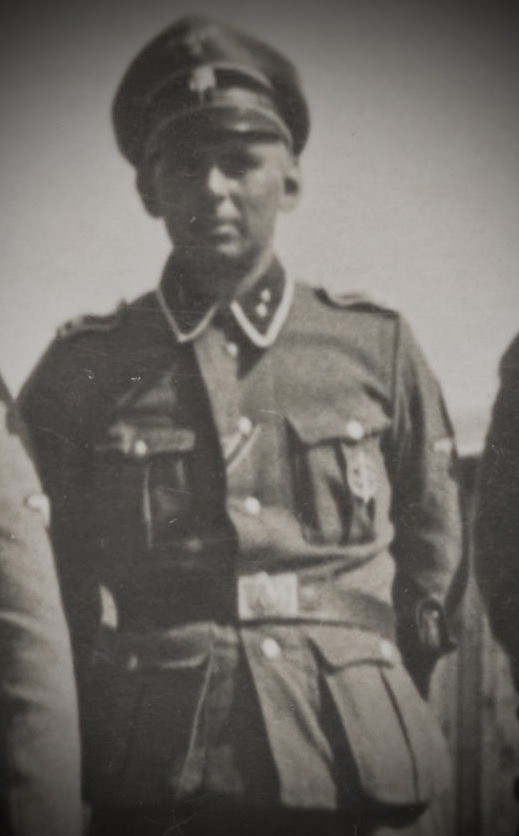
- Born: 27 April 1911; Osnabrück, Lower Saxony, German Empire
- Died: 14 October 1943 (aged 32); Sobibor extermination camp, Lublin Voivodeship, German-occupied Poland
- Paramilitary SS career
- Allegiance: Nazi Germany
- Service years: 1940–1943
- Rank: SS-Oberscharführer
- Unit: Death's Head Units
- Commands: Sobibor extermination camp

Rudolf Beckmann (20 February 1910 – 14 October 1943) was a German SS-Oberscharführer in the Sobibor extermination camp. He was stabbed to death during the uprising in Sobibor by inmates. Beckmann was a member of the Nazi Party (member 305,721) and the Schutzstaffel. Nothing is known about his early life.

== SS career ==
Beckmann worked initially in the cremation process at the Nazi Action T4 killing centers of Grafeneck Castle and Hadamar Euthanasia Centre, where the disabled were gassed. For Operation Reinhard, he was transferred to the Sobibor extermination camp, where he was mainly in Camp II as head of the sorting commands, where the clothing was sorted, and was responsible for tending to horses.

== Sorting command ==
After the Jews had arrived on the ramp, they were forced to strip naked and put all of their clothes and luggage to the side. Those who could not walk were taken away in carts. If this was happening too slowly, their clothes were torn from their body by force. Then the order came to go into the bath house (gas chamber). Prior to that, they had to pass a counter, at which was SS-Oberscharführer Alfred Ittner, who took from them all the valuables, such as gold and other jewelry. Once they were in the gas chamber, Walter Nowak and the brothers Josef Wolf and Franz Wolf, the cast-off clothes were brought to the nearby barracks for luggage and sorting. Then came the command of Rudolf Beckmann and Paul Groth; all papers, documents and objects that were not in the sorting barracks were stuffed in bags and brought to the cremation ground. Then, the ground was raked. "All this had to happen at a fast pace, so that subsequently the next group of Jews could be gassed in the same way as quickly as possible."

== Death ==
Beckmann was killed during the first phase of the Sobibor revolt, in which conspirators lured SS men to secluded locations and killed them covertly. The conspirators had originally planned to kill Beckmann in the Camp II storage barracks, but on his way to the appointment, Beckmann had suddenly turned around and headed back to his office in the administration building. Chaim Engel volunteered to kill Beckmann in his office, after overhearing the conspirators discussing the situation. Engel went to the administration building with a kapo named Pozyczki, and Engel stabbed Beckmann while Pozyczki restrained him. When Engel stabbed Beckmann, he shouted "For my father! For my brother! For all the Jews!" Beckmann struggled as Engel stabbed him, causing Engel's knife to slip and cut his own hand. Once Beckmann was dead, the two prisoners pushed his body under the desk, not having time to better hide his body.

== In popular culture ==
- Barbara Distel: Sobibor: In: Wolfgang Benz, Barbara Distel: Der Ort des Terrors. Geschichte der nationalsozialistischen Konzentrationslager. 8. Bd. Beck. München 2008. ISBN 3-406-57237-5
- Jules Schelvis: Vernichtungslager Sobibór. Unrast-Verlag. Hamburg/Münster 2003. ISBN 3-89771-814-6
- In the 1987 English film Escape from Sobibor, Beckmann was portrayed by Hugo Bower
- In the 2018 Russian film Sobibor, Beckmann was portrayed by German actor Dirk Martens

== Sources ==
- Rashke, Richard L. (1982). Escape from Sobibor. Houghton Mifflin. ISBN 978-0-395-31831-7.
- Schelvis, Jules (2007). Sobibor: A History of a Nazi Death Camp. Berg, Oxford & New Cork. ISBN 978-1-84520-419-8.
