= Erwin Lambert =

German Holocaust perpetrator (1909–1976)

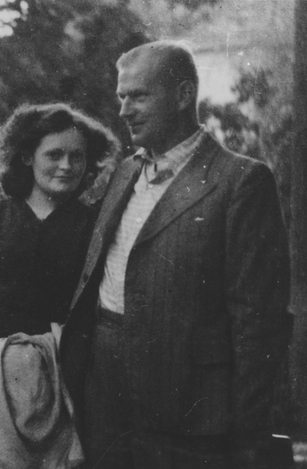
- Born: Erwin Hermann Lambert; 7 December 1909; Schildow, Mühlenbecker Land, German Empire
- Died: 15 October 1976 (aged 66); Stuttgart, West Germany
- Military career
- Allegiance: Nazi Germany
- Branch: Schutzstaffel
- Rank: SS-Unterscharführer
- Commands: Headed construction of gas chambers during Action T4, and at Sobibór and Treblinka extermination camps during Operation Reinhard
- Other work: Mason, Ceramic tile salesman

Erwin Hermann Lambert (7 December 1909 – 15 October 1976) was a German perpetrator of the Holocaust. By trade, he was a master mason, building trades foreman, Nazi Party member and member of the Schutzstaffel with the rank of SS-Unterscharführer (corporal). He supervised construction of the gas chambers for the Action T4 euthanasia program at Hartheim, Sonnenstein, Bernburg and Hadamar, and then at Sobibór and Treblinka extermination camps during Operation Reinhard. He specialized in building larger gas chambers that killed more people than previous efforts in the extermination program.

== Biography ==
Lambert was born on 7 December 1909 in Schildow, a small town in Mühlenbecker Land, in the Niederbarnim district. His father was killed in the First World War; his stepfather owned a construction firm in Schildow. After basic schooling, Lambert became an apprentice, first to a locksmith, and then to a mason. After passing his apprentice exam, he attended a school for the building trades in Berlin in the mid-1920s and passed his examination for master masonry in the mid-1930s. He was always employed as a mason and, after becoming a master mason, as a foreman for various Berlin construction firms.

Lambert joined the Nazi Party in March 1933, after Hitler's assumption of national power, and first worked within the Party as a Blockleiter in Schildow. Lambert was not yet a member of any of the party's paramilitary organizations.

Late in 1939, the Action T4 program tried to recruit Lambert, who had been recommended by the local office of the German Labour Front. He accepted the offer in January 1940. Lambert was hired to serve as a construction foreman who supervised the other workers; he was "the traveling construction boss of Action T4".

=== Construction of gas chambers ===
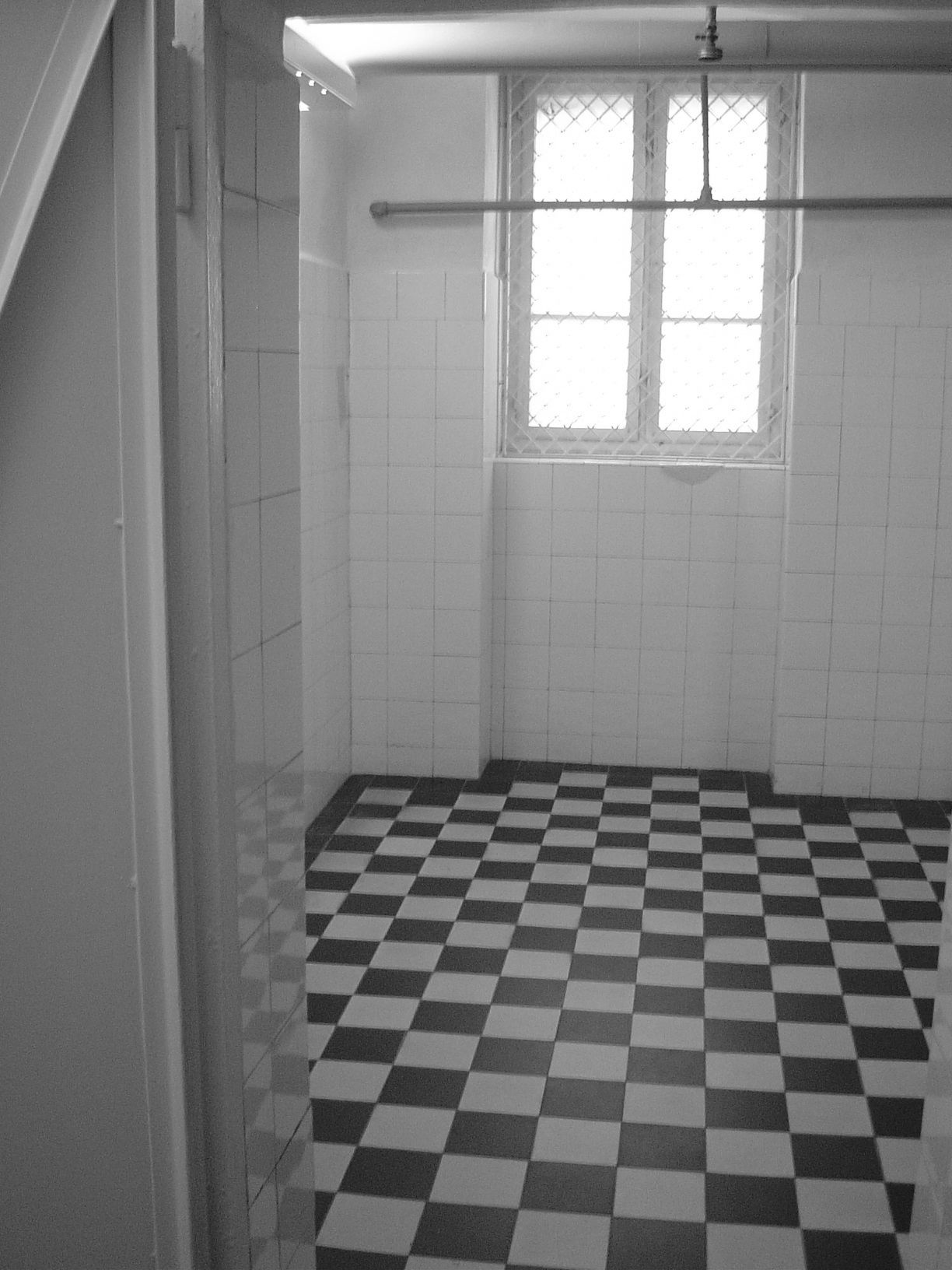
Gas chamber at Bernburg, designed by Erwin Lambert

Lambert's primary task was to direct construction work at the T4 killing centres, particularly the construction of gas chambers and crematoria. In testimony Lambert claimed that he merely erected room dividers and installed doors, a claim largely discredited. Since Brandenburg and Grafeneck had already been completed before Lambert joined the T4 program, he worked at Hartheim, Sonnenstein, Bernburg, and Hadamar as the program's "expert for the construction of gas chambers".

After T4's termination, Lambert was posted to Operation Reinhard in Lublin reservation for the purpose of bricklaying assignments which constructed the gas chambers in Sobibór and Treblinka extermination camps. At Lublin Lambert joined the SS. During this time, however, his work was often interrupted for further construction jobs in Germany and Austria involving the still-ongoing Action 14f13. With the help of Ukrainian volunteers and condemned Jewish prisoners, Lambert constructed solid gassing facilities at Sobibor and Treblinka: "Using his expert knowledge about gassing installations, Lambert was able rapidly to complete all work on the big gas house [in Treblinka]".

During his testimony at the Sobibór trial in Hagen, Germany (whose lead defendant was Kurt Bolender), lasting from 6 September 1965 until 20 December 1966, Lambert stated:

I was in the extermination camp of Jews for about two to three weeks. It was sometime in autumn 1942, but I don’t remember exactly when. At that time I was assigned by Wirth to enlarge the gassing structure according to the model of Treblinka.

I went to Sobibor together with Lorenz Hackenholt, who was at that time in Treblinka. First of all, I went with Hackenholt to a sawmill near Warsaw. There Hackenholt ordered a large consignment of wood for reconstruction in Sobibor.

Finally, both of us went to Sobibor. We reported there to the camp commander, Reichleitner. He gave us the exact directives for the construction of the gassing installations. The camp was already in operation, and there was a gassing installation. Probably the old installation was not big enough, and reconstruction was necessary.

Today I cannot tell exactly who participated in the reconstruction work. However, I do remember that Jewish prisoners and so-called Askaries (Ukrainian auxiliaries) took part in the work.

During this time that building was in progress, no transports with Jews arrived.

In addition, Lambert directed construction at several nearby forced labour camps such as Dohorucza and the Poniatowa concentration camp. Reportedly, Lambert attempted to remain an uninvolved expert devoted solely to his work and not interested in the conditions which surrounded it. According to one survivor, Jankiel Wiernik, Lambert avoided looking at dead bodies and treated his Jewish workers in a professional manner.

Unterscharführer Herman [sic] was humane and likeable. He understood us and was considerate of us. When he first entered Camp II and saw the piles [of bodies] that had been suffocated by the gas, he was stunned. He turned pale and a frightened look of suffering fell over his face. He quickly took me from the place so as not to see what was going on. With regard to us, the workers, he treated us very well. Frequently he would bring us food on the side from the German kitchen. In his eyes one could see his good-heartedness... but he feared his friends. All his deeds and movements expressed his gentle soul.

At the conclusion of Operation Reinhard, Lambert was posted to Trieste, where he continued installing cremation facilities at the concentration camp Risiera di San Sabba.

After the war, Lambert was arrested on 28 March 1962. At the First Treblinka Trial in 1965, Lambert was tried for the first time and sentenced to four years' imprisonment for aiding and abetting the murder of at least 300,000 people. Having already served this time, he was allowed to live as a free man. At the Sobibór Trial in 1966, Lambert was acquitted. At the trials Lambert denied involvement in the killing operation and claimed that he merely suspected that the buildings would be used for killing. Lambert died on 15 October 1976.
