= Heinrich Matthes =

Holocaust perpetrator (1902–1978)

- Matthes during SS service
- Born: 11 January 1902; Wermsdorf, German Empire
- Died: 16 December 1978 (aged 76); Bochum, West Germany
- Known for: Deputy commandant of Treblinka death camp
- Status: Deceased
- Convictions: Murder; Accessory to murder
- Trial: Treblinka trials
- Penalty: Life imprisonment
- SS career
- Allegiance: Nazi Germany
- Branch: Schutzstaffel
- Rank: Obercharführer Oberwachtmeister (Since Late 1943-) Obergefreiter (Wehrmacht)
- Unit: SS-Totenkopfverbände
- Commands: Camp II. in Treblinka Extermination Camp

Heinrich Arthur Matthes (11 January 1902 – 16 December 1978) was a German SS commander during the Nazi era. He served as a deputy commandant of Treblinka extermination camp during the Operation Reinhard phase of the Holocaust in Poland. Matthes was appointed chief of the extermination area at Camp 2 where the gas chambers were built and managed by the SS personnel overseeing some 300 slave labourers disposing of corpses under penalty of death. He was tried in the 1964 Treblinka trials, convicted, and sentenced to life imprisonment.

== Life ==
Matthes was born in 1902 in Wermsdorf, near Leipzig. His father was a senior male nurse. Matthes attended public elementary school for eight years. He then became a tailor, but changed careers to nurse. He trained at Sonnenstein and took his exam there. Then he worked at the Arnsdorf and Bräunsdorf hospitals. He married and had one daughter. At the beginning of 1934, he joined both the Nazi Party and the SA. When World War II broke out, he was drafted into the army. After about two years, Matthes was then recruited by Action T4, the Nazi state-sponsored program to kill disabled persons. He worked in the T4 photo laboratory and then served in the T4 unit with Organization Todt in Russia. Matthes' last rank in the Heer was Obergefreiter.

== Treblinka death camp ==
In August 1942, Matthes was ordered to Lublin reservation, where he was in short time drafted into the SS with the rank of Scharführer (Sergeant), dispatched to Operation Reinhard, and sent to Treblinka extermination camp. There he was appointed chief officer commanding Camp II (the extermination area) and the gas chambers. Matthes was remembered by fellow Treblinka SS officer Franz Suchomel in the following way:

Wirth installed Matthes as chief of Camp II, as far as I know — and I lived with Matthes — against his will. With further threats he also made Matthes toe the line.

Matthes was obsessed with cleanliness. In the autumn of 1942, Matthes shot two prisoners because at the end of the work day they had not properly cleaned to his satisfaction the stretcher which they used to transport corpses. In the winter of 1942–43, a typhus epidemic broke out in Treblinka. Matthes took eight sick inmates to the Lazarett and had them shot. During that same winter he shot the prisoner Ilik Weintraub because, while transferring bodies from the gas chambers to the pits, Weintraub had stopped for a moment to drink some water from the well.

Matthes as remembered by Jerzy Rajgrodzki, a prisoner in the extermination area:

He used to beat the prisoners with a completely expressionless, apathetic look on his face, as if the beatings were part of his daily routine. He always saw to it that the roll-call area would always be extremely clean. One of the prisoners had to rake the sand in the square all day long, and he had to do it with Prussian exactness.

In the autumn of 1943 Matthes was transferred to Sobibor extermination camp. He later served in Trieste with the other Operation Reinhard perpetrators. At the Treblinka Trials in 1965 he was sentenced to life imprisonment. Matthes died in prison in 1978.

== Matthes testimonies at trial ==
During the entire time I was in Treblinka, I served in the upper camp. The upper camp was that part of Treblinka with the gas chambers, where the Jews were killed and their corpses laid in large pits and later burned. About fourteen Germans carried out services in the upper camp. There were two Ukrainians permanently in the upper camp. One of them was called Nikolai, the other was a short man, I don't remember his name ... These two Ukrainians who lived in the upper camp served in the gas chambers. They also took care of the engine room when Fritz Schmidt was absent. Usually this Schmidt was in charge of the engine room. In my opinion, as a civilian he was either a mechanic or a driver. He came from Pirna ... I carried out the roll calls of the working Jews in the upper camp. There were about 200-300 such working Jews. They took away the corpses and later burned them. There were also working Jews who had to break out the gold teeth from the corpses. When I was asked whether a special working group examined the corpses for hidden jewelry and valuables, I answered: "About this I don't know".

In the upper camp in the area of the gas chambers were stationed about six to eight Ukrainians. These Ukrainians were armed with rifles. Some of them also had leather whips ... The people who were brought through the passage were forced to enter the separate [single] gas chamber. Later, in summer 1942, the new gas chambers were built. I think that they became operational only in the autumn. All together, six gas chambers were active. According to my estimate, about 300 people could enter each gas chamber. The people went into the gas chamber without resistance. Those who were at the end, the Ukrainian guards had to push inside. I personally saw how the Ukrainians pushed the people with their rifle butts ... The gas chambers were closed for about thirty minutes. Then Schmidt stopped the gassing, and the two Ukrainians who were in the engine room opened the gas chambers from the other side.

An SS-Oberscharführer or Hauptscharführer Floss arrived at this time [November 1942], who, so I presume, must previously have been in another camp. He then had the installation built for burning the corpses. The incineration was carried out by placing railroad rails on blocks of concrete. The corpses were then piled up on these rails. Brush wood was placed under the rails. The wood was drenched with gasoline. Not only the newly obtained corpses were burnt in this way, but also those exhumed from the ditches.
