= Belzec trial =

War crimes trial of SS staff

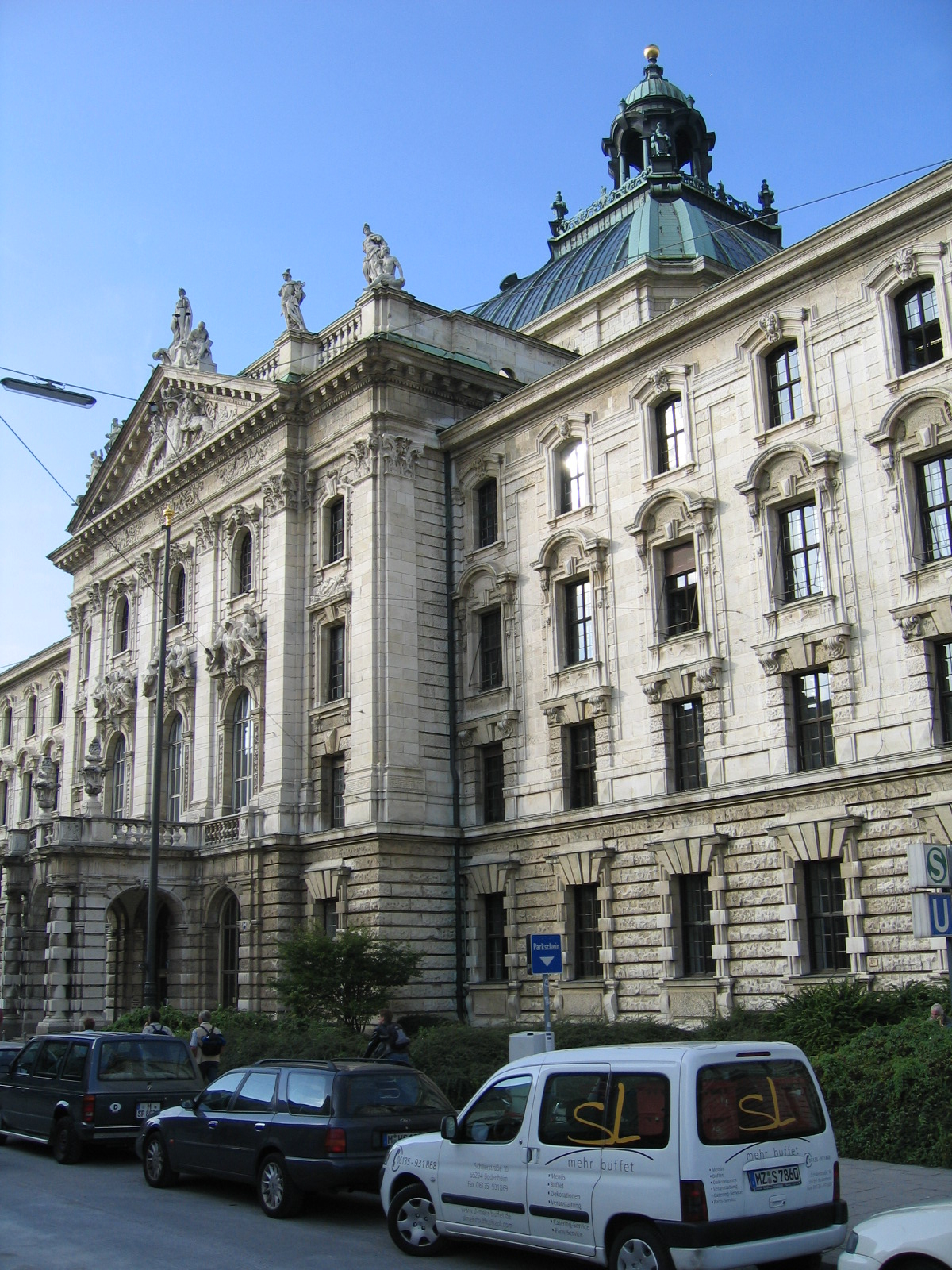
- The 1st Munich District Court (Landgericht München I). Trial location, 2012 photo.

The Belzec trial (German: Belzec-Prozess, Polish: proces Bełżec) in the mid-1960s was a war crimes trial of eight former SS members of Bełżec extermination camp. The trial was held at the 1st Munich District Court (Landgericht München I) and should be seen in the context of the Sobibor trial, which followed the Belzec trial, because five of the defendants were accused in both trials. In addition, the Belzec and Sobibor trials, along with the Treblinka trials, form a body of evidence of the crimes of mass extermination as part of the so-called Action Reinhardt programme – the killing of over two million Jews and 50,000 Roma and Sinti. These trials are directly related to the mass murder of 100,000 people in the official Nazi Euthanasia programme known after the war as Action T4, as many of the security guards worked in the euthanasia centres before transferring to the extermination camps. The first Euthanasia trials were carried out shortly after the war.

== Trial before the First Munich District Court ==
The legal case against the eight accused men, scarcely noticed by the public, was heard by the Munich District Court between 8 August 1963 and 21 January 1965. On 30 January the decision was made by the District Court not to hold a full trial of seven of the defendants because at the time of the crime they would have been adjudged to have found themselves under a putative (claimed) threat from the Nazi authorities (Putativnotstand). Amongst the seven defendants were five of the accused who later appeared in the Sobibor trial: Dubois, Fuchs, Jührs, Unverhau and Zierke. An appeal by the prosecution to put on trial all the defendants was rejected by the High Court in Munich, and all seven were set free.

In the trial that began on 18 January 1965 and ended on 21 January, the only defendant was Josef Oberhauser.

A total of 14 witnesses were heard, including Professor Wilhelm Pfannenstiel, who with Kurt Gerstein in August 1942 witnessed the gassing of Jewish victims at Belzec; Belzec survivor Rudolf Reder, who could neither name nor describe the defendant, and the accused – Dubois, Unverhau, Schluch, Zierke, Gley and Fuchs, against whom no proceedings were opened – and a former member of the camp staff at Belzec, Hans Gierzig, who was unfit to attend the trial due to illness. Oberhauser, who did not comment on the case, pleaded that he was acting under superior orders, as did the other defendants in the Belzec trial, and also drew attention to the jail sentence he already served out in the GDR. After consultation with the Attorney General of the GDR, however, it was ascertained that Oberhauser had only served a portion (eight years) of his fifteen-year prison sentence in the GDR and that he had not been convicted in Magdeburg of his role at Belzec extermination camp, but for his involvement in the Action T4 euthanasia programme. The court did not agree his defence that he was under a putative threat, because Oberhauser, as the adjutant for Christian Wirth (Camp Commandant of Belzec), must have had a good relationship with him. His subsequent lenient sentence by the Munich District Court took account of the more rigorous conditions in the prisons of the GDR and the potential maximum sentence of 15 years, if the two crimes (Belzec and Action 4) had been handled together in a single judicial process. An appeal to the Federal Court confirmed the sentence against Oberhauser.

=== Crimes and sentences in detail ===
Defendant	Role in Belzec	Crime	Sentence
Josef Oberhauser	Go-between for the staff of the SS and Police Leader, no specific sphere of duty	Accessory to 300,000 cases (charged with 450,000) of collective murder and five other crimes of aiding and abetting collective murder in each of 150 cases	4.5 years imprisonment and loss of the citizen's rights for three years.
Erich Fuchs	Handling incoming prisoners, procurement of material for the construction of a new gas chamber	Accessory to 90,000 cases of collective murder	Acquittal on grounds of acting under duress (Putativnotstand)
Heinrich Gley	Handling incoming prisoners, supervision in the undressing barracks	Accessory to 170,000 cases of collective murder	Acquittal on grounds of acting under duress
Werner Dubois	Handling incoming prisoners (30,000 people), head of Jewish work details	Accessory to 360,000 cases of collective murder	Acquittal on grounds of acting under duress
Karl Schluch	Deception of Jewish victims of their fate on their way to the gas chamber	Accessory to 360,000 cases of collective murder	Acquittal on grounds of acting under duress
Heinrich Unverhau	Recovery and dispatch of the clothing of victims	Accessory to 360,000 cases of collective murder	Acquittal on grounds of acting under duress
Robert Jührs	Supervisory duties	Accessory to 360,000 cases of collective murder	Acquittal on grounds of acting under duress
Ernst Zierke	Smithing, and handling incoming prisoners	Accessory to 360,000 cases of collective murder	Acquittal on grounds of acting under duress

This first trial connected with the three death camps at Belzec, Sobibor and Treblinka established under Action Reinhardt exposed the difficulties faced by the German federal judiciary in punishing with Nazi war crimes. After 1945 it was decided before German courts that no special law would be introduced to deal with Nazi crimes, but that they would be dealt with under normal criminal law. In addition to the difficult problems of distinguishing between perpetrators and accessories, the evidence could often not be furnished, as is shown in another case:

Amongst the four attempted murders, the excessive actions included the shooting at an old woman carried out by Gomerski with a submachine gun at close range. Presumably, the woman died from the shots, but the prisoner who had observed the act, did not take any further notice of the incident out of fear. So the court had to try attempted murder because there was no proof that the murder was achieved.

In addition, the defence of obeying superior orders, at least in the Belzec trial, was a factor that inhibited the award of sanctions. It is not entirely clear why this defence was accepted for seven defendants in the Belzec trial but not for the five defendants in the Sobibor trial nor even Josef Oberhauser.

As part of the trial of John Demjanjuk in 2009–10, witness' statements from the 1940s and 1960s were made available relating to yet another former security guard at Belzec, Samuel K. who was 88 years old at the time and living in Wachtberg im Rhein-Sieg-Kreis. The Central Office of the State Justice Administrations for the Investigation of National Socialist Crimes in Ludwigsburg has undertaken preliminary investigations in January 2010 but no arrest was made.

== See also ==
- Auschwitz trial
- Belsen trials
- Chełmno trials of the Chełmno extermination camp personnel, held in Poland and in Germany. The cases were decided almost twenty years apart
- Dachau trials held within the walls of the former Dachau concentration camp, 1945–1948
- Frankfurt Auschwitz trials
- Majdanek trials, the longest Nazi war crimes trial in history, spanning over 30 years
- Mauthausen-Gusen camp trials
- Nuremberg trials of the 23 most important leaders of the Third Reich, 1945–1946
- Ravensbrück trial
- Sobibor trial held in Hagen, Germany in 1965 against the SS-men of the Sobibor extermination camp
- Treblinka trials in Düsseldorf, Germany

== Literature ==
- Kerstin Freudiger: Die juristische Aufarbeitung von NS-Verbrechen. Mohr-Siebeck, Tübingen 2002, ISBN 3-16-147687-5.
- Informationsmaterial des Bildungswerks Stanislaw Hantz e.V.: Belzec, Reader – based on a previously unpublished manuscript by historiand and head of the Belzec Memorial Site, Robert Kuwalek
