= Zierke =

Zierke is a surname associated with notable individuals such as:

- Ernst Zierke (1905–1972), a German member of the Schutzstaffel
- Stefan Zierke (born 1970), a German politician

== See also ==
- Ziemke
