= Zemko =

Zemko is a surname. Notable people with the surname include:

- Josip Zemko (1946–2017), Yugoslav footballer and manager
- Juraj Zemko (born 1989), Slovak ice hockey player
- Milan Zemko (1944-2013), Slovak politician
- Yevgeniy Zemko (born 1996), Belarusian footballer

== See also ==
- Zemke
