= Franz Wolf (SS officer) =

German Nazi senior squad leader

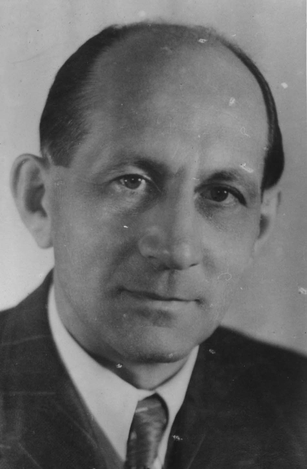
- SS-Oberscharführer Franz Wolf in civilian clothing
- Born: 9 April 1907; Krummau, Austria-Hungary (today Český Krumlov, Czech Republic)
- Died: 9 October 1999 (aged 92); Palling, Germany
- Military career
- Allegiance: Nazi Germany
- Branch: Schutzstaffel
- Rank: Oberscharführer
- Unit: SS-Totenkopfverbände
- Commands: Sobibor extermination camp

SS-Oberscharführer Franz Wolf (9 April 1907 – 9 October 1999) was a German Nazi senior squad leader serving with the Action T4 forced euthanasia program, and later, at the Sobibór extermination camp in occupied Poland during the most deadly phase of the Holocaust, codenamed Operation Reinhard. Leading a normal life in West Germany for the next twenty years, along with thousands of war criminals protected by Konrad Adenauer, Wolf was arrested in 1964, and indicted during the Sobibór trial with participating in the murder of 115,000 Jews. On 20 December 1966, the court in Hagen sentenced him to eight years in prison for taking part in the mass murder of "at least 39,000 Jews".

Wolf was not an SS-Officer, nor was he a member of the SS-Totenkopfverbände, which ceased to exist as a unit in 1940. The men of the extermination camp were under the command of the Sicherheitsdienst (SD). The guards in regular KZ/KL was under the command of SS-WVHA Amt D, which also was part of the Waffen-SS.

== Career ==
Little is known about his private life except that Wolf came from Krummau. He was in the Czechoslovak Army and in the German Wehrmacht, before he was posted to Hadamar Euthanasia Centre and the Heidelberg Psychiatric Clinic where the killing of patients deemed beyond the reach of therapy was taking place. In the name of science, Wolf photographed the mentally ill before they were gassed.

Together with his brother Josef Wolf (1900–1943), he was sent to Sobibór extermination camp in German occupied Poland sometime in early March 1943, as a specialist in euthanasia. The mass gassing operations at Sobibór were at full throttle already since mid-May 1942. In total, up to 200,000 (or more) mostly Jewish prisoners were murdered there. Wolf was in Sobibór until the prisoner uprising. He liked to hang around the victims' "barber shop" where his brother was a squad leader and watch naked women having their hair shorn off by the Sonderkommando. He supervised the sorting barracks where belongings of the victims were processed, but also led the Waldkommando forest brigade, cutting trees for the fuelling of corpse cremation pyres in the camp's killing zone.

== Arrest ==
Wolf was presented with an arrest warrant in 1964 at Eppelheim as one of a selected twelve former members of the SS camp personnel, which constituted about a quarter of the German staff there. The rest went on to live normal lives. In 1966 the court in Hagen sentenced Wolf to eight years in prison for his role as an overseer of a slave labour commando that sorted the belongings of victims already "processed". Wolf, in his work as the warehouse clerk, was charged with personally killing one Jew and with helping to murder an additional 115,000 Jews. He was found guilty of having assisted in the murder of "at least 39,000 Jews", a number chosen arbitrarily for judicial purposes. Sentenced to eight years in prison, Wolf, age 58 (at the time of his arrest), likely served at least a part of the sentence. This is all that is known about him, other than he lived somewhere in Bavaria. His brother, SS-Scharführer Josef Wolf, was killed in the Sobibór uprising.
