= Josef Oberhauser =

German commander (1915–1979)

- Josef Oberhauser at his trial
- Born: 20 September 1915; Munich, Bavaria, German Empire
- Died: 20 November 1979 (aged 64); Munich, West Germany
- Occupation: SS commander
- Known for: Crimes at the Bełżec extermination camp
- Status: Deceased
- Motive: Nazism
- Convictions: West Germany; Accessory to murder (450,000 counts); East Germany; Crimes against humanity Accessory to crimes against humanity
- Penalty: West Germany; 4.5 years imprisonment with hard labor East Germany; 15 years imprisonment

Josef Kaspar Oberhauser (20 September 1915 – 20 November 1979) was a low-ranking German SS commander during the Nazi era. He participated in Action T4 and Operation Reinhard. Oberhauser was the only person to be successfully convicted of crimes committed at the Belzec extermination camp. He was charged with 450,000 counts of accessory to murder and sentenced to 4.5 years imprisonment during the Belzec Trial of 1964.

== SS career ==
Oberhauser was born in Munich during World War I. After finishing Volksschule, he found employment on his uncle's farm in Markt Schwaben. In 1934, Oberhauser enlisted for 18 months in the Reichswehr and was posted to Munich. He joined the SS in November 1935, specifically joining the SS-Wachverbände (SS member no. 288,121). In April 1937, he was stationed at Sachsenhausen concentration camp. He was a member of the Nazi party. Oberhauser served in the "SS Leibstandarte Adolf Hitler".

=== Action T4 ===
In 1939, Oberhauser was assigned to Reichsarbeitsgemeinschaft für Heil- und Pflegeanstalten, part of the office for Action T4 and one of several front organizations of Hitler's Chancellery, in November 1939. This organization was responsible for the killing of approximately 100,000 mentally ill and disabled people during Action T4. At the killing centers of Grafeneck, Brandenburg and Bernburg, where these people were murdered en masse by gas (carbon monoxide poisoning), Oberhauser was a Brenner (burner), or Leichenbrenner (corpse burner): he was responsible for the burning of the bodies in the specially installed crematory ovens.

=== Operation Reinhard ===
Oberhauser (left), with Kurt Franz (right) and Jirmann (centre) at Belzec during Operation Reinhard

After finishing Action T4 in August 1941, in November Oberhauser was transferred to the staff of the SS and Police Leader (SSPF) for the Lublin district, SS-Brigadeführer Odilo Globocnik, to take part in Operation Reinhard, the extermination of Poland's three million Jews. From November 1941 until 1 August 1942, Oberhauser was posted to Bełżec extermination camp as the leader of a guard platoon. He first visited Bełżec in the fall of 1941, before the extermination camp existed, to remove military equipment at the site. He was responsible for the development of the camp. In December 1941, Oberhauser returned to Bełżec with construction materials and a team of Ukrainian Trawnikis. He was under the command of camp commandant Christian Wirth, and he also served as Wirth's liaison to Globocnik.

For his work in the implementation of Operation Reinhard, Oberhauser was promoted from SS-Hauptscharführer to SS-Untersturmführer, effective 20 April 1943, reaching officer rank in the SS. Previously, the Reichsführer-SS Heinrich Himmler had made a personal visit to the Operation Reinhard camps, including Bełżec, on 12 February 1943, and had decided to promote Oberhauser. In the 21 January 1965 judgment of the Munich District Court I (Case No. 110 Ks 3/64), his work at Belzec is described as follows (translated to English):

The defendant, Oberhauser, – then an SS-Oberscharführer – was on the staff of the senior SS and Police Leader in Lublin from November to Christmas 1941. Subsequently, he was assigned to work for the camp commandant of Belzec (Christian Wirth), which saw him appointed as liaison officer to the staff of the senior SS and Police Leader and moreover, unlike other non-commissioned officers, given no fixed area of responsibility within the camp; on the contrary, he was free to do as he personally saw fit. Consequently Oberhauser was often seen in Wirth's company within the camp, but no recognizable activity would have resulted nor would any independent authority have been exercised.

Only occasionally was Oberhauser given a role at the implementation of mass killings, the illegality of which he had fully recognized. For example, on the orders of the camp commandant, Wirth, he met trainloads arriving at Belzec, each comprising at least 150 people, at the camp gates on at least five occasions in the period from mid-March to 1st August 1942. He led the supervision of the unloading of the trains and made sure that the train crew did not enter the camp area but were held outside the camp in readiness, to be able to reinforce the outer cordon in case there was an uprising or desperate breakout attempt by the doomed people. All the Jews who arrived on these trains were killed in the manner already described.

When, in spring 1942, a major expansion of Belzec Camp was carried out to increase its capacity for extermination, it was the task of the defendant, to procure the necessary building materials, in particular, for the construction of the larger gas chamber facility. He was allocated vehicles and the people necessary for the fulfillment of this task. In exercising his duties, he was aware of the fact that the work carried out with his assistance, was intended to create the conditions for a significant increase in the numbers of those exterminated. On 1 August 1942, as inspector of the three extermination camps of Belzec, Treblinka and Sobibor, Wirth moved to his new office in Lublin, and succeeded in getting Oberhauser, whom he assessed as a dutiful subordinate, also transferred there. There, the defendant was given the command of the Ukrainian guards employed by the staff of the senior SS and Police Leader, Globocnik, to guard important sites in Lublin. In addition, he was still available to Wirth, and had to act as an escort on his inspection visits to the extermination camps.

— Belzec Trial - Sentence: LG Munich I dated 21 January 1965, 110 Ks 3/64. IV. The duties of the defendant in Belzec and Lublin.

=== Transfer to Italy ===
After the completion of Operation Reinhard, Oberhauser, along with many of his colleagues, was sent to northern Italy in the group Sonderabteilung Einsatz R to participate in anti-partisan warfare and the deportation and killing of Jews there. He was promoted to the rank of SS-Obersturmführer on 30 January 1945. Purportedly, Oberhauser was commandant of Risiera di San Sabba until its closure in late April 1945 (3,000 to 5,000 people died there). He then went to Austria with his unit, and was arrested by the British authorities in May 1945 in Bad Gastein.

== Arrest and trial ==
After his release, Oberhauser was employed as a sawmill worker in Bevensen. On 13 April 1948, he was arrested during a stay in the Soviet occupation zone. On 24 September 1948, he was convicted by the Soviet Military Administration in Germany of violating "Control Council Law No. 10" of 20 December 1945 (which also served as a basis at the Nuremberg Trials), by his membership in a criminal organization (the SS) and his killing of victims in Grafeneck, Brandenburg and Bernburg. Oberhauser was sentenced to 15 years in prison and 10 years deprivation of civil rights. He was granted an amnesty on 28 April 1956, and released after only 8 years. Following his release, Oberhauser served as a casual labourer, bartender and waiter in Munich.

In 1963 the Bełżec trial began and Oberhauser was one of 8 defendants charged with war crimes committed at the extermination camp. On 30 January 1964, all of the defendants but Oberhauser were acquitted due to the collapse of the prosecution case but re-arrested shortly thereafter. Oberhauser appeared before the court again in January 1965. He was found guilty of a number of charges, namely:

- Accessory to 300,000 cases (charged with 450,000) of collective murder;
- Five other crimes of aiding and abetting collective murder in each of 150 cases.

Oberhauser was sentenced to 4.5 years in prison with hard labor. He was released after serving half of his sentence. Oberhauser was sentenced to life imprisonment in absentia for his crimes committed in Italy, but the Italian extradition request failed. Oberhauser died on 22 November 1979 in Munich.

Oberhauser was unwillingly filmed while working at a beer bar in Munich for Claude Lanzmann's documentary Shoah, released in 1985. In the documentary he claims to have worked there for 20 years.

== Notes and references ==
- Jewish Virtual Library

== Bibliography ==
- Ernst Klee : Das Personenlexikon zum Dritten Reich. Fischer, Frankfurt, 2007. ISBN 978-3-596-16048-8. (updated 2nd edition)
- Ernst Klee : Was sie taten – Was sie wurden. Fischer Taschenbuch, Frankfurt, 1986, ISBN 3-596-24364-5
- Ernst Klee, Willi Dreßen, Volker Rieß: "Schöne Zeiten." S. Fischer Verlag, Frankfurt, 1988, ISBN 3-10-039304-X
- Claude Lanzmann: Shoah
