= Erich Fuchs =

Holocaust perpetrator (1913–1980)

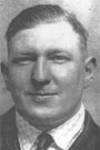
- Born: 9 April 1902; Berlin, German Empire
- Died: 25 July 1980 (aged 78); Koblenz, West Germany
- Military career
- Allegiance: Nazi Germany
- Branch: Schutzstaffel
- Rank: Scharführer
- Unit: Sobibor Treblinka
- Other work: Car sales man, truck driver.

Erich Fuchs (9 April 1902 – 25 July 1980) was an SS functionary who worked for the Action T4 mass-murder program, and for the Operation Reinhard phase of the Holocaust.

Fuchs was charged with war crimes at the Bełżec Trial in 1963–64, for which he was acquitted. As more evidence came to light, Fuchs was rearrested and tried at the Sobibor Trial in Hagen. He was charged with participation in the Holocaust and on 20 December 1966, found guilty of being an accessory to the mass murder of at least 79,000 people. Fuchs was sentenced to four years imprisonment.

== Life ==
Fuchs was born Erich Fritz Erhard Fuchs in Berlin. He began his career as a motor mechanic. He joined the Nazi Party and the SA in May 1933. Following the outbreak of World War II, in 1940 Fuchs was assigned to the clandestine Action T4 euthanasia program. He served as Dr. Irmfried Eberl's driver while Eberl was medical director of the T-4 killing centers at Brandenburg and Bernburg. Fuchs was present at many of the gassings of the disabled people. When the Final Solution was set in place at Wannsee, Fuchs was transferred to the newly built Bełżec extermination camp in German-occupied Poland for six weeks to install the killing apparatus there. He later testified:

Upon our arrival in Belzec, we met Friedel Schwarz and the other SS men, whose names I cannot remember. They supervised the construction of barracks that would serve as a gas chamber. Wirth told us that in Belzec "all the Jews will be struck down." For this purpose barracks were built as gas chambers. I installed shower heads in the gas chambers. The nozzles were not connected to any water pipes; they would serve as camouflage for the gas chamber. For the Jews who were gassed, it would seem as if they were being taken to baths and for disinfection.

After the successful installation of the gassing motor at Belzec, in April 1942 Fuchs was moved to the next secret construction site at the Sobibor extermination camp. The gas-fueled, two-hundred-horse-power engine was allocated for him already in nearby Lvov by the SS men of Operation Reinhard. He remained at Sobibór for at least four weeks. In Fuchs's own words:

Sometime in the spring of 1942 I received instructions from Wirth to fetch new camp staff from Lublin by lorry. One of these was Erich Bauer (also Stangl and one or two other people) ... On Wirth's instructions I left by lorry for Lemberg and collected a gassing engine there which I then took to Sobibor.

Upon arriving in Sobibor I discovered a piece of open ground close to the station on which there was a concrete building and several other permanent buildings. The SS-Sonderkommando at Sobibor was led by Thomalla. Amongst the SS personnel there were Floss, Bauer, Stangl, Schwarz, Barbl and others. We unloaded the motor. It was a heavy, Russian petrol engine (presumably a tank or tractor engine) of at least 200 HP (carburettor engine, eight-cylinder, water-cooled). We put the engine on a concrete plinth and attached a pipe to the exhaust outlet. Then we tried out the engine. At first it did not work. I repaired the ignition and the valve and suddenly the engine started. The chemist whom I already knew from Belzec went into the gas chamber with a measuring device in order to measure the gas concentration.

After this a test gassing was carried out. I seem to remember that thirty to forty women were gassed in a gas chamber. The Jewesses had to undress in a clearing in the wood which had been roofed over, near the gas chamber. They were herded into the gas chamber by the above-mentioned SS members and Ukrainian volunteers. When the women had been shut up in the gas chamber I attended to the engine together with Bauer. The engine immediately started ticking over. We both stood next to the engine and switched it up to "release exhaust to chamber" so that the gases were channelled into the chamber. On the instigation of the chemist I revved up the engine, which meant that no extra gas had to be added later. After about ten minutes the thirty to forty women were dead. The chemist and the SS gave the signal to turn off the engine.

While at Sobibor, Fuchs also operated this engine as it fed the gas chambers. Now an SS-Scharführer (Sergeant), Fuchs went to Treblinka extermination camp, under the command of his old boss Eberl. He would later testify:

Subsequently I went to Treblinka. In this extermination camp I installed a generator which supplied electric light for the barracks. The work in Treblinka took me about three to four busy months. During my stay there transports of Jews who were gassed were coming in daily.

Near the end of 1942, Fuchs returned briefly to Bernburg Euthanasia Centre. Then, from December to February 1943 he was stationed at Wiesloch psychiatric institution, where he was involved in "euthanasia research" and again, present during the gassing operations. In March 1943 Fuchs was removed from Action T4, and his work in mass murder and genocide was done.

After the war he worked as a lorry driver, motor mechanic and car salesman. Fuchs was put on trial at the Bełżec Trial in Munich 1963–64, for which he was acquitted. Fuchs was rearrested and tried at the Sobibor Trial in Hagen. He was charged with participation in the mass murder of approximately 3,600 Jews. On 20 December 1966, Fuchs was found guilty of being an accessory to the mass murder of at least 79,000 Jews and sentenced to four years imprisonment. Fuchs was married for the sixth time during the trial. Fuchs died on 25 July 1980 at the age of 78.
