= Ziem =

Ziem is a surname. Notable people with the surname include:

- Félix Ziem (1821–1911), French painter
- Steve Ziem (born 1961), American baseball player

== See also ==
- Ziemke
- Zim (disambiguation)
