= Kurt Bolender =

German Holocaust perpetrator (1912–1966)

Heinz Kurt Bolender
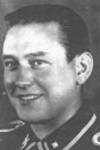
- Born: 21 May 1912; Duisburg, German Empire
- Died: 10 October 1966 (aged 54); Hagen, West Germany
- Cause of death: Suicide by hanging
- Military career
- Allegiance: Nazi Germany
- Branch: Schutzstaffel
- Service years: 1930s–1945
- Rank: Oberscharführer
- Unit: SS-Totenkopfverbände
- Commands: Operated gas chambers at Sobibór Camp III
- Awards: Iron Cross 2nd Class, War Merit Cross 2nd Class With Swords.

Kurt Bolender in SS uniform

Heinz Kurt Bolender (21 May 1912 – 10 October 1966) was an SS sergeant during the Nazi era. In 1942, he operated the gas chambers at Sobibór extermination camp, perpetrating acts of genocide against Jews and Romani people during Operation Reinhard. After the war, Bolender was recognized in 1961 while working under a false identity as a doorman at a nightclub in West Germany, and subsequently accused in 1965 of personally murdering at least 360 Jewish inmates and assisting in the murder of 86,000 more at Sobibór. He died by suicide in prison two months prior to the end of the trial.

== Biography ==
Bolender was born in 1912 in Duisburg and stayed in school until the age of 16 when he became a blacksmith apprentice. He joined the NSDAP in 1930. In 1939, he joined the SS-Totenkopfverbände ("Death's Head Unit"). He was attached to the Action T4 euthanasia program and worked at Hartheim, Hadamar, Brandenburg and Sonnenstein killing centers where physically and mentally disabled Germans were exterminated by gassing and lethal injection. Bolender was involved in the cremation process of disposing of victims, as well as "test" gassing procedures during the Action T4. During this period he worked with Franz Stangl and Christian Wirth. In 1941–1942 he was attached to an ambulance unit on the Eastern Front in Russia along with the other T-4 workers.

=== Sobibór extermination camp ===
Bolender served at Sobibor extermination camp from April to August 1942, where he was one of the most feared SS officers. He was the commander of Sobibor's extermination area and he personally supervised gassings and cremations. He was entrusted with this job due to his prior working relationship with Sobibor commandant Franz Stangl.

SS-Scharführer Erich Fuchs, who served with Bolender, testified about him in 1966:

About thirty to forty women were gassed in one gas chamber. The Jewish women were forced to undress in an open place close to the gas chamber, and were driven into the gas chamber by SS members and the Ukrainian auxiliaries. When the women were shut up in the gas chamber I and Bolender set the motor in motion. About ten minutes later the thirty to forty women were dead.

Part of Bolender's duties included supervision of the Jewish work details in Lager III. In his own words:

I assigned the Arbeitsjuden ("worker Jews") to different groups: some had to empty out the gas chamber after the cremation was completed; others had to transport the dead bodies to the graves.

SS-Oberscharführer Erich Bauer, who also served with Bolender at Sobibór, testified about him in 1966:

Bolender was in charge of Camp III. In Sobibor there was a working Jew whom Bolender ordered to box with another working Jew, and for his pleasure they hit each other almost until death. Bolender had a big dog, and when he was in charge of the platform workers, he set the dog at the Jews who did not work quickly enough.

Also, according to Bauer, Bolender participated in gang rapes of female prisoners prior to killing them:

I was blamed for being responsible for the death of the Jewish girls Ruth and Gisela, who lived in the so-called forester house. As it is known, these two girls lived in the forester house, and they were visited frequently by the SS men. Orgies were conducted there. They were attended by Bolender, [Hubert] Gomerski, Karl Ludwig, Franz Stangl, Gustav Wagner, and Steubel. I lived in the room above them and due to these celebrations could not fall asleep after coming back from a journey....

In 1965, Ada Lichtman, a Sobibór survivor, described Bolender and his dog:

Paul Groth and Kurt Bolender would take Barry (the dog) with them. The dog would walk quietly by their side, but when his master turned to one of the people and asked, "So you don't want to work?" Barry would launch himself at the person, biting the flesh, tearing at it and pulling off chunks of it.

In fall 1942, Bolender became the commander of the Ukrainian camp guards at Sobibór. Moshe Bahir, a Sobibór survivor, wrote about Bolender:

It is hard to forget Oberscharführer Kurt Bolender, with his athletic body and long hair, who used to go walking half naked, clad only in training breeches, carrying a long whip with which he brutally lashed the camp prisoners whom he came upon on his way. On his way to lunch he was in the habit of passing the main gate and swinging a whip with all his strength upon the heads of the Jews who went through. Once, when I was still working in the platform commando, the group was accused of carelessness when we had left a window open on one of the train cars. Each one of us was punished with 100 lashes. Bolender was very active in this task. More than once I saw him throwing babies, children, and the sick straight from the freight cars into the trolley with the load that went to the Lazarett [execution pits disguised as a field hospital]. He was the one who chose the ten men to deliver the food to the workers in Camp III. When he had a yen to accompany the group, not one of them would return to us when the task was done.

In December 1942, Bolender's duties at Sobibór were temporarily put on hold when he was sent to prison for intimidating a witness involved in his divorce. After serving the sentence, Bolender returned to Operation Reinhard, where he assisted in the dismantlement and liquidation of Sobibor. Afterwards he served at the SS labor camp at Dorohucza and subsequently to Trieste in Italy. On 18 January 1945, Bolender was awarded the Iron Cross 2nd class.

=== Arrest and trial and suicide ===
After World War II, Bolender assumed a fake identity, did not contact his family or his relatives, and after some time, had himself declared deceased. He was recognized in May 1961 working as a bouncer at a nightclub in Germany and was immediately arrested. He was arrested under an assumed name Heinz Brenner. It is probable that after the war he also went by the pseudonym Wilhelm Kurt Vahle while working as a bouncer at the Er- und Siebar and the Hofbräuhaus in Hamburg. At his residence police found a whip with the silver initials "KB", the inscription that was created at the camp by Sobibór survivor Stanisław Szmajzner.

In 1965, Bolender, along with 11 former SS guards from Sobibór, was tried in Hagen, West Germany. At the trial Bolender initially claimed that he had never been in Sobibór, but instead fought against partisans around Lublin, Poland. However, he broke down under cross-examination and confessed to being present at Sobibór.

Prior to the completion of the trial, Kurt Bolender died from suicide by hanging in his prison cell. In his suicide note, he insisted that he was innocent.

== See also ==
- List of people who died by suicide by hanging
