= Ernst Zierke =

- Ernst Zierke with German police unit in Italy
- Born: 6 May 1905; Köslin, Kingdom of Prussia, German Empire
- Died: 23 May 1972 (aged 67); Celle, Lower Saxony, West Germany
- Military career
- Allegiance: Nazi Germany
- Branch: Schutzstaffel
- Rank: Unterscharführer (Junior section leader)
- Units: Bełżec Dorohucza Sobibor Camp III

Ernst Zierke (6 May 1905 – 23 May 1972) was a low-ranking member in the SS who took part in the Aktion T4 forced euthanasia program in Nazi Germany, and after the invasion of Poland worked at Bełżec and Sobibór extermination camps during Operation Reinhard. Zierke helped to perpetrate the Holocaust. He was charged with being an accessory to the murder of 360,000 Jews at death camps, acquitted twice, in the Belzec and Sobibor trials of 1965 on grounds of acting under duress and set free.

== Career ==
Zierke was born on 6 May 1905 in Köslin. His father, a railroad worker, died in 1917. Zierke joined the Nazi Party and SA in 1930. He trained as a nurse at the Neuruppin hospital and eventually received a permanent civil service appointment. In late 1939, he was recruited by Action T4 and worked as staff in the euthanasia program at both the Grafeneck and Hadamar gassing centers. Zierke was transferred to Eichberg euthanasia center in late 1941. From January to March 1942, he was part of T4's Organisation Todt in the Soviet Union, then returned to Eichberg.

=== Death camp service ===
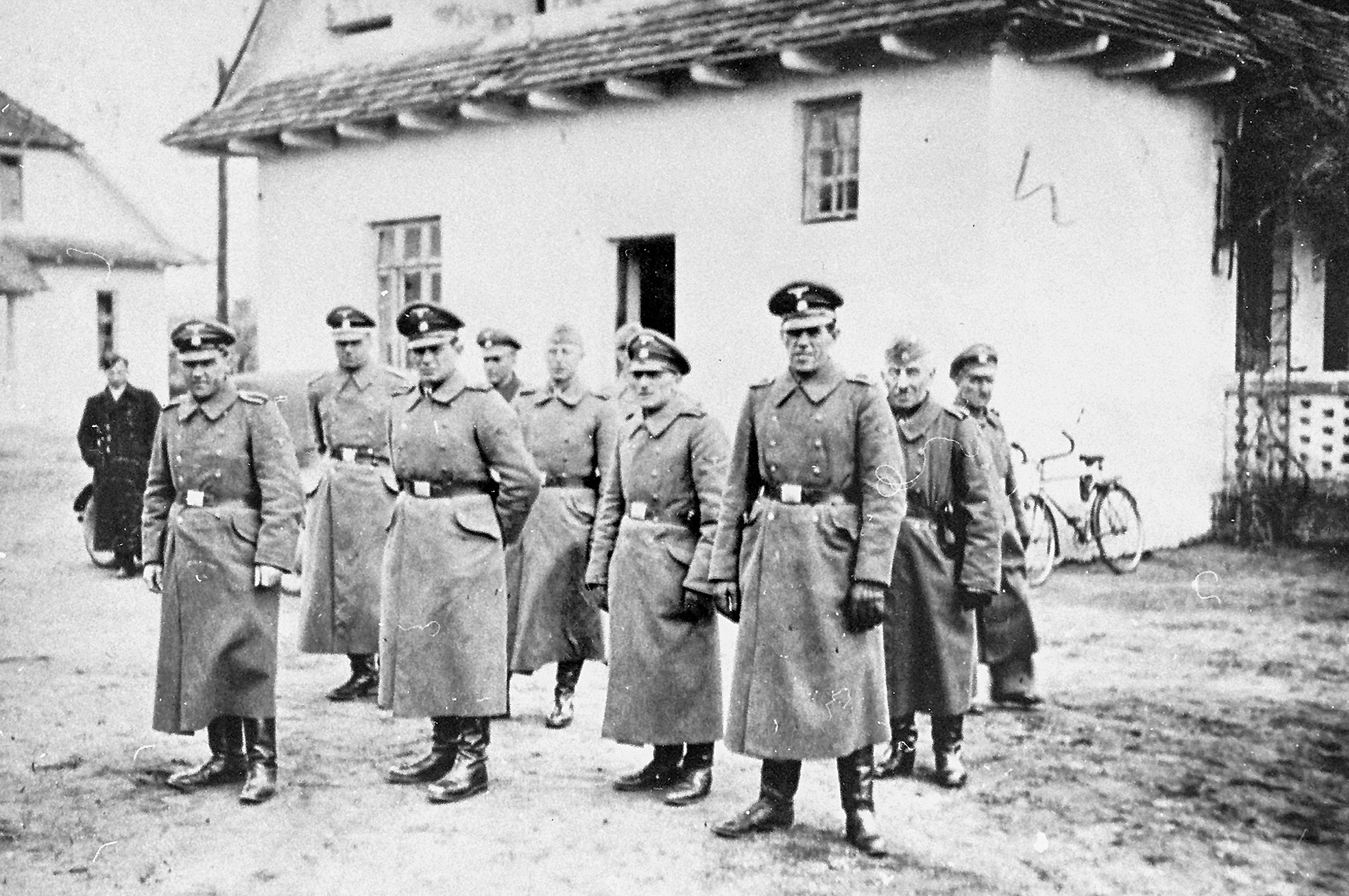
Zierke, fourth from right, as SS staff of Bełżec extermination camp

From June 1942 to March 1943 he was a member of the Bełżec extermination camp staff. At Bełżec, Zierke worked primarily on the unloading ramp of arriving transports and supervised the undressing of the victims prior to them entering the gas chambers. He then worked briefly at the Dorohucza transit camp, from which he was sent to Sobibór extermination camp on 5 November 1943. Zierke's final task at Sobibor was to supervise the dismantling of the camp's structures. He participated in the mass murder of the last group of more than thirty commando Jews (Arbeitsjuden) who had dismantled the camp at Sobibor. In the hands-on killings, Zierke was aided by SS-Unterscharführer Erich Sporleder, and SS-Scharführer Robert Jührs.

In December 1943 he was ordered to Italy to serve with Globocnik (his death camp superior), at Risiera di San Sabba camp complex. After the end of the war Zierke was arrested in a POW camp and released. He became a saw mill worker. Zierke was rearrested on 31 January 1963 in West Germany along with a group of Holocaust perpetrators facing trial. He was acquitted twice, both at the Bełżec Trial in Munich in 1964, and at the Sobibor Trial in Hagen (1965). He was released from custody a free man, and died of health complications in Celle eight years later.
