= Glenn Ziemke =

American sculptor and glassblower

- Born: 1956 (age 69–70)
- Education: Pennsylvania State University
- Occupation: Glassblowing
- Years active: 1976–2022

Glenn Ziemke (born 1956) is an American former sculptor and glassblower. He began glassblowing in 1976 and continued in the business for 46 years. He retired in 2022.

== Career ==
Ziemke began glassblowing while a student at Pennsylvania State University in 1976. After graduating in 1978, he served a one-year apprenticeship. The following year, he opened his first studio in Accord, New York. After two years at that location, followed by fourteen more in Freeport, Maine, in 1995 he built a new property, Ziemke Glassblowing Studio, on Route 100, the Waterbury-Stowe Road, in Waterbury Center, Vermont.

In September 2010, he organized the inaugural Route 100 Glassblowers Open Studio Weekend.

Ziemke appeared in a season-four episode of HGTV's That's Clever!

He retired in May 2022, citing physical exhaustion from almost three decades beside a furnace.

Ziemke is also a musician, and has been songwriting for much of his life.
