= Herbert Floss =

Sobibor extermination camp officer (1912–1943)

- Born: 25 August 1912; Reinholdshain, German Empire
- Died: 22 October 1943 (aged 31) Zawadówka, German-occupied Poland
- Allegiance: Nazi Germany
- Branch: Schutzstaffel
- Rank: Scharführer

Herbert Floss or Herbert Floß (25 August 1912 – 22 October 1943) was an SS functionary of Nazi Germany who served as acting commander of the Sobibor extermination camp during the Holocaust in Poland. He also served as cremation expert in Camp II Totenlager at the Treblinka extermination camp.

Floss joined the NSDAP in 1930, the SA in 1931, and the SS in 1935. He served at Sobibor from its establishment in April 1942 until the uprising on 14 October 1943. Before entering service in Sobibor, Floss was stationed in Buchenwald and several euthanasia centres. In the early period of Sobibor, Floss was the acting commander for a few weeks until he was succeeded by Gustav Wagner. Before the victims went into the gas chambers, he took their last possessions from them. According to Erich Fuchs, Floss participated in the trial gassing of several dozen Jewish women at Sobibor.

Fellow Treblinka SS officer Heinrich Matthes described this period: "Floss arrived at this time [November 1942], who, so I presume, must previously have been in another camp. He then had the installation built for burning the corpses. The incineration was carried out by placing railroad rails on blocks of concrete. The corpses were then piled up on these rails. Brush wood was placed under the rails. The wood was drenched with gasoline. Not only the newly obtained corpses were burnt in this way, but also those exhumed from the ditches."

By the end of July 1943, the Jewish "death brigade" in Camp II, supervised by Floss, had cremated about 700,000 corpses. At Sobibor Floss trained the Ukrainian guards. One week after the uprising he accompanied a group of them to Lublin. When the train was near Chełm he was overpowered and shot with his own machine pistol.

== See also ==
- Treblinka Trials
