= Zemke =

Zemke is a surname. Notable people with the surname include:

- Adam Zemke (born 1983), American politician
- Hubert Zemke (1914–1994), American pilot
- Jake Zemke (born 1975), American road racer
- Janusz Zemke (born 1949), Polish politician
- Jens Zemke (born 1966), German racing cyclist
