= Erich Bauer =

Holocaust perpetrator (1900–1980)

- Bauer in Ordnungspolizei uniform
- Born: Hermann Erich Bauer; 26 March 1900; Berlin, German Empire
- Died: 4 February 1980 (aged 79); Tegel Prison, West Berlin, West Germany
- Status: Deceased
- Conviction: Crimes against humanity
- Penalty: Death; commuted to life imprisonment
- Military career
- Branch: German Army; Schutzstaffel
- Service years: German Empire (to 1918); Nazi Germany
- Rank: Mannschaften (to 1918); SS-Oberscharführer
- Nicknames: Gasmeister ("Gas Master"), Badmeister ("Bath Master")
- Commands: Operated gas chambers at Sobibór Camp III; lorry driver
- Conflicts: World War I World War II
- Awards: 1914 Iron Cross II class Honor Cross 1914–1918; SA Sports Badge
- Other work: Tram conductor, laborer

Erich Bauer (26 March 1900 – 4 February 1980), sometimes referred to as "Gasmeister", was a low-level commander in the Schutzstaffel (SS) of Nazi Germany and a Holocaust perpetrator. He participated in Action T4 program and later in Operation Reinhard, when he was a gas chamber operator at Sobibór extermination camp. In 1950 he was sentenced to death, later commuted to life imprisonment.

== Biography ==
Erich Bauer was born in Berlin on 26 March 1900. He served as a soldier in World War I and was captured as a prisoner of war by the French.

After returning to Germany, Bauer finally found work as a tram conductor. In 1933, he joined the Nazi Party (NSDAP) and Sturmabteilung (SA).

=== Action T4 ===
In 1940, Bauer was assigned to the T4 Euthanasia Program, in which physically and mentally disabled people in institutions were killed by gassing and lethal injection. In the beginning, he worked as a driver, sometimes collecting and transporting people from hospitals or homes, but he was quickly promoted. Erich Bauer testified to one of his first mass murders:

A pipe connected the exhaust of a car to a bricked-up laboratory in the asylum. A few patients were shut into the room and I turned on the car engine. This killed the patients in eight minutes.

=== Sobibór ===
In early 1942, Bauer was transferred to the office of Odilo Globocnik, the SS and Police Leader of Lublin, Poland. Bauer was given an SS uniform and promoted to the rank of Oberscharfuhrer (Staff Sergeant). In April 1942, he was dispatched to the Sobibór death camp. He worked there until the camp's liquidation in December 1943, following a revolt by prisoners in October 1943.

At Sobibór, Bauer was in charge of the camp's gas chambers. At the time the Jews called him the Badmeister ("Bath Master"). After the war, he was referred to by survivors as the Gasmeister ("Gas Master"). He was described as a short, stocky man, a known drinker who regularly overindulged. He kept a private bar in his room. While other SS guards were neatly dressed, Bauer was different: he was always filthy and unkempt, with a stench of alcohol and chlorine emanating from him. In his room, he had a photograph on the wall of himself and a photo of all of his family with the Führer. It reportedly took the victims up to half an hour to die, and the SS kept a flock of geese to drown out the screams of those who were dying.

On 14 October 1943, the day of the Sobibór uprising, Bauer unexpectedly drove out to Chełm for supplies. The resistance almost postponed the uprising since Bauer was at the top of the "death list" of SS guards to be assassinated prior to the escape that was created by the leader of the revolt, Alexander Pechersky. The revolt had to start earlier than planned because Bauer had returned earlier from Chełm than expected. When he discovered that SS-Oberscharführer Rudolf Beckmann was dead, Bauer started shooting at the two Jewish prisoners unloading his truck. The sound of the gunfire prompted Pechersky to begin the revolt early.

=== After the war ===
At the end of the war, Bauer was arrested in Austria by the Americans and confined to a prisoner of war camp until 1946. Shortly afterward, he returned to Berlin, where he found employment as a laborer cleaning up debris from the war.

Bauer was arrested in 1949 when two former Jewish prisoners from Sobibór, Samuel Lerer and Esther Raab, recognized him during a chance encounter at a Kreuzberg fairground. When Raab confronted Bauer at the fair, the former SS man reportedly said, "How is it that you are still alive?" He was arrested soon afterwards and his trial started the following year.

During the course of his trial, Bauer maintained that at Sobibór he worked only as a truck driver, collecting the necessary supplies for the camp's inmates and the German and Ukrainian guards. He admitted being aware of the mass murders at Sobibór, but claimed to have never taken any part in them, nor engaged in any acts of cruelty. His primary witnesses, former Sobibór guards SS-Oberscharführer Hubert Gomerski and SS-Untersturmführer Johann Klier, testified on his behalf.

The court, however, convicted Bauer based on the testimony of four Jewish witnesses who had managed to escape from Sobibór. They identified Bauer as the former Sobibór Gasmeister, who not only operated the gas chambers in the camp, but also engaged in mass executions by shooting. In addition, they said he committed a variety of particularly vicious and random acts of cruelty against camp inmates and victims on their way to the gas chambers.

On 8 May 1950 the court, Schwurgericht Moabit, sentenced Bauer to death for crimes against humanity. Since capital punishment had been abolished in West Germany by that point, Bauer's sentence was commuted to life imprisonment. He served 21 years in Alt-Moabit Prison in Berlin, before being transferred to Tegel Prison. During his imprisonment, he admitted to his participation in mass murder at Sobibór and occasionally testified against former SS colleagues, such as at the Sobibor trial. Bauer died in 1980 in Tegel Prison.
