= Franz Stangl =

Austrian war criminal (1908–1971)

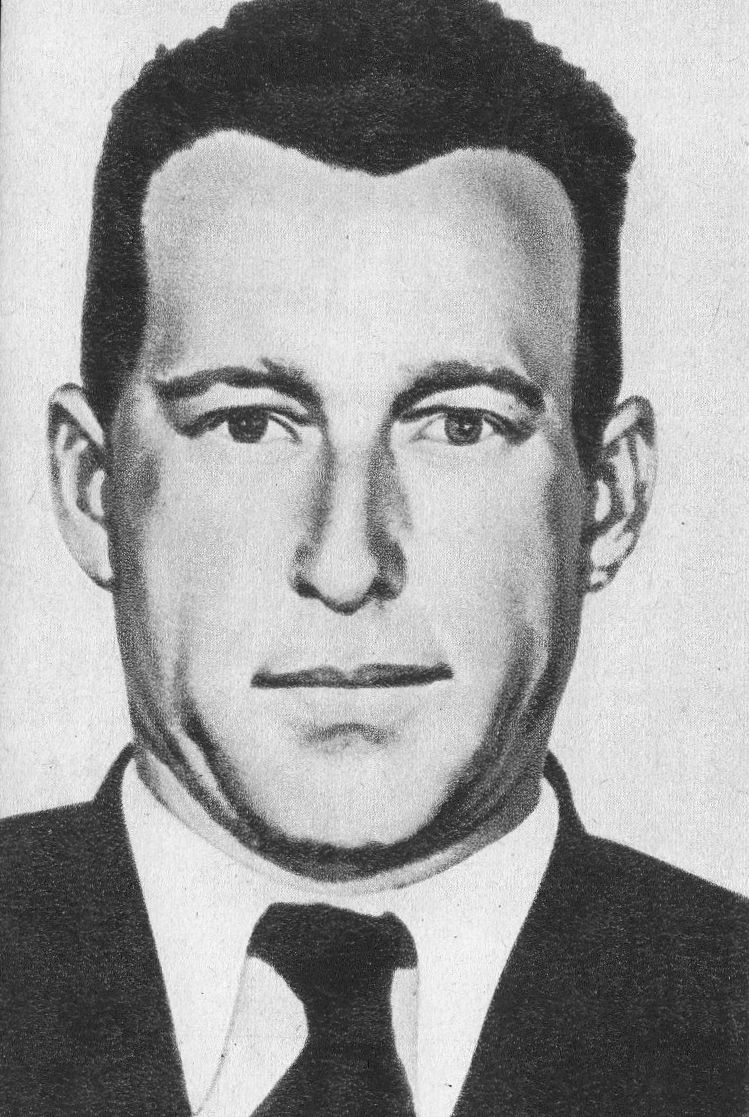
- Born: Franz Paul Stangl; 26 March 1908; Altmünster, Austria-Hungary
- Died: 28 June 1971 (aged 63); Düsseldorf, West Germany
- Military career
- Allegiance: Nazi Germany
- Branch: Schutzstaffel
- Service years: 1931–1945
- Rank: SS-Hauptsturmführer
- Service number: NSDAP #6,370,447; SS #296,569
- Unit: SS-Totenkopfverbände
- Commands: Sobibor, 28 April 1942 – 30 August 1942 Treblinka, 1 September 1942 – August 1943

Franz Paul Stangl (German: [ˈʃtaŋl̩]; 26 March 1908 – 28 June 1971) was an Austrian police officer and commandant of the Nazi extermination camps Sobibor and Treblinka in World War II.

Stangl, an employee of the T-4 Euthanasia Program and an SS commander in Nazi Germany, became commandant of the camps during the Operation Reinhard phase of the Holocaust. After the war he fled to Brazil for 16 years. In those 16 years he worked for Volkswagen do Brasil before he was arrested in 1967, extradited to West Germany, and tried there for the mass murder of one million people. In 1970, he was found guilty and sentenced to the maximum penalty, life imprisonment. He died of heart failure six months later.

== Early life and Nazi affiliations ==
Stangl was born in 1908 in Altmünster, located in the Salzkammergut region of Austria. He was the son of a night watchman and had such an emotionally distressing relationship with his father that he was deeply frightened by and hated the sight of the elder Stangl's Habsburg Dragoons uniform. Stangl later said his father had died of malnutrition in 1916. To help support his family, Franz learned to play the zither and earned money giving zither lessons. Stangl completed his public schooling in 1923.

In his teens, he secured an apprenticeship as a weaver, qualifying as a master weaver in 1927. Concerned that this trade offered few opportunities for advancement – and having observed the poor health of his co-workers – Stangl sought a new career. He moved to Innsbruck in 1930 and applied for an appointment in the Austrian federal police. Stangl later suggested that he liked the security and cleanliness that the police uniforms represented to him. He was accepted in early 1931 and trained for two years at the federal police academy in Linz.

Stangl became a member of the Austrian Nazi Party in 1931 when it was an illegal association for an Austrian police officer at that time. After the war he denied having been a Nazi since 1931 and claimed that he had enrolled as member of the party only to avoid arrest following the Anschluss of Austria into Nazi Germany in May 1938. Records suggest that Stangl contributed to a Nazi aid fund but he disavowed knowing about the intended party purpose of the fund. Stangl had Nazi Party number 6,370,447 and SS number 296,569.

In 1935, Stangl was accepted into the Kriminalpolizei as a detective in the Austrian town of Wels. After Austria's Anschluss, Stangl was assigned to the Schutzpolizei (which was taken over by the Gestapo) in Linz, where he was posted to the Jewish Bureau (German: Judenreferat). Stangl joined the SS in May 1938. He ultimately reached the rank of SS-Hauptsturmführer (Captain).

== T-4 Euthanasia program, 1940 – March 1943 ==
After the onset of World War II, in early 1940, Stangl was instructed to report for work at the Public Service Foundation for Institutional Care (Gemeinnützige Stiftung für Anstaltspflege), a front organization of the T-4 Euthanasia Program. Stangl purposely solicited for a job in the newly created T-4 program in order to escape difficulties with his boss in the Linz Gestapo. He travelled to the RSHA in Berlin, where he was received by Paul Werner, who offered Stangl a job as supervisor in charge of security at a T-4 facility, and in the language commonly used during recruitment, described Action T4 as a "humanitarian" effort that was "essential, legal, and secret". Next Stangl met with Viktor Brack, who offered him a choice of work between Hartheim and Sonnenstein killing centres; Stangl picked Hartheim, which was near Linz.

Through a direct order from Reichsführer-SS Heinrich Himmler issued in November 1940, Stangl became the deputy office manager (Police Superintendent) of the T-4 Euthanasia Program at Hartheim Euthanasia Centre, and in late summer 1941 at Bernburg Euthanasia Centre, where people with mental and physical disabilities, as well as political prisoners, were sent to be killed.

At Hartheim, Stangl served under Christian Wirth as an assistant supervisor in charge of security. When Wirth was succeeded by Franz Reichleitner, Stangl stayed on as Reichleitner's deputy. During his brief posting at Bernburg Euthanasia Centre, Stangl reorganized the office at that T-4 facility. In March 1942, Stangl was given a choice to either return to the Linz Gestapo or to be transferred to Lublin for work in Operation Reinhard; Stangl accepted the transfer to Lublin in the General Government, where he would manage Operation Reinhard under Odilo Globočnik.

== Extermination camps ==
=== Sobibor, April – August 1942 ===
Stangl was appointed by Reichsführer-SS Heinrich Himmler to be the first commandant of Sobibor extermination camp. Stangl was Sobibor's commandant from 28 April until the end of August 1942, at the rank of SS-Obersturmführer. He claimed that Odilo Globočnik had initially suggested that Sobibor was merely a supply camp for the army and that the true nature of the camp became known to him only when he himself discovered a gas chamber hidden in the woods. Globočnik told him that if the Jews "were not working hard enough" he was fully permitted to kill them and that Globočnik would send "new ones".

Stangl studied the camp operations and management of Bełżec, which had commenced extermination activity. He then accelerated the completion of Sobibor. Around that time Stangl also had further dealings with Wirth, who was running extermination camps at Bełżec and Chelmno. Between 16 and 18 May 1942, Sobibor became fully operational. However, Stangl quickly realized that the extermination process was being encumbered by constant turnover among its prisoner labor force. He ended arbitrary culling of "work Jews" and established semi-permanent work teams, each overseen by a kapo. In the three months before Stangl was transferred to Treblinka, Yitzak Arad estimates that 90,000 Jews were killed at Sobibor.

Stangl avoided interacting with his victims, and he was rarely seen except when he greeted arriving prisoner transports. On these occasions he stood out because of the all-white linen riding coat he would wear, an affectation which earned him the nickname "White Death". Prisoners who did interact with him regarded him as one of the "moderates" among the camp staff. He was only ever accused of a single act of hands-on violence, and on one occasion, he convened a meeting to address what he regarded as Kurt Bolender's "bullying" of the Sonderkommando prisoners working in the extermination area. Stangl took an interest in one prisoner, Shlomo Szmajzner, who was forced to make gold jewelry for the SS officers. After the war, Szmajzner recalled Stangl as an arrogant man who stood out for "his obvious pleasure in his work and his situation. None of the others – although they were, in different ways, so much worse than he – showed this to such an extent. He had this perpetual smile on his face."

Around 100,000 Jews are believed to have been killed there while Stangl was the administrator until the furnaces broke down in October, by which time Stangl had left. Stangl was succeeded as Sobibor commandant by his Hartheim Euthanasia Center colleague, Franz Reichleitner. Erich Bauer later remarked:

I estimate that the number of Jews gassed at Sobibor was about 350,000. In the canteen at Sobibor I once overheard a conversation between Karl Frenzel, Franz Stangl and Gustav Wagner. They were discussing the number of victims in the extermination camps of Belzec, Treblinka and Sobibor and expressed their regret that Sobibor "came last" in the competition.

Also according to Bauer, Stangl participated in gang rapes of female prisoners prior to killing them:

I was blamed for being responsible for the death of the Jewish girls Ruth and Gisela, who lived in the so-called forester house. As it is known, these two girls lived in the forester house, and they were visited frequently by the SS men. Orgies were conducted there. They were attended by [Kurt] Bolender, [Hubert] Gomerski, Karl Ludwig, Franz Stangl, Gustav Wagner, and Steubel. I lived in the room above them and due to these celebrations could not fall asleep after coming back from a journey....

=== Treblinka, September 1942 – August 1943 ===
On 28 August 1942, Odilo Globočnik ordered Stangl to become Kommandant at the newly opened but disorganized death camp, Treblinka, then under the incompetent command of Irmfried Eberl. Globočnik trusted that Stangl could restore order at Treblinka, since Stangl had a reputation as a highly competent administrator and people manager with an excellent grasp of detail.

Stangl assumed command of Treblinka on 1 September 1942. Stangl wanted his camp to look attractive, so he ordered the paths paved and flowers planted along the sides of Seidel Street, near camp headquarters and SS living quarters. Despite being directly responsible for the camp's operations, Stangl said he limited his contact with Jewish prisoners as much as possible. Stangl rarely intervened with unusually cruel acts (other than gassing) perpetrated by his subordinate officers at the camp. He usually wore a white uniform and carried a whip, which caused prisoners to nickname him the "White Death".

Stangl claimed while in prison that his dedication had nothing to do with ideology or hatred of Jews. He said he matter-of-factly viewed the prisoners as material objects rather than people, including their extermination: "That was my profession. I enjoyed it. It fulfilled me. And yes, I was ambitious about that, I won't deny it." Stangl accepted and grew accustomed to the killings, perceiving prisoners not as humans but merely as "cargo" that must be destroyed. Stangl accepted the extermination of the Jews as a fact. At about this time, Stangl began drinking heavily. He is quoted as saying:

To tell the truth, one did become used to it ... they were cargo. I think it started the day I first saw the Totenlager [extermination area] in Treblinka. I remember Wirth standing there, next to the pits full of black-blue corpses. It had nothing to do with humanity – it could not have. It was a mass — a mass of rotting flesh. Wirth said "What shall we do with this garbage?" I think unconsciously that started me thinking of them as cargo ... I rarely saw them as individuals. It was always a huge mass. I sometimes stood on the wall and saw them in the "tube" – they were naked, packed together, running, being driven with whips...

In September 1942, Stangl supervised the building of new, larger gas chambers to augment the existing gas chambers. The new gas chambers became operational in early autumn 1942. It is believed that these death chambers were capable of killing 3,000 people in two hours, and 12,000 to 15,000 victims easily every day, with a maximum capacity of 22,000 deaths in 24 hours. According to Jankiel Wiernik: "When the new gas chambers were completed, the Hauptsturmführer [Stangl] came and remarked to the SS men who were with him: 'Finally the Jewish city is ready' (German: Endlich ist die Judenstadt fertig)".

=== Trieste, August 1943–1945 ===
In August 1943, along with Globočnik, Stangl was transferred to Trieste, where he helped organize the campaign against Yugoslav partisans and local Jews. Due to illness, he returned to Vienna in early 1945.

== Post-war escape, 1945–1961 ==
At the end of the war, Stangl fled without concealing his name. He was detained by the United States Army in 1945 and was briefly imprisoned in Linz, Austria, in 1947, pending investigation. He was suspected of complicity in the T-4 euthanasia programme. On 30 May 1948, he escaped to Italy with his colleague from Sobibor, SS sergeant Gustav Wagner. Austrian Roman Catholic Bishop Alois Hudal, a Nazi sympathizer, who would be forced to resign by the Vatican in 1952, helped Stangl to escape through a "ratline", and he reached Syria using a Red Cross passport. Stangl was joined by his wife and family, and lived in Syria for three years. In 1951, they moved to Brazil. After years in other jobs, he found work with the help of friends, at the Volkswagen do Brasil plant in São Bernardo do Campo, still using his own name.

According to Brazilian Holocaust survivor, Gabriel Waldman, he dated Stangl's daughter while in Brazil, not knowing her father was an SS agent.

== Arrest, trial, and death ==
Although Stangl's role in the mass murder of men, women and children was known to the Austrian authorities, a warrant for his arrest was not issued until 1961. During his escape, in Italy, he briefly changed his name in order to obtain Red cross traveling documents. Bishop Alois Hudal was the one who helped him. Upon arriving to Brasil, he again changed his name to Franz. Despite being registered under his real name at the Austrian consulate in São Paulo, it took another six years before he was tracked by Nazi hunter Simon Wiesenthal and arrested by Brazilian federal police on 28 February 1967. He never used an assumed name during his escape, and it is not clear why it took so long to apprehend him. After his extradition to West Germany by Brazilian authorities, he was tried for the deaths of around 1,000,000 people. He admitted to these killings but argued: "My conscience is clear. I was simply doing my duty..." Stangl's attempt to justify his actions as non-criminal in the face of German law was quoted by Arad:

What I had to do while I continued my efforts to get out was to limit my own actions to what I – in my own conscience – could answer for. At police training school they taught us that the definition of a crime must meet four requirements: there has to be a subject, an object, an action and intent. If any of these four elements is missing, then we are not dealing with a punishable offence ... I could apply this to my own situation – if the subject was the government, the "object" the Jews, and the action the gassing, I could tell myself that for me, the fourth element, "intent", (I called it free will) was missing.

Philosopher John Kekes discussed Stangl and the degree of his responsibility for war crimes in chapter 4 of his book The Roots of Evil. The Schwurgericht Düsseldorf court found Stangl guilty on 22 December 1970 and sentenced him to the maximum penalty, life imprisonment. While in prison, Stangl was interviewed extensively by Gitta Sereny for a study of him, published under the title Into That Darkness. Sereny wrote, quoting him:

"My conscience is clear about what I did, myself", he said, in the same stiffly spoken words he had used countless times at his trial, and in the past weeks, when we had always come back to this subject, over and over again. But this time I said nothing. He paused and waited, but the room remained silent. "I have never intentionally hurt anyone, myself," he said, with a different, less incisive emphasis, and waited again – for a long time. For the first time, in all these many days, I had given him no help. There was no more time. He gripped the table with both hands as if he was holding on to it. "But I was there", he said then, in a curiously dry and tired tone of resignation. These few sentences had taken almost half an hour to pronounce. "So yes," he said finally, very quietly, "in reality I share the guilt ... Because my guilt ... my guilt ... only now in these talks ... now that I have talked about it all for the first time..." He stopped.

During his prison interview, Sereny later wrote:

Stangl had pronounced the words "my guilt": but more than the words, the finality of it was in the sagging of his body, and on his face. After more than a minute he started again, a half-hearted attempt, in a dull voice. "My guilt," he said, "is that I am still here. That is my guilt."

On 28 June 1971, 19 hours after the conclusion of that interview, Stangl died of heart failure in a Düsseldorf prison.

== See also ==
- Glossary of Nazi Germany
- List of Nazi Party leaders and officials
- List of SS personnel
- Nazism in the Americas

== Notes ==
=== Works cited ===
- Schelvis, Jules (2007). Sobibor: A History of a Nazi Death Camp. Berg, Oxford & New Cork. ISBN 978-1-84520-419-8.
- Sereny, Gitta (1974). Into That Darkness: from Mercy Killing to Mass Murder. McGraw-Hill. ISBN 0-07-056290-3.
- Webb, Chris (2016). Sobibor Death Camp: History, Biographies, Remembrance. Columbia University Press. ISBN 978-3-8382-6966-5.

Military offices
Preceded by none	Commandant of Sobibor extermination camp 28 April 1942 – 30 August 1942	Succeeded by SS-Obersturmführer Franz Reichleitner
Preceded by SS-Obersturmführer Irmfried Eberl	Commandant of Treblinka extermination camp 1 September 1942 – August 1943	Succeeded by SS-Untersturmführer Kurt Franz
