= Scharführer =

German military title or rank

- Gorget patch

- Shoulder and camo insignia
- Country: Nazi Germany
- Service branch: Schutzstaffel; Sturmabteilung; National Socialist Motor Corps; National Socialist Flyers Corps
- Abbreviation: Scharf
- Formation: 1921
- Abolished: 1945
- Next higher rank: Oberscharführer
- Next lower rank: Unterscharführer
- Equivalent ranks: Unterfeldwebel

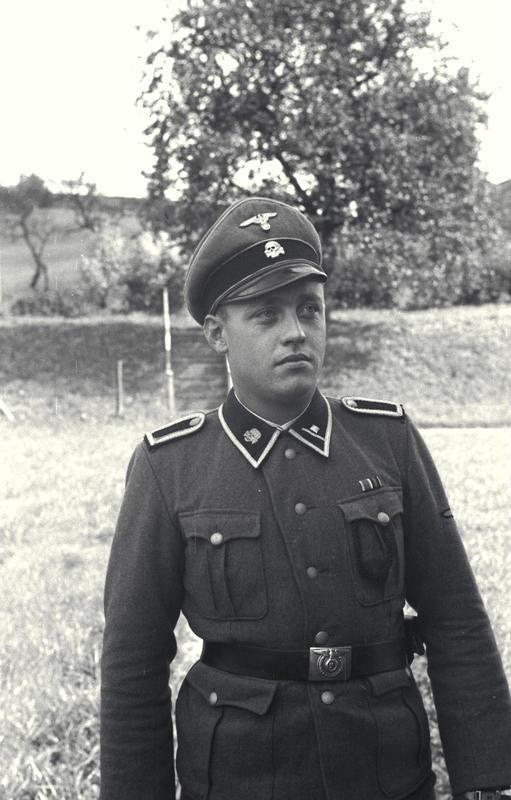
An SS-Scharführer serving in KZ Mauthausen

Scharführer ([ˈʃaːɐ̯fyːʁɐ], lit. 'Squad leader') was a title or rank used in early 20th century German military terminology. In German, Schar was one term for the smallest sub-unit, equivalent to (for example) a "troop", "squad", or "section". The word führer simply meant "leader".

The term Scharführer can be traced to World War I, when it was referred to a NCO in charge of several shock troopers, or other special forces soldiers.

It was, however, used far more widely by Nazi Party paramilitary organizations, such as the Schutzstaffel, National Socialist Flyers' Corps, National Socialist Motor Corps, and the Sturmabteilung, between 1925 and 1945 and became strongly associated with them.

== Nazi usage ==
Scharführer is most recognizable as a rank of the SS and title of the SA. Scharführer was first used as a title in the Sturmabteilung (SA) as early as 1921 and became an actual rank in 1928. Scharführer was the first non-commissioned officer rank of the SA, and was denoted by a single pip centered on a collar patch. In 1930, veteran Scharführer were appointed to the new rank of SA-Oberscharführer, denoted by an additional silver stripe to the Scharführer collar patch.

The Schutzstaffel (SS) used the same insignia for Scharführer as the SA, but the level of rank changed in 1934 with a reorganization of the SS rank structure. At that time, the old rank of SS-Scharführer became known as SS-Unterscharführer with the title of SS-Scharführer becoming equivalent to an SA-Oberscharführer. The rank of SS-Truppführer was removed from the SS, to be replaced by SS-Oberscharführer and the new rank of SS-Hauptscharführer. The early Waffen-SS created an even higher rank, known as SS-Sturmscharführer.

Within the SA, Scharführer was senior to the rank of SA-Rottenführer while in the SS, a Scharführer was senior to that of SS-Unterscharführer. The rank of Scharführer was also used by other Nazi Party organizations; among them the National Socialist Flyers Corps (NSFK), National Socialist Motorist Corps (NSKK) and the Hitler Youth (HJ).

== Insignia ==
Shoulder strap (insignia)
SS-Scharführer
(SS-Oberjunker)

HJ Shoulder strap

NSFK Gorget patches

NSKK Gorget patch

SA Gorget patch

SS Gorget patches

SS smock insignia

Junior rank Unterscharführer	SS rank Scharführer	Senior rank Oberscharführer
Junior rank Rottenführer	SA rank Scharführer	Senior rank Oberscharführer

== See also ==
- Table of ranks and insignia of the Waffen-SS

== Bibliography ==
- Flaherty, T. H. (2004) [1988]. The Third Reich: The SS. Time-Life Books, Inc. ISBN 1-84447-073-3.
- McNab, Chris (2009). The SS: 1923–1945. Amber Books Ltd. ISBN 978-1-906626-49-5.
