= Oberscharführer =

Rank in the Schutzstaffel (SS)

- SS Gorget patch

- SS Shoulder and camo insignia
- Country: Nazi Germany
- Service branch: Schutzstaffel; Sturmabteilung; National Socialist Motor Corps; National Socialist Flyers Corps
- Abbreviation: Oscharf
- NATO rank code: OR-6
- Formation: 1932
- Abolished: 1945
- Next higher rank: Hauptscharführer (SS); Truppführer (SA)
- Next lower rank: Scharführer
- Equivalent ranks: Feldwebel

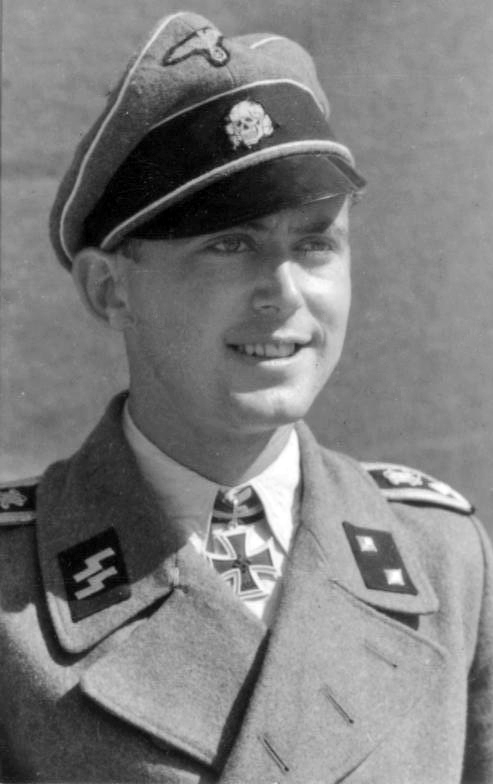
Oberscharführer of the Waffen-SS (Kurt Sametreiter)

Oberscharführer ([ˈoːbɐʃaːɐ̯fyːʁɐ], lit. 'Senior squad leader') was a Nazi Party paramilitary rank that existed between 1932 and 1945. Oberscharführer was first used as a rank of the Sturmabteilung (SA) and was created due to an expansion of the enlisted positions required by growing SA membership in the late 1920s and early 1930s. The SA rank of Oberscharführer was senior to Scharführer and junior to the rank of Truppführer.

Since early ranks of the Schutzstaffel (SS) were identical to the ranks of SA, Oberscharführer was created as an SS rank at the same time the position was created within the SA. Initially, the rank of SS-Oberscharführer was equal to its SA counterpart; however, this changed in 1934 following the Night of the Long Knives.

At that time, the SS rank system was reorganized and several new ranks established with older SA titles discontinued. The rank of SS-Oberscharführer was therefore "bumped up" and became equal to an SA-Truppführer. The insignia for the SS rank was changed, as well, becoming two silver collar pips in contrast to the SA insignia for Oberscharführer, which was a single collar pip with silver stripe.

Within the SA, an Oberscharführer was typically a squad leader, answering to a platoon non-commissioned officer. The responsibilities varied across a wider range in the SS, in particular between an Oberscharführer in the Allgemeine SS (general SS) and one holding the same position in the Waffen-SS (military wing of the SS). The rank of Oberscharführer was also used in other Nazi Party paramilitary organizations.

After 1938, when the SS adopted field grey uniforms as the standard duty attire, SS-Oberscharführer displayed the shoulder insignia of a Wehrmacht Feldwebel. The rank of SS-Oberscharführer was junior to SS-Hauptscharführer.

Various Waffen-SS units composed of foreign recruits were considered distinct from the German SS, and thus they were not permitted to wear SS runes on their collar tabs but had their unit symbol instead. Their ranks was also prepended with "Waffen" instead of "SS", as in, Waffen-Oberscharführer..

== Insignia ==
Shoulder strap (insignia)
SS-Oberscharführer
(SS-Standartenjunker)

NSFK Gorget patches

NSKK Gorget patch

SA Gorget patch

SS Gorget patches

HJ shoulder strap

SS smock insignia

Junior rank Scharführer	SS rank Oberscharführer	Senior rank Hauptscharführer
Junior rank Scharführer	SA rank Oberscharführer	Senior rank Truppführer

== See also ==
- Table of ranks and insignia of the Waffen-SS

== Bibliography ==
- Flaherty, T. H. (2004) [1988]. The Third Reich: The SS. Time-Life Books, Inc. ISBN 1-84447-073-3.
- McNab, Chris (2009). The SS: 1923–1945. Amber Books Ltd. ISBN 978-1-906626-49-5.
