= Heinrich Barbl =

Holocaust perpetrator

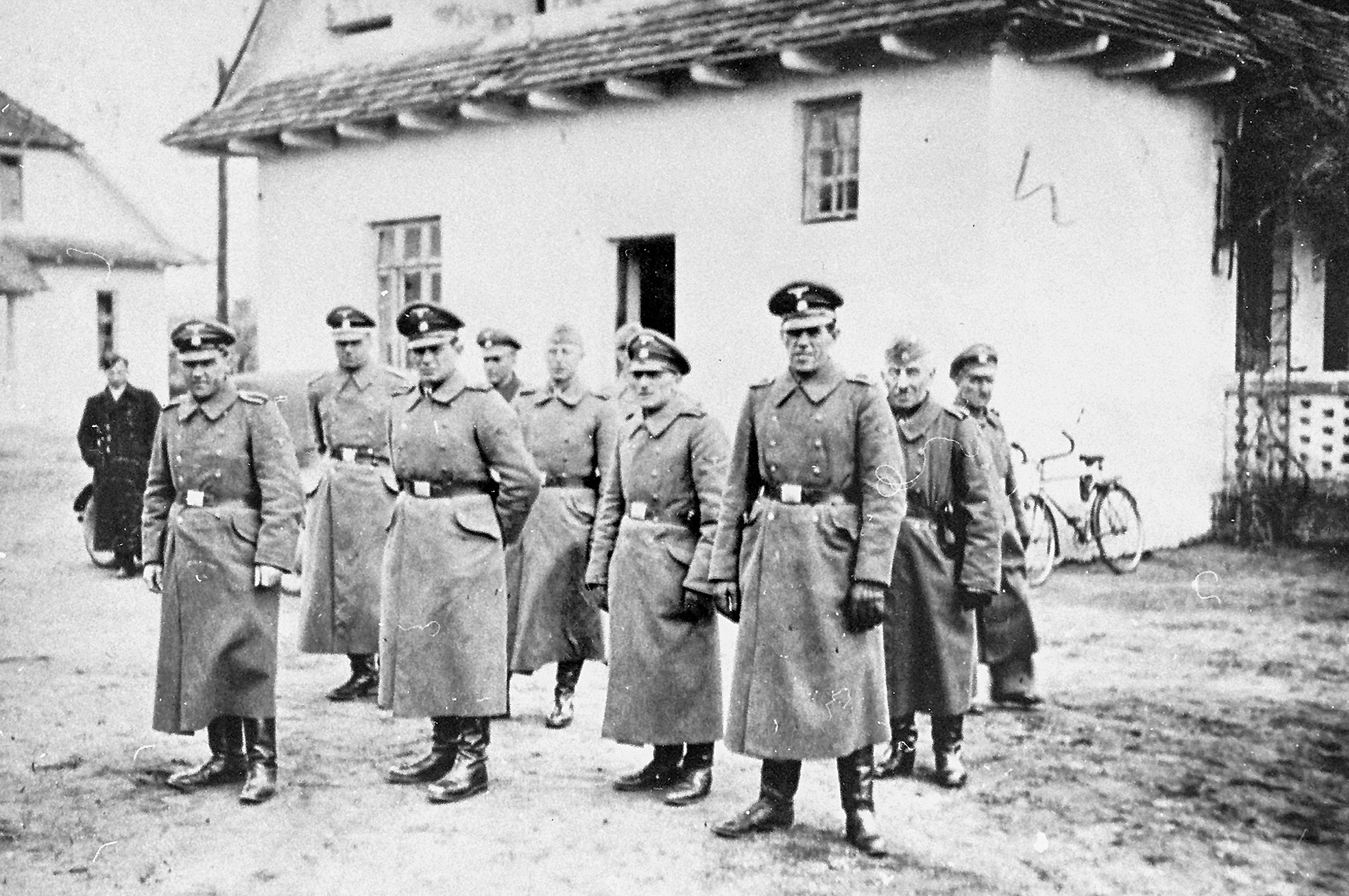
- Heinrich Barbl (back row, first from right), with SS staff of Bełżec extermination camp, 1942
- Born: 3 March 1900; Sarleinsbach, Austria
- Military career
- Allegiance: Nazi Germany
- Branch: Schutzstaffel
- Service years: 1930—1945
- Rank: SS-Rottenführer
- Unit: Bełżec extermination camp

Heinrich Barbl (born 3 March 1900, Sarleinsbach, Austria; date of death unknown, not before 1965) was an Austrian-born SS-Rottenführer. He participated in the T-4 euthanasia program in Nazi Germany and, after the invasion of Poland, in Operation Reinhard phase of the Holocaust.

== Life ==
Barbl was a tinsmith and plumber employed at the nitrogen works in Linz as a gas and waterpipe fitter. He joined the Nazi Party and the SS after the Anschluss of Austria. He was posted to Hartheim Euthanasia Centre at the onset of the Action T4 forced euthanasia program, and served at Grafeneck Euthanasia Centre as well. At both institutions he was a Stanzer, stamping sheet metal with names of the dead to form nameplates. He would then attach them to small urns which he used to fill up with ash; the urns were sent to victims' relatives correctly named, but invariably with the wrong contents, as he filled them up with ashes shoveled indiscriminately from the adjacent crematorium.

=== Operation Reinhard ===
In 1942 Barbl was posted to Bełżec extermination camp, the first of the Nazi German extermination camps created for the purpose of implementing the secretive Operation Reinhard. Barbl was often drunk on duty. Not particularly intelligent (which might also explain his low rank), he was frequently made fun of by his SS colleagues. Camp commandant, SS-Hauptsturmführer Gottlieb Hering did not allow him to participate in the execution of sick and elderly arrivals because, "he is so daft that he would shoot us, not the Jews". Consequently, he was the only person to be excused from this duty. However, no one was certain whether Barbl was genuinely stupid, or if he was merely acting a fool just to avoid more demanding tasks.

Barbl was not exempt from his commandant's punishments. He was frequently whipped by Christian Wirth for his drunken behavior, and for an unknown reason in the winter of 1942–43, Hering allegedly had him imprisoned in a cell for several days. Barbl was sent to Sobibor extermination camp by Wirth for his plumbing skills, to help fit the exhaust piping for the gas chambers. Barbl boasted that he had made the gas chambers look like neat shower rooms.

After the war Barbl was interrogated by Austrian police but was never put on trial. He submitted his testimony in Linz on 6 September 1965 at the Austrian Ministry of Internal Affairs. No further details are known of his life and death.
