= Rudolf Reder =

Holocaust survivor

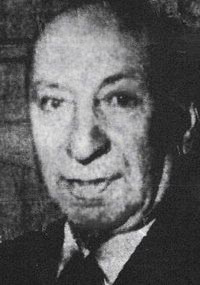
- A photo of Rudolf Reder in the collections of the Museum in Bełżec
- Born: April 4, 1881; Dębica, Austria-Hungary
- Died: October 6, 1977 (aged 96); Toronto, Canada
- Known for: 1946 book Belzec

Rudolf Reder a.k.a. Roman Robak (April 4, 1881 – October 6, 1977) was one of only two survivors of the Bełżec extermination camp. His testimony after the war became very well known. He submitted a deposition to the Main Commission for the Investigation of German Crimes in January 1946 in Kraków. In terms of the number of Polish Jews who perished in its gas chambers, Bełżec had the third highest death toll among the six Nazi death camps located in occupied Poland, estimated between 500,000 and 600,000 men, women and children. Only Auschwitz-Birkenau and Treblinka killed more people during the Holocaust.

The postwar testimony of Reder was of special significance. This is because Chaim Hirszman, the only other survivor of Bełżec, joined the new communist militia in Stalinist Poland shortly after the war and was himself murdered in March 1946 by anti-communist forces before he was able to give a full account of his camp experience.

== Life ==
Reder ran his own soap factory in Lemberg (then in the Austrian Partition, now Lviv in Ukraine) until 1910, according to the Bełżec Museum website. He married Feiga (née) Felsenfeld. The couple had three children, Freida (Zofia), Boruch (Bronisław), and Maria. Historian Dariusz Libionka wrote that Reder was in the United States until 1919. He returned to Lwów in already sovereign Poland and resumed (or perhaps, only began) soap production with the newly acquired knowledge. During the Holocaust, he lost his first wife and both children. Reder, age 61, was deported to Bełżec on August 11, 1942, with one of the first transports of Jews from the Lwów Ghetto after the new larger gas chambers were erected of brick and mortar. Because of his good knowledge of German, he was not sent off to die, but assigned to the Sonderkommando with a handful of others. At the ramp he claimed to have been a machinist, and for the next three months performed maintenance on the engine for the gas chambers among other tasks. At the end of November 1942, during the prisoner transport to Lviv for camp supplies and sheet metal, he escaped under cover of darkness. A Ukrainian woman, his former employee, helped him first, as did the Polish Righteous Joanna Borkowska whom Rudolf Reder married after the war and later emigrated with, settling in Toronto, Canada. He and his second wife, Joanna, are buried at Mount Pleasant Cemetery, in Toronto. It was previously believed that he had died in 1968, rather than 1977.

=== Reder's book ===
Soon after the Soviet takeover, whilst still in Poland, Reder testified in January 1946 in Kraków before the Central Commission for Investigation of German Crimes (known as the Institute of National Remembrance at present). In the same year, he published his testimony in a book, with the help of the Jewish Historical Committee in Kraków. His monograph titled Bełżec was written in Polish with the preface by his editor, Nella Rost, and illustrated with a map by Józef Bau, a Holocaust survivor who studied at the Jan Matejko Academy of Fine Arts. In the book, Reder wrote about what he saw as the motor-maintenance worker, and what he learned afterwards:

A dozen or so SS men drove the women along with whips and fixed bayonets all the way to the building and from there up three steps to a hall. There the askers counted 750 people for each gas chamber. (Note: The bricks-and-mortar building with the new gas chambers had six cubicles, each about 25 sq. m. It is impossible to squeeze such a large crowd [i.e. 750 people] into such a small space. According to Kurt Gerstein, the figure of 750 victims per gas chamber was provided by the camp's commandant Christian Wirth to a company of high-ranking SS officers who visited the camp in the middle of August 1942 including Gerstein himself. The above figure is identical to that stated in his own Gerstein Report. Therefore, Rudolf Reder must have been familiar with the Nuremberg records already at the time of his book publication — from "End Notes" by Robin O'Neil.) Those women who tried to resist were bayoneted until the blood was running. Eventually all the women were forced into the chambers. I heard the doors being shut; I heard shrieks and cries; I heard desperate calls for help in Polish and in Yiddish. I heard the blood-curdling wails of women and the squeals of children, which after a short time became one long, horrifying scream. This went on for fifteen minutes. The engine worked for twenty minutes. Afterwards there was total silence. Then the askers pushed open the doors that led outside. — Rudolf Reder, Bełżec

Reder changed his name to Roman Robak in 1949 and left Poland for Israel in 1950. He emigrated with his second wife to Canada in 1953. In 1960, he submitted a deposition at the prosecutor’s office in Munich as part of the German preparations for the Belzec trial against eight former SS members of Bełżec extermination camp personnel. Further information on Reder is scant. His second daughter married Leonard Shenker (Szenker) and settled in the United Kingdom. His account of the Belzec camp imprisonment, published in 1946, was reprinted in 1999 by Auschwitz-Birkenau State Museum with Fundacja Judaica in bilingual edition featuring an English translation by Margaret M. Rubel, then issued again as "Belzec" in Polin: Studies in Polish Jewry (volume 13, 2000), and republished in the UK as part of a book titled I Survived a Secret Nazi Extermination Camp by Mark Forstater in 2013.

== Bibliography ==
- Rudolf Reder & Wojewódzka Żydowska Komisja Historyczna w Krakowie (1946). Bełżec. Książki wojewódzkiej żydowskiej komisji historycznej w Krakowie, (vol) 4. Preface by Nella Rost: Wstęp. Kraków : Centralna Żydowska Komisja Historyczna (Jewish Historical Committee in Kraków. Provincial Branch of Centralna Żydowska Komisja Historyczna division of the Central Committee of Polish Jews). pp. 1–65. OCLC 186784721.
