= Balzheim =

- Municipality
- Coat of arms

- Location of Balzheim within Alb-Donau-Kreis district
- Interactive map of Balzheim
- Location within Germany Location within Baden-Württemberg
- Coordinates: 48°10′17″N 10°4′38″E
- Country: Germany
- State: Baden-Württemberg
- Admin. region: Tübingen
- District: Alb-Donau-Kreis

Government
  - Mayor (2020–28): Maximilian Hartleitner

Area
  - Total: 17.58 km^{2} (6.79 sq mi)
- Elevation: 529 m (1,736 ft)

Population (2025-12-31)
  - Total: 2,133
  - Density: 121.3/km^{2} (314.2/sq mi)
- Time zone: UTC+01:00 (CET)
  - Summer (DST): UTC+02:00 (CEST)
- Postal codes: 88481
- Dialling codes: 07347
- Vehicle registration: UL
- Website: www.balzheim.de

Balzheim (German pronunciation: [ˈbalt͡shaɪm]) is a municipality in the district of Alb-Donau in Baden-Württemberg in Germany.

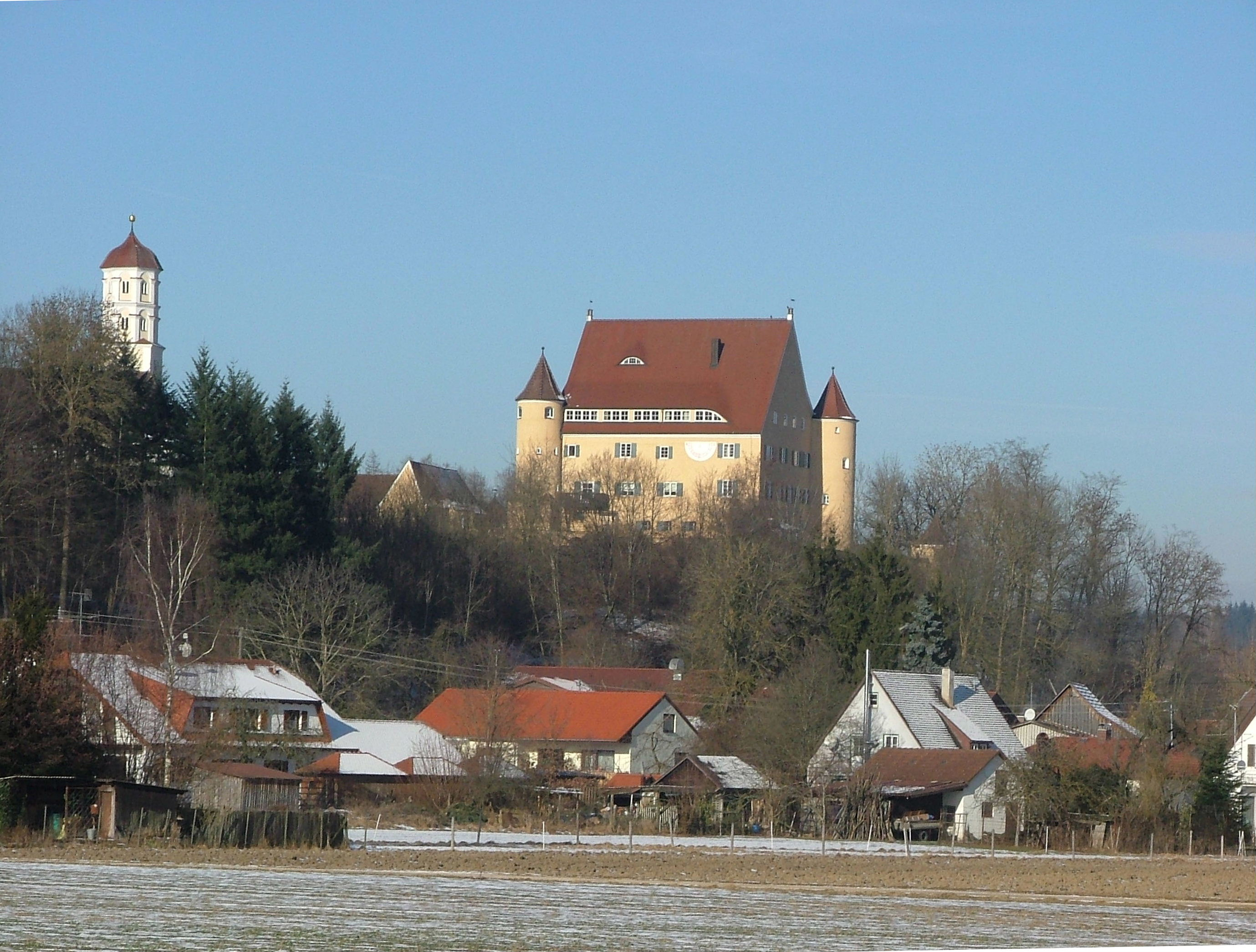
Balzheim castle

== Notable people ==
- Christian Wirth, called 'Christian the cruel', (1885–1944), German policeman, SS-Sturmbannführer, first commander of Belzec extermination camp, decisively involved in Aktion T4 .
