= Gottlieb Hering =

SS officer (1887–1945)

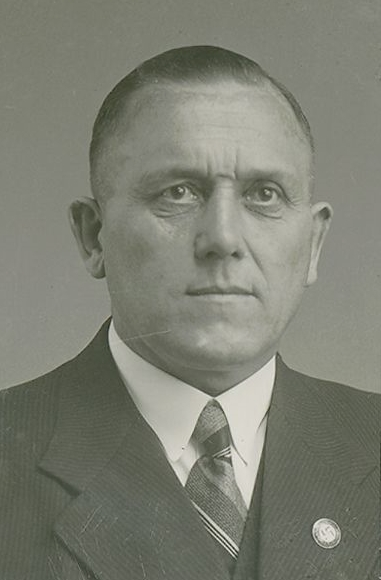
- Born: 2 June 1887; Warmbronn, German Empire
- Died: 9 October 1945 (aged 58); Stetten im Remstal, Allied-occupied Germany
- Military career
- Allegiance: Nazi Germany
- Branch: Schutzstaffel
- Rank: SS-Hauptsturmführer
- Unit: SS-Totenkopfverbände
- Commands: Bełżec, end of August 1942 — June 1943

Gottlieb Hering (2 June 1887 – 9 October 1945) was an SS commander of Nazi Germany. He served in Action T4 and later as the second and last commandant of Bełżec extermination camp during Operation Reinhard. Hering directly perpetrated the genocide of Jews and other peoples during The Holocaust.

== Early life ==
Hering was born and raised in Warmbronn, a district in the town of Leonberg. After finishing his schooling, Hering worked on a farm near his home. From 1907 to 1909, he served in the 20th (2nd Württemberg) Uhlans "King William I" regiment, and then voluntarily stayed on for another three years. Hering then joined the Heilbronn police in 1912. In 1914, Hering married and had one son.

During the First World War, Hering was called to serve in the machine gun company of Grenadier Regiment 123 in 1915, with which he fought on the Western Front in northern France until the armistice in 1918. He attained the rank of sergeant. For his war services he was awarded the Iron Cross First Class. After the First World War, Hering briefly rejoined the Schutzpolizei in Heilbronn.

== Police and SS career ==
Hering began his police career in 1919 as a detective (sergeant) in the criminal police (Kriminalpolizei, or Kripo) in Göppingen, near Stuttgart, making officer rank by 1929. In 1920, Hering had joined the Social Democratic Party of Germany. During the Weimar Republic era he initiated vigorous actions against the Nazi Party, SA and SS and consequently was called a "Nazi-eater". By the 1933 Nazi Seizure of Power ("Machtergreifung"), Nazi Party members vehemently demanded Hering's dismissal from the police. However, Hering had known Nazi Christian Wirth from official contexts since 1912, and while working in the Kripo in Stuttgart, the two became acquaintances, so that Hering was able to continue working despite the violent protests of local SA and SS men. In May 1933 Hering finally joined the Nazi Party. In 1934 he was appointed head of the Göppingen Kripo and then continued his career in 1939 in Stuttgart-Schwenningen. After the outbreak of World War II, Hering, along with other senior Kripo officers, was transferred to Gotenhafen (Gdynia) in December 1939. He was appointed with the task of resettling Volksdeutsche to the General Government.

=== Action T4 ===
Beginning in late 1940, Hering held various functions within the Action T4 "euthanasia" program. Having completed the order at Gdynia, he was transferred to work first at Sonnenstein Euthanasia Centre. Hering served as an assistant supervisor (as did Fritz Tauscher) to a police officer by the name of Schemel. After Sonnenstein, Hering became the office manager at Hartheim Euthanasia Centre. He also worked in the special registry offices of Bernburg and Hadamar euthanasia centres.

=== Operation Reinhard ===
After Action T4, Hering was posted briefly to the Sicherheitsdienst (SD) in Prague in June 1942, and was then transferred to Operation Reinhard in Lublin, Poland. He replaced Christian Wirth as commandant of Bełżec extermination camp at the end of August 1942. He served as the camp's commandant until its closure in June 1943.

After Himmler was impressed by his visit to the Reinhard camps in March 1943, Hering was promoted to the rank of SS-Hauptsturmführer (captain). SS-Scharführer Heinrich Unverhau, who served at Bełżec, testified about him: "Hering and Wirth were definitely wicked people, and the whole staff of the camp was afraid of them.... I heard that Hering shot two Ukrainian guards who expressed their dissatisfaction with what was going on in Bełżec."

Rudolf Reder, one of only two survivors of Bełżec, wrote of Hering's role in the killing of Jews.

He was a tall bully, broad shouldered, age around forty, with an expressionless face. He seemed to me as if he were a born bandit. Once, the gassing engine stopped working. When he was informed [about it], he arrived astride a horse, ordered the engine to be repaired and did not allow the people in the gas chambers to be removed. He let them strangle and die slowly for a few hours more. He yelled and shook with rage. In spite of the fact that he came only on rare occasions, the SS men feared him greatly. He lived alone, attended by Ukrainian orderly who served under him. This Ukrainian submitted to him the daily reports.

Tadeusz Misiewicz, a Pole who lived in the village of Bełżec and worked at the train station, testified about Hering (file No.: Ds. 1604/45 – Zamość. Dated 15 October 1945 / Belzec-OKBZ):

Once the major [sic], the commander of Bełżec death camp, invented a new type of entertainment: he tied a Jew with a rope to his car; the Jew was forced to run behind the car and behind them ran the major's dog and bit the Jew. The major rode from the camp to the water pump, which was in Bełżec on Tomaszowska Street, and back. What happened to this Jew I do not know. This event was witnessed by the people of Bełżec.

== Later career and death ==
After the termination of Operation Reinhard and the closure of Bełżec in June 1943, Hering remained the commander of the Poniatowa concentration camp reassigned as subcamp of Majdanek from the forced labor camp supporting the German war effort. On 3–4 November 1943, German police killed the remaining Jews at Poniatowa during Aktion Erntefest (German: Operation Harvest Festival). Hering then joined fellow SS men from the Operation Reinhard staff in Trieste, Italy. On 9 October 1945, Hering died of mysterious complications in the waiting room of St. Catherine's Hospital in Stetten im Remstal.

== Bibliography ==
- Ernst Klee: Das Personenlexikon zum Dritten Reich: Wer war was vor und nach 1945. Frankfurt on Main: Fischer-Taschenbuch-Verlag, 2005, ISBN 3-596-16048-0.
- Fritz Bauer Institut (Hrsg.): Arisierung im Nationalsozialismus – Jahrbuch 2000 zur Geschichte und Wirkung des Holocaust. Frankfurt on Main: Campus, 2000, ISBN 3-593-36494-8.
- Wedekind, Michael: Nationalsozialistische Besatzungs- und Annexionspolitik in Norditalien 1943 bis 1945: Die Operationszonen „Alpenvorland“ und „Adriatisches Küstenland“ (= Militärgeschichtliche Studien 38). Edited by Militärgeschichtliches Forschungsamt, Munich: R. Oldenbourg, 2003, ISBN 3-486-56650-4.
- Israel Gutman (ed.): Enzyklopädie des Holocaust: Die Verfolgung und Ermordung der europäischen Juden, München / Zürich: Piper, 1998, ISBN 3-492-22700-7.

Military offices
Preceded by SS-Sturmbannführer Christian Wirth	Commandant of Bełżec extermination camp end of August 1942 — June 1943	Succeeded by None
