= Lorenz Hackenholt =

German SS officer (1914 – missing 1945)

- Lorenz Hackenholt when Aktion T4 was carried out, c. 1940
- Born: Laurenzius Marie Hackenholt; 26 June 1914; Gelsenkirchen, German Empire
- Died: Declared legally dead 31 December 1945 (aged 31)
- Military career
- Allegiance: Nazi Germany
- Branch: Schutzstaffel
- Service years: 1933–1945
- Rank: Hauptscharführer
- Unit: Totenkopfverbände
- Commands: Constructed and operated gas chamber at Bełżec extermination camp

Laurenzius Marie "Lorenz" Hackenholt (26 June 1914 – missing 1945, declared legally dead as of 31 December 1945, but believed to have still been alive) was a member of the Schutzstaffel (SS) with the rank of Hauptscharführer (First Sergeant). During World War II Hackenholt built and operated the gas chamber at the Bełżec extermination camp in occupied Poland during Operation Reinhard. In doing so, he personally carried out and managed the murder of hundreds of thousands of people, both directly and indirectly.

Hackenholt had earlier been part of the murder of mental patients and disabled people in Action T4 programme of forced euthanasia.

== Life ==
Hackenholt's full name was Laurenzius Marie Hackenholt. He was born on 26 June 1914 in Gelsenkirchen/Ruhr. His father was Theodor Hackenholt and his mother was Elizabeth Wobriezek. He attended the local elementary school until he reached the age of 14. He then became an apprentice bricklayer. After he passed the trade examination, he worked on various building sites.

=== Concentration camp guard ===
In 1933, Hackenholt volunteered for the SS. After joining the SS he was sent to a training school on 1 January 1934. After that he volunteered for service in the army, where he was assigned to the 12th Engineers' Battalion. After two years of military service, he was discharged, and then joined the SS Death's Head troops. He was a skilled driver and mechanic and, beginning in March 1938, served at Sachsenhausen concentration camp in the motor pool. He also worked as a guard at Sachsenhausen.

=== Action T4 ===

Aktion T4, the so-called "Euthanasia Program", lasted from early 1940 until the summer of 1941 when the gassings were stopped on Hitler's orders. In November 1939 Hackenholt was assigned to Action T4, when he was transferred to Berlin for 'special duty'. This special duty was under Viktor Brack. According to Werner Karl Dubois, another camp guard transferred to special duty with Hackenholt:

Photographs of extreme cases of mental illness were shown to us. We were told that ... the institutions from which the mentally ill were to be taken were needed as military hospitals. We were further told that gas chambers were to be built in which the victims would be gassed, after which they would be cremated. We, anyway, would have nothing to do with the killings, we would only have to cremate the corpses.

There were six T4 killing facilities. Hackenholt served in all of them. He drove a bus with the SS staff from facility to facility. He also removed the bodies from the gas chambers and burned them. For a while Hackenholt was a driver for SS-Untersturmführer Dr. August Becker, the T4 chemist who was responsible for delivering bottled carbon monoxide gas from IG Farben manufacturing plants to the T4 gas chambers. Hackenholt worked primarily in Grafeneck and Sonnenstein.

=== Operation Reinhard and beyond ===
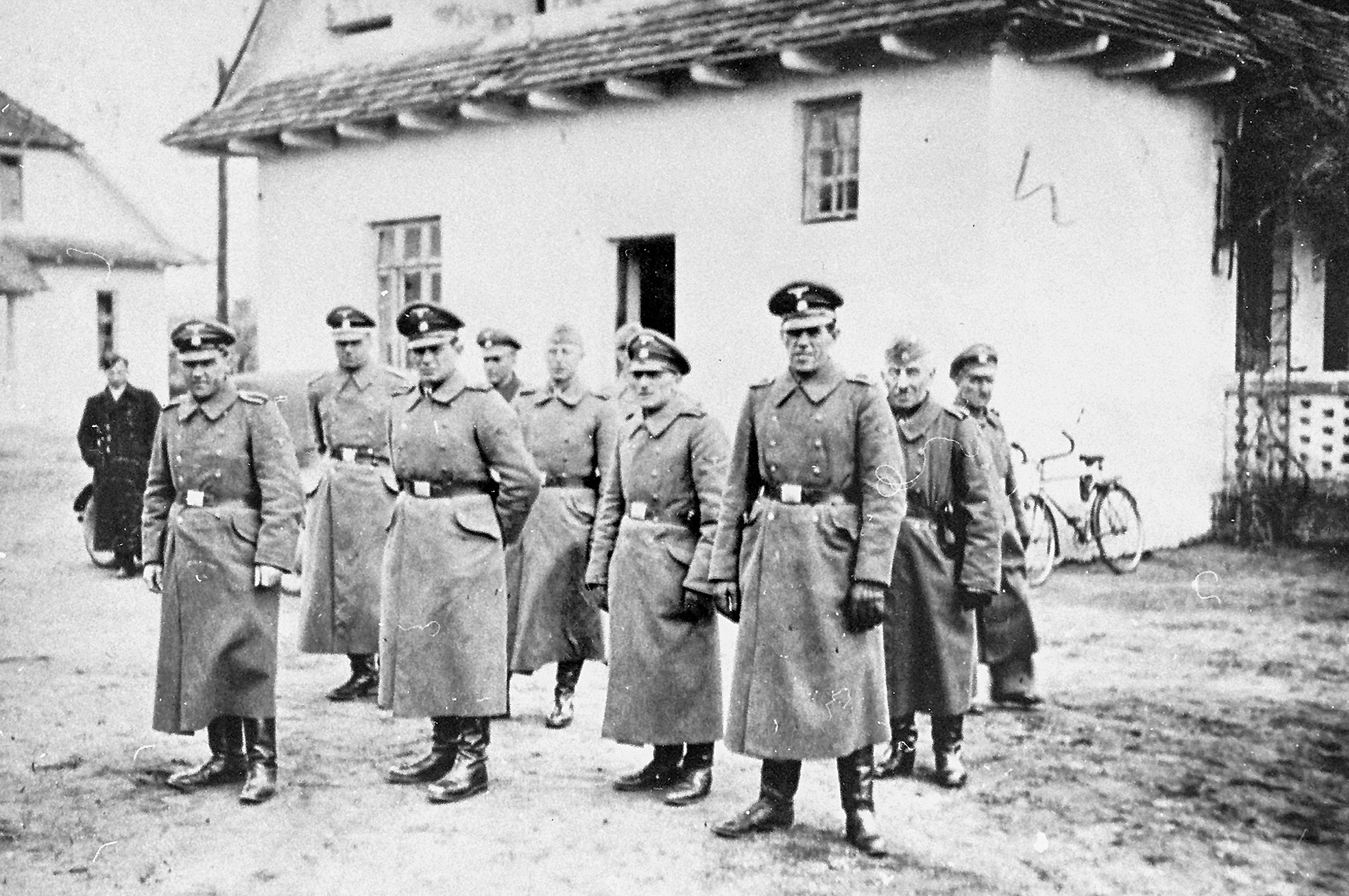
SS staff at KZ Belzec. Hackenholt is third from the right (front row).

In the fall of 1941, some of the Action T4 personnel, including Hackenholt, were transferred to Lublin Reservation in occupied Poland where they came under the authority of SS-Brigadeführer Odilo Globocnik. On vacation leave, Hackenholt went to Berlin to marry Ilse Zillmer, who was then 29 years old. Hackenholt returned to Poland and was sent to Bełżec, a remote labour camp near the rail station, to conduct experiments to establish a method for the mass-murder of Jews by gassing. Hackenholt set up three gas chambers in an insulated barracks. Using engine exhaust, piped into the chambers from a disassembled Soviet tank, Hackenholt murdered over 50,000 Jews in one month (mid March to mid April 1942). This month alone placed his direct kill count as possibly the highest recorded in history. In August 1942, Hackenholt built and operated newer and larger gas chambers at Belzec. Once Belzec came into operation, a sign was placed over the gas chambers which said "Hackenholt Foundation"; with potted geraniums on either side of the entrance. Hackenholt also designed and operated gas chambers at the Treblinka and Sobibor extermination camps.

Hackenholt, who was called "Hacko" by other guards, was a tough, large man who was willing and able to do any task at the extermination camps, although he reportedly balked at cleaning up seeping corruption from bodies rotting in mass graves. At Belzec, where all ages of people were murdered, some Jews, because of infirmity or age, could not enter the gas chamber. These people were instead laid down in the mass graves, and, according to the testimony of other guards, shot by Hackenholt. In 1943, when Himmler ordered the mass graves at Belzec to be reopened and the bodies burned, Hackenholt was in charge of the operation. Himmler considered Hackenholt to be "one of the most deserving men of Operation Reinhard" (German: einer der verdientesten Männer der Aktion Reinhard).

In December 1943, Hackenholt and other personnel from Operation Reinhard were transferred to northern Italy (Trieste), where they attempted to find and murder the few remaining Italian Jews. In 1944 Hackenholt was awarded the Iron Cross (Second Class) for his role in Operation Reinhard. In April 1945, he was arrested on charges of selling weapons to partisans, a misdemeanor punishable by death. Chris Webb, however, reports that Hackenholt avoided being shot and was released from custody by the decision of the commander of the Einsatz R, Dietrich Allers. He was then to work in Trieste as a driver for some time. His colleagues from Einsatz R were to meet him for the last time in Austria, during the retreat of their unit. On the road to Kirbach, their motorcade was supposed to pass a horse-drawn dairy cart driven by Hackenholt in May 1945.

In the summer of 1945, Rudolf Kamm, an essayist from the Bełżec crew, was to report to Hackenholt's wife Ilse (née Zillmer, b. 1912), who was in Berlin at the time. He claimed that Hackenholt sent him to his wife to give him civilian clothes through him.

== 1945 disappearance and investigation ==
What is certain is that he disappeared and, based on an application by his wife, was declared dead by a Berlin court on 1 April 1954, with an official date of death of 31 December 1945. At the end of July 1959, the Headquarters for the Investigation of National Socialist Crimes in Ludwigsburg in West Germany opened an investigation into the crimes committed in Bełżec. They were able to locate Hackenholt's wife and mother. Both certified that Hackenholt had not been heard from since the war, and surveillance of the wife's residence showed there were no attempts by him to visit her there.

== Post-1946 ==
Hackenholt's brother, Theo, testified that in 1946 he saw him on the road from Dortmund to Gelsenkirchen driving a vehicle. In 1961, West German Police interrogated Hackenholt's former colleague Hermann Erich Bauer, then serving a life sentence in Berlin. Bauer stated that Hackenholt had definitely survived the war, because he had met him in 1946 near Ingolstadt, Bavaria, where he allegedly worked as a driver or courier. Bauer stated that Hackenholt had assumed the identity of a dead Wehrmacht soldier named Jansen, Jensen or Johannsen and lived with a woman he had met in Trieste. The West German police conducted an investigation but were not able to locate Hackenholt, or to determine whether he might still be alive. They searched the homes of his wife and mother and interrogated his former friends who had served with him in Poland. Archives and records of offences were examined, as well as numerous inquiries to potential witnesses to determine whether a driver named Jansen or similar was working in the Ingolstadt area. Up to 90,000 people were tested. Licence applications submitted near Ingolstadt between 1945 and 1947 had their contents compared with photos of Hackenholt and samples of his writing. However, several years of police searching did not produce any official results. British researcher and historian Michael Tregenza spent many years exploring Hackenholt's postwar whereabouts and was repeatedly warned against looking for him. Tregenza believed that Hackenholt had survived the war and was living under a false name somewhere in Germany.

== See also ==
- List of fugitives from justice who disappeared
