= Robin O'Neil =

Holocaust researcher and writer

- Occupations: Historian, author
- Writing career
- Notable works: The Rabka Four (2011); Belzec: Stepping Stone to Genocide (2009)

Robin O'Neil is a Holocaust researcher and author. After a career as the British major crimes' investigator who worked on criminal investigations for the Metropolitan Police Service and other police services in the Home Counties, he obtained his Masters and Doctorate with the Hebrew and Jewish Department at University College London. He now specialises in researching Nazi war crimes and the destruction of the European Jewish communities (1933–1945).

== Biography ==
Robin O'Neil has pursued his work to the Baltic States and former USSR. He has launched a number of investigations into the perpetrators of the Holocaust, particularly those active in Lithuania and occupied Poland during World War II. He has conducted research regarding the Schutzstaffel (SS) and extermination camp commandants of Belzec, Sobibor, and Treblinka.

O'Neil has performed extensive source research into the Oskar Schindler story. A historical consultant to several TV documentaries and radio broadcasts in the UK and abroad, he is an honoured guest of Schindler's home town, Svitavy, Czech Republic, and is a regular lecturer at universities in the United Kingdom, United States, Israel, and Eastern Europe. In his spare time he conducts research into the House of Habsburg and Shakespeare's England. In 2013, after prolonged research, O'Neil completed his work on a new book about the Gustav Mahler family under the Third Reich.

== The Rabka Four ==
O'Neil's work The Rabka Four - Instruments of Genocide and Grand Larceny. A Warning from History was first published completely online in 2011 by the Yizkor Book Project. It was made available by O'Neil to JewishGen for the purpose of fulfilling their mission of disseminating knowledge about the Holocaust. The monograph is devoted to the history of the German SS training facility Sipo-SD Academy in Rabka in occupied Poland where, "under the cloak of war – personal vendetta, corruption, robbery and murder [became] endemic among the SS" functionaries. O'Neil reveals how the euphemistic language spoken within the Nazi State allowed for the sanitization of genocide and the creation of the complete illusion of 'plain speak' in phrases such as 'treatment', 'processing', and 'resettlement' which enabled the SS to turn mass murder into a "bureaucratic paper chase".

== Publications ==
- 1998: East European Jewish Affairs Vol. 28, 49: "Belzec: The 'Forgotten' Death Camp"
- 1999: East European Jewish Affairs Vol. 29, 85: A Reassessment of the Number of Victims Belzec
- 2008: Oskar Schindler: Stepping Stone To Life. Jewish Heritage Committee, New York
- 2009: Belzec: Stepping Stone to Genocide. Museum of Jewish Heritage, New York
- 2010: The Rabka Four - Instruments of Genocide and Grand Larceny. Spiderwize, London
- 2013: The Mahler Family Legacy Under the Third Reich

=== E-book publications ===
- Belzec: The Destruction Of The Jews In The District Of Galicia
- Galicia, Poland
- Schindler: Stepping Stone To Life
- Kaunas, Lithuania: The Kovno Ghetto Diary (Kaunas Ghetto)
- Poland And Her Jews 1941–1944.
- Belzec: Prototype For The Final Solution.
- Sipo-SD Rabka Police School, occupied Poland.

== Other work ==
- Educational establishments and Synagogues, UK. Other Aspects 2000
- Belzec Archaeology lecture: University of Leicester 2006
- The Elchanan and Miriam Elkes Memorial Lecture "Stepping Stones to Genocide: Aktion Reinhardt and the Holocaust"
- Holocaust Education: Co-founder, Historical Consultant and contributor to www.holocaustresearchproject.org
- Consultant and participant on documentary film and television projects in Israel, Germany, the United States, and the United Kingdom
- 1998–2000: Archaeology. Seconded to the Nicolaus Copernicus University in Toruń (Poland) archaeological survey on the site of Belzec Death Camp
