= Sarleinsbach =

- Municipality
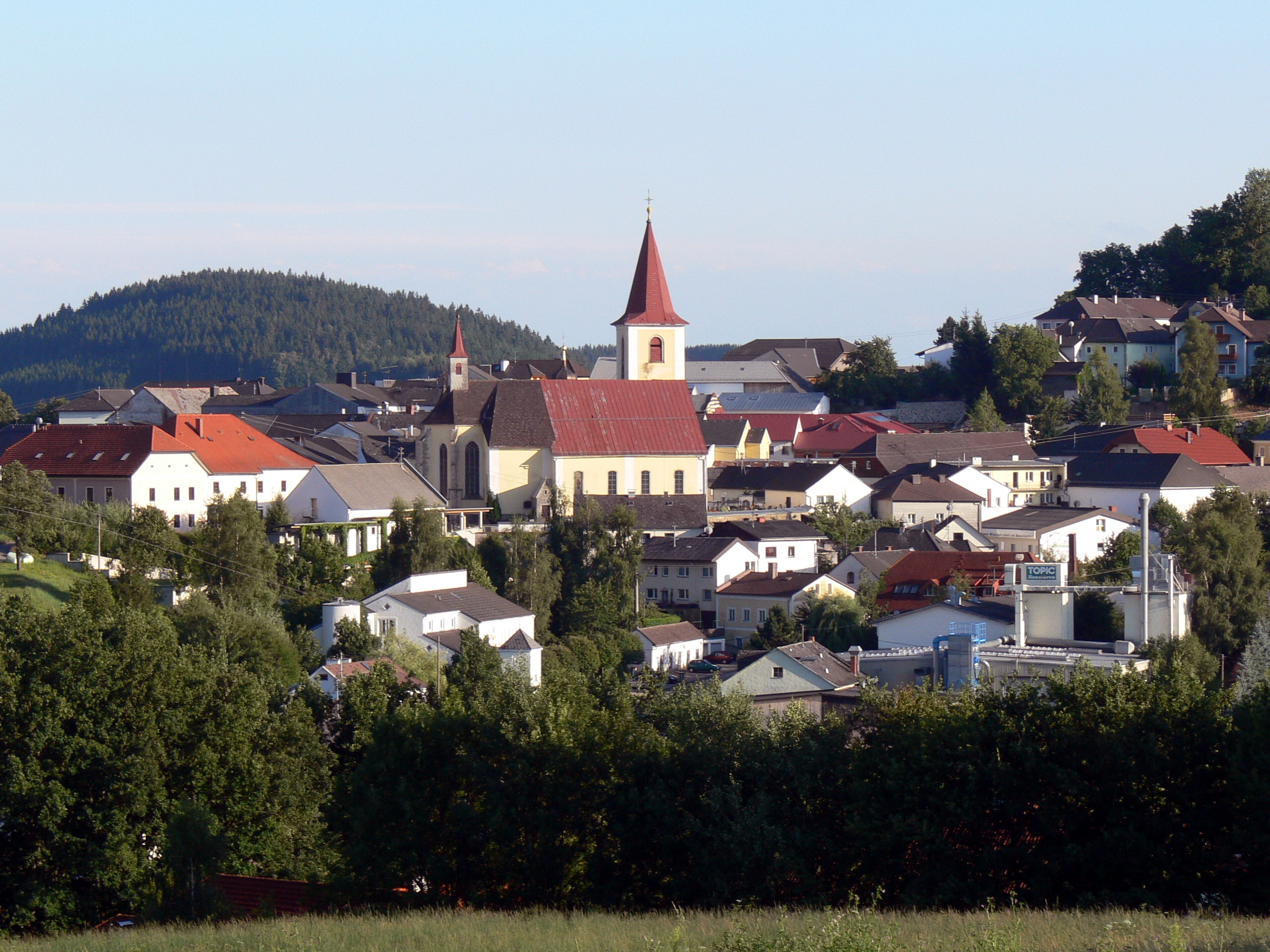

- Coat of arms

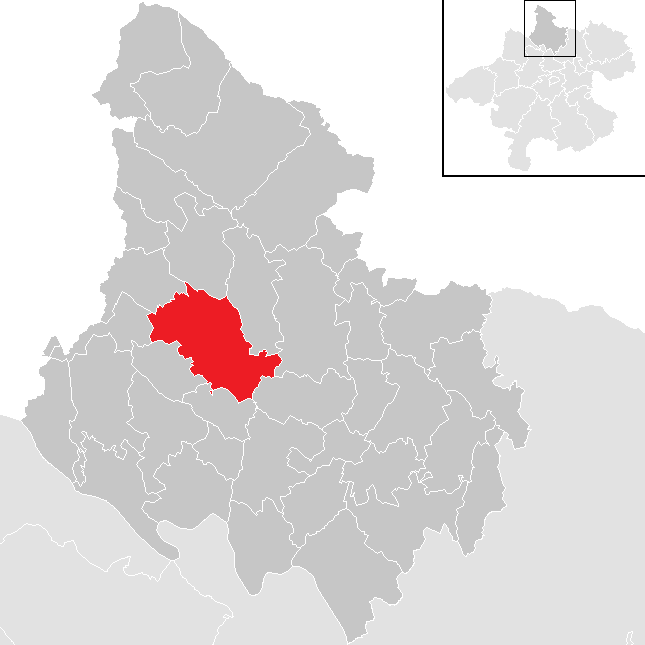
- Location in the district

- Location within Austria
- Coordinates: 48°32′50″N 13°54′19″E
- Country: Austria
- State: Upper Austria
- District: Rohrbach

Government
  - Mayor: Roland Bramel (ÖVP)

Area
  - Total: 36.84 km^{2} (14.22 sq mi)
- Elevation: 561 m (1,841 ft)

Population (2018-01-01)
  - Total: 2,284
  - Density: 62.00/km^{2} (160.6/sq mi)
- Time zone: UTC+1 (CET)
  - Summer (DST): UTC+2 (CEST)
- Postal code: 4152
- Area code: 07283
- Vehicle registration: RO
- Website: www.sarleinsbach.at

Sarleinsbach is a municipality in the district of Rohrbach in the Austrian state of Upper Austria.

== Geography ==
Sarleinsbach lies in the upper Mühlviertel. About 35 percent of the municipality is forest, and 58 percent is farmland.
