= Belzec extermination camp =

Nazi extermination camp in Poland (1942–1943)

Belzec
- Nazi extermination camp
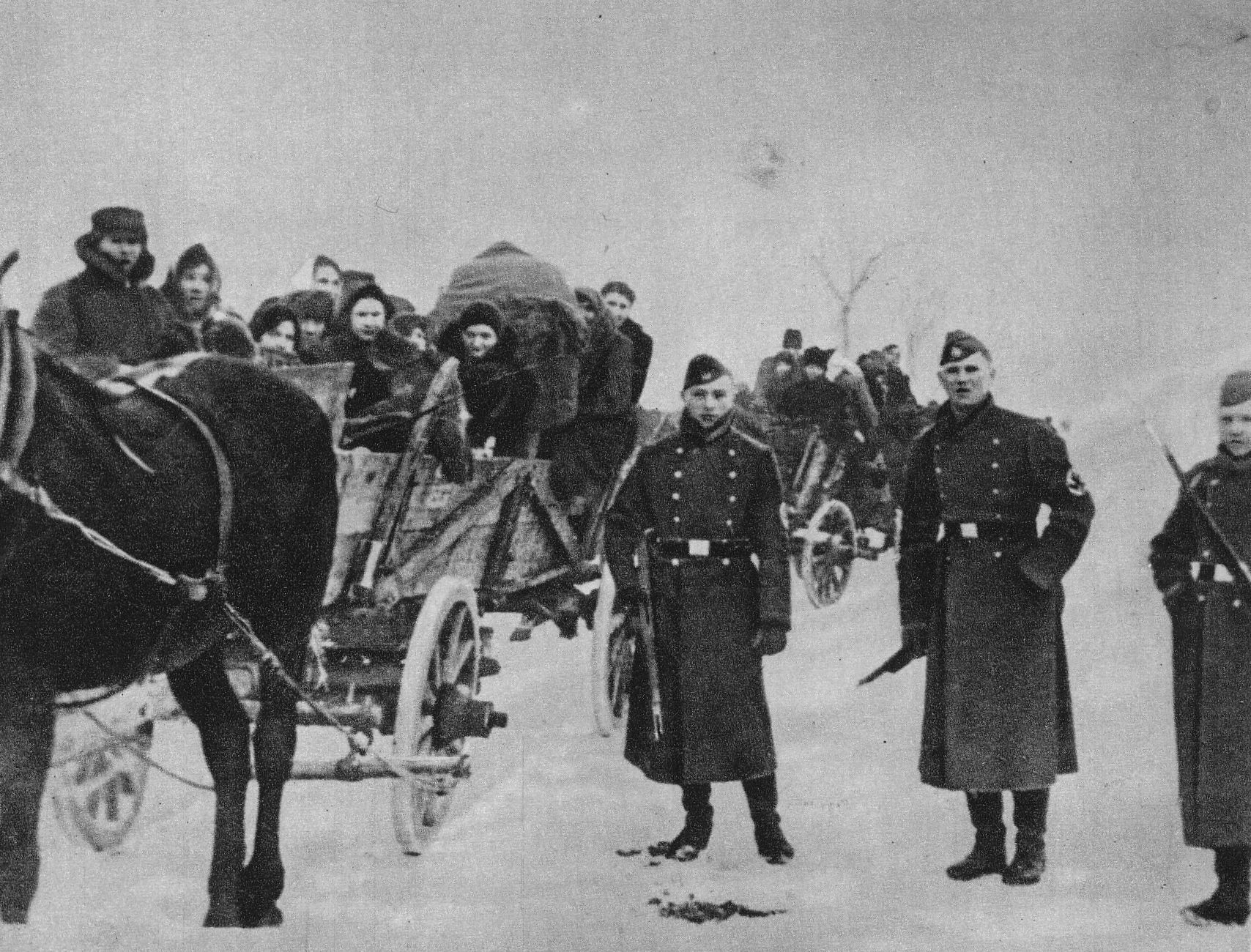
- Jews from Lublin District during deportation to Belzec Location of Bełżec (lower centre) on the map of German extermination camps marked with black and white skulls. Borders of the Second Polish Republic before World War II
- Coordinates: 50°22′18″N 23°27′27″E
- Known for: Annihilation of Europe's Jews in the Holocaust
- Location: Near Bełżec, General Government (German-occupied Poland)
- Built by: Richard Thomalla (layout); Lorenz Hackenholt (gas chambers)
- Operated by: SS-Totenkopfverbände
- Commandant: Christian Wirth (Dec. 1941 – Aug. 1942); Gottlieb Hering (Aug. 1942 – June 1943)
- First built: 1 November 1941 – March 1942
- Operational: 17 March 1942 – end of June 1943
- Number of gas chambers: 3 (later 6)
- Inmates: Polish, German, Czech, Ukrainian and Austrian Jews
- Killed: 434,508–600,000
- Notable inmates: Rudolf Reder

Belzec (English: /ˈbɛl.zɛk/ or /ˈbɛl.ʒɛts/, Polish: [ˈbɛu̯ʐɛt͡s]; German: [ˈbɛlzɛts]) was a Nazi German extermination camp in occupied Poland. It was built by the SS for the purpose of implementing the secretive Operation Reinhard, the plan to murder all Polish Jews, a major part of the "Final Solution", the overall Nazi effort to complete the genocide of all European Jews. Before Germany's defeat put an end to this project, approximately six million Jews had been murdered in the Holocaust. The camp operated from 17 March 1942 to the end of June 1943. It was situated about 500 m (1,600 ft) south of the local railroad station of Bełżec, in the new Lublin District of the General Government territory of German-occupied Poland. The burning of exhumed corpses on five open-air grids and bone crushing continued until March 1943.

Between 430,000 and 500,000 Jews are believed to have been murdered by the SS at Bełżec. It was the third-deadliest extermination camp, exceeded only by Treblinka and Auschwitz. Only seven Jews performing slave labour with the camp's Sonderkommando survived World War II. Only Rudolf Reder's experience there became known, thanks to his official postwar testimony. The lack of viable witnesses able to testify about the camp's operation is the primary reason why Bełżec is little known, despite the victim number count. Israeli historian David Silberklang writes that Belzec "was perhaps the place most representative of the totality and finality of the Nazi plans for Jews".

== Background ==
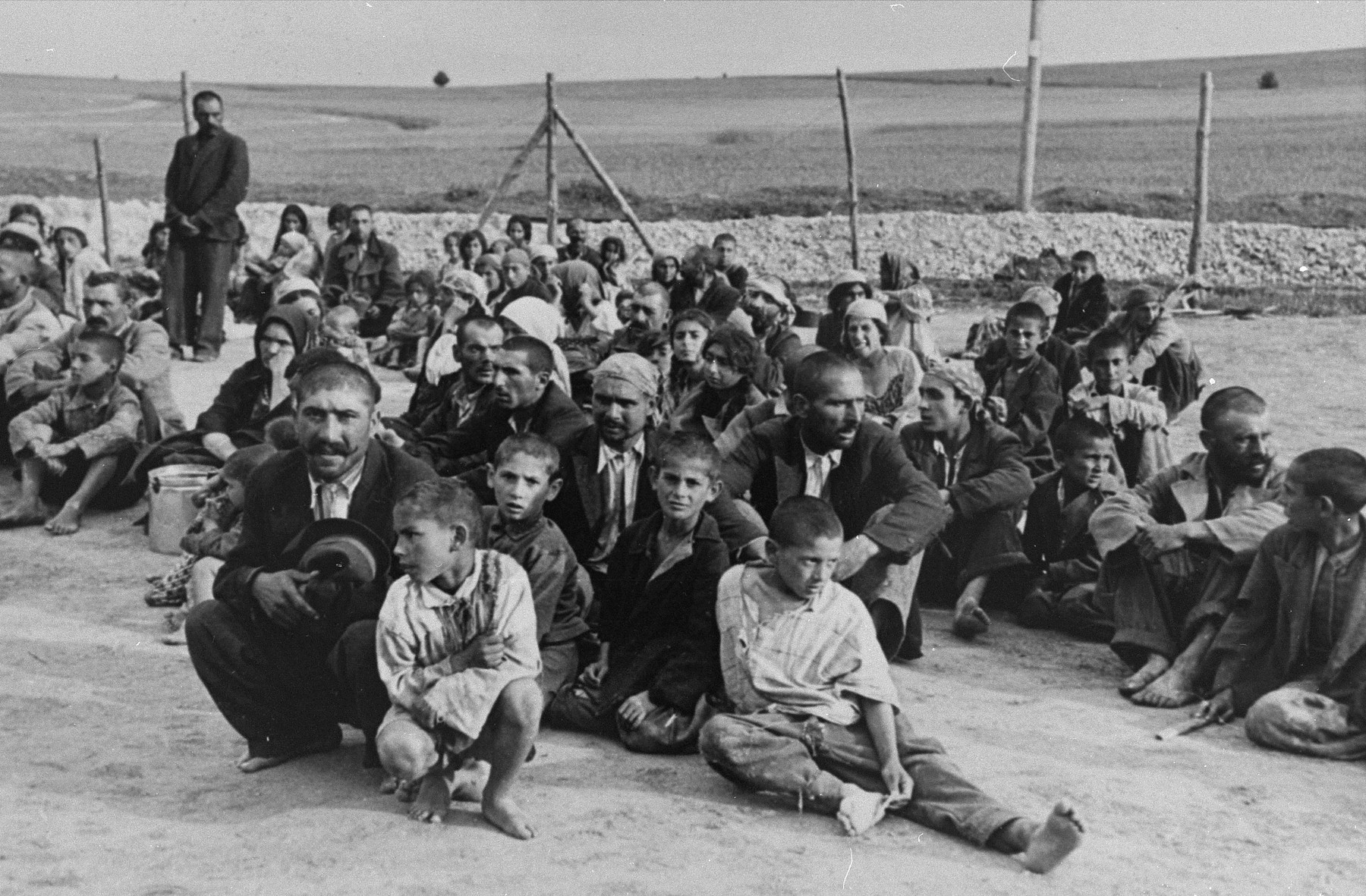
Romani prisoners in Belzec concentration camp, 1940, before it was converted into an extermination camp

In the Second Polish Republic, the village of Bełżec was situated between the two major cities in the southeastern part of the country including Lublin 76 kilometres (47 mi) northwest of Bełżec, and Lwów to the southeast (German: Lemberg, now Lviv, Ukraine) with the largest Jewish populations in the region. Bełżec fell within the German zone of occupation in accordance with the German-Soviet Pact against Poland. Originally, Jewish forced labour was brought into the area in April 1940 for the construction of military defence facilities of the German strategic plan codenamed Operation Otto against the Soviet advance beyond their common frontier following the Soviet invasion of 1939.

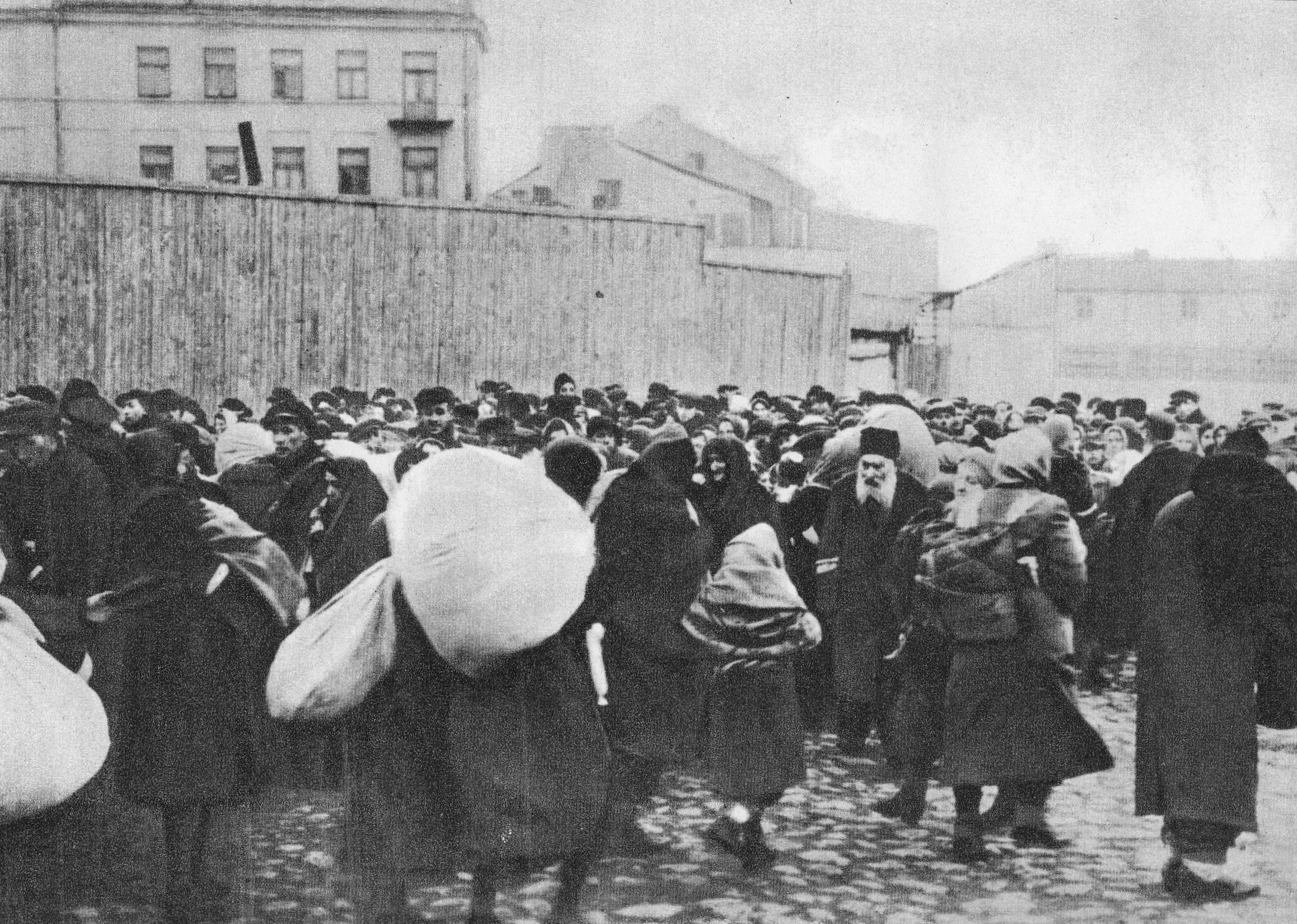
Deportation of Jews to Bełżec from Zamość, April 1942

In the territory of the so-called Nisko "reservation", the city of Lublin became the hub of the early Nazi transfer of about 95,000 German, Austrian, and Polish Jews expelled from the West and the General Government area. The prisoners were put to work by the Schutzstaffel (SS) in the construction of anti-tank ditches (Burggraben) along the transitory Nazi-Soviet border. The Burggraben project was abandoned with the onset of Operation Barbarossa. On 13 October 1941, Heinrich Himmler gave the SS-and-Police Leader of Lublin, SS Brigadeführer Odilo Globočnik an order to start Germanizing the area around Zamość, which entailed the removal of Jews from the areas of future settlement.

=== Camp construction ===
The decision to begin work on the first stationary gas chambers in the General Government preceded the actual Wannsee Conference by three months. The first steps were taken between mid-September and mid-October 1941, and the construction began around 1 November. The site near Bełżec was chosen for several reasons: it was situated on the border between the Lublin District and the German District of Galicia formed after Operation Barbarossa. It could "process" the Jews of both regions. The ease of transportation was secured by the railroad junction at nearby Rawa-Ruska and the highway between Lublin-Stadt and Lemberg. The northern boundary of the planned killing centre consisted of an anti-tank trench constructed a year earlier. The ditch, excavated originally for military purposes was likely to serve as the first mass grave. Globocnik brought in Obersturmführer Richard Thomalla who was a civil engineer by profession and the camp construction expert in the SS. Work had commenced in early November 1941, using local builders overseen by a squad of Trawniki guards. The installation, resembling a railway transit point for the purpose of forced labour, was finished before Christmas. It featured insulated barracks for showering among several other structures. Some local men were released. The SS completed the work in February 1942 by fitting in the tank engine and the exhaust piping systems for gassing. The trial killings were performed in early March.

The "Final Solution" was formulated at the Wannsee Conference in late January 1942 by the leading proponents of gassing (who were unaware of Bełżec's existence), including Wilhelm Dolpheid, Ludwig Losacker, Helmut Tanzmann and Governor Otto Wächter. Dolpheid negotiated with the SS-Oberführer Viktor Brack in Berlin for the use of the Aktion T4 personnel in the process. Only two months later, on 17 March 1942, the daily gassing operations at Bełżec extermination camp began with the T4 leadership brought in from Germany under the guise of Organisation Todt (OT).

=== Experience in the Aktion T4 euthanasia program ===
The three commandants of the camp including Kriminalpolizei officers SS-Sturmbannführer Christian Wirth and SS-Hauptsturmführer Gottlieb Hering, had been involved in the forced euthanasia program since 1940 in common with almost all of their German staff thereafter. Wirth had the leading position as the supervisor of six extermination hospitals in the Reich; Hering was the non-medical chief of the Sonnenstein gassing facility in Saxony as well as at the Hadamar killing centre. Christian Wirth had been a killing expert from the beginning as participant of the first T-4 gassing of handicapped people at the Brandenburg killing centre. He was, therefore, an obvious choice to be the first commandant of the first stationary extermination camp of Operation Reinhard in the General Government. It was his proposal to use the exhaust gas emitted by the internal-combustion engine of a motorcar as the killing agent instead of the bottled carbon monoxide, because no delivery from outside the camp would be required as in the case of the T-4 method. However, Wirth decided that the comparable technology of mobile gas vans used at Chełmno extermination camp before December 1941 (and by the Einsatzgruppen in the East), had proven insufficient for the projected number of victims from the Holocaust trains arriving at the new railway approach ramp.

Wirth developed his method on the basis of experience he had gained in the fixed gas chambers of Aktion T4. Even though Zyklon B became broadly available later on, Wirth decided against it. Zyklon B was produced by a private firm for both Birkenau, and Majdanek nearby, but their infrastructure differed. Bełżec was an Operation Reinhard camp meant to circumvent the problems of supply, and instead, rely on a system of extermination based on ordinary and readily available killing agents. For economic and practical reasons, Wirth had almost the same carbon monoxide gas used in T-4, generated with the torque of a large engine. Although Holocaust witnesses' testimonies differ as to the type of fuel, Erich Fuchs' postwar affidavit indicates that most probably it was a petrol engine with a system of pipes delivering exhaust fumes into the gas chambers. For very small transports of Jews and Gypsies over a short distance, a minimised version of the gas van technology was also used in Bełżec. The T-4 participant and first operator of the gas chambers, SS-Hauptscharführer Lorenz Hackenholt, rebuilt an Opel Blitz post-office vehicle with the help of a local craftsman into a small gas van. The killing process, using the lethal carbon monoxide, often failed to be completed quickly, inflicting horrific suffering on the victims as they suffocated to death. The guards jokingly referred to the killing site as the Hackenholt Foundation.

=== Concealment of camp's purpose ===
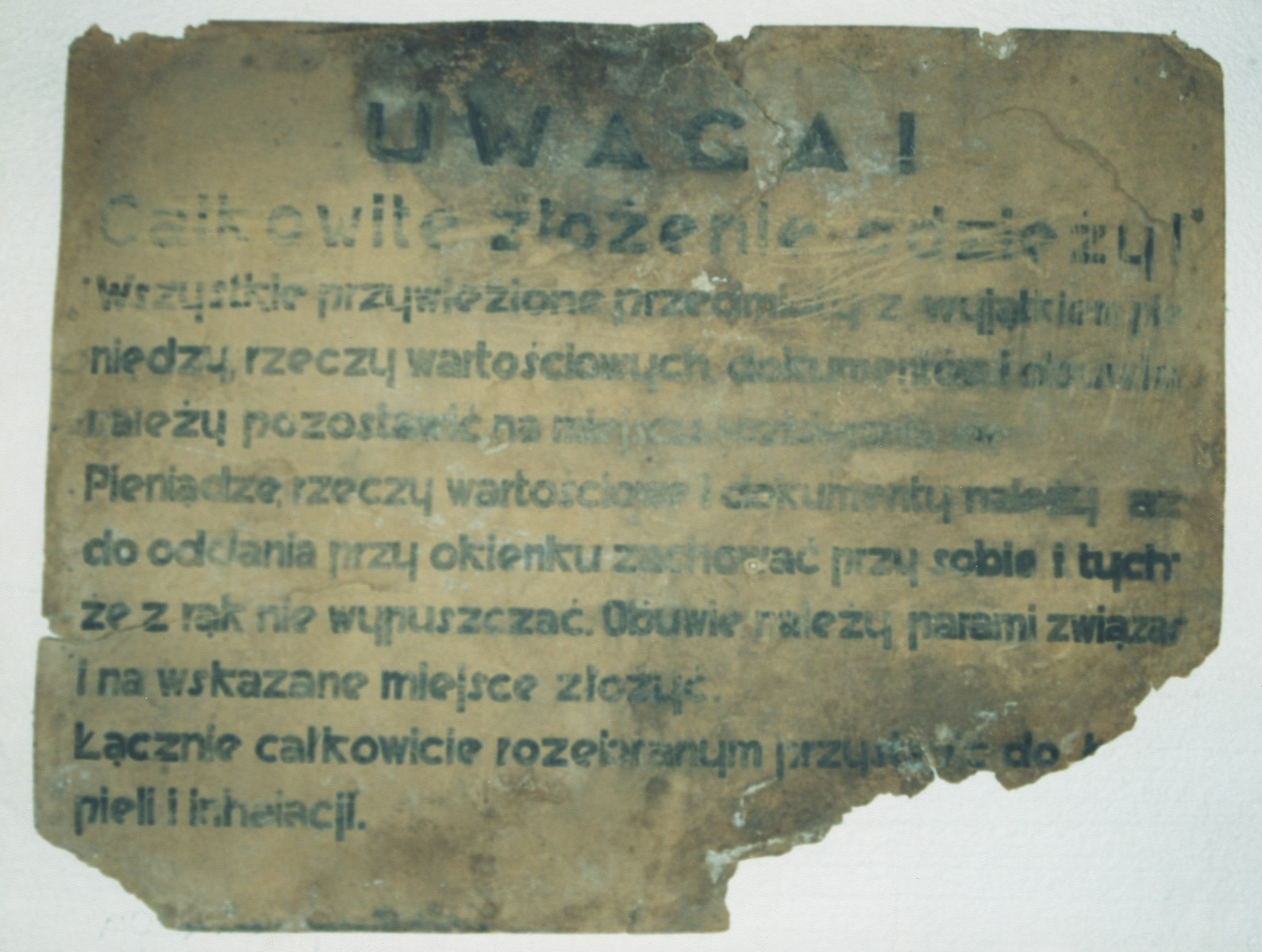
Polish-language sign. Reads: "Attention! All belongings must be handed in at the counter except for money, documents and other valuables, which you must keep with you. Shoes should be tied together in pairs and placed in the area marked for shoes. Afterward, one must go completely naked to the showers."

Bełżec "processing" zone consisted of two sections surrounded by a high barbed wire fence camouflaged with cut fir branches: Camp 1, which included the victims' unloading area with two undressing barracks further up; as well as Camp 2, which contained the gas chambers and the mass graves dug by the crawler excavator. The two zones were completely screened from each other and connected only by a narrow corridor called der Schlauch, or "the Tube". All arriving Jews disembarked from the trains at a platform in the reception zone. They were met by SS-Scharführer Fritz Jirmann (Irmann) standing at the podium with a loudspeaker, and were told by the Sonderkommando men that they had arrived at a transit camp. To ready themselves for the communal shower, women and children were separated from men. The disrobed new arrivals were forced to run along a fenced-off path to the gas chambers, leaving them no time to absorb where they were. The process was conducted as quickly as possible amid constant screaming by the Germans. At times, a handful of Jews were selected at the ramp to perform all the manual work involved with extermination.

The wooden gas chambers—which were built with double walls that were insulated by earth packed between them—were disguised as the shower barracks, so that the victims would not realise the true purpose of the facility. The gassing itself, which took about 30 minutes, was conducted by Hackenholt with the Ukrainian guards and a Jewish aide. Removing the bodies from the gas chambers, burying them, sorting and repairing the victims' clothing for shipping was performed by Sonderkommando work-details. The workshops for the Jewish prisoners and the barracks for the Ukrainian guards were separated from the "processing" zone behind an embankment of the old Otto Line with the barbed wire on top. Most Jews from the corpse-unit (the Totenjuden) were murdered periodically and replaced by new arrivals, so that they would neither organise a revolt nor survive to tell about the camp's purpose. The German SS and the administration were housed in two cottages outside the camp.

== Camp operation ==
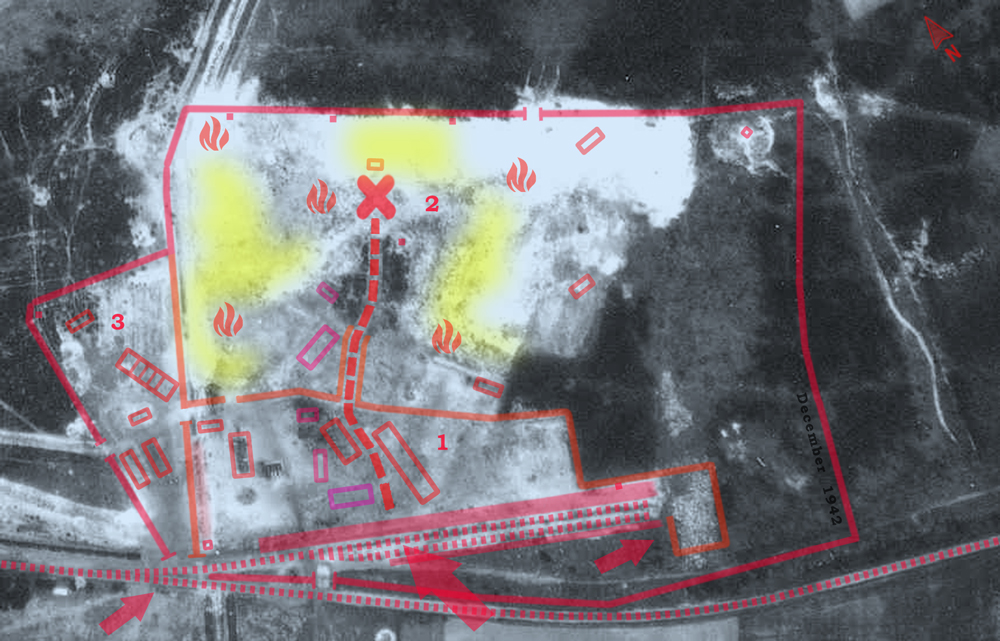
Aerial photograph of Bełżec camp perimeter taken in 1944 by the Luftwaffe. Known structures are gone except for the brick-and-mortar garage and auto-shop for the SS, whose foundations still exist today (lower left). Across the fence (left), separated from the main camp, the Hiwi guards' accommodations with kitchen as well as sorting and packing yard for victims possessions. Dismantled barracks can still be seen surrounded by walking sand. The railway unloading platform, with two parallel ramps, marked with red arrow. A smaller arrow shows the holding pen for Jews still waiting to be "processed". Location of gas chambers marked with a cross. Undressing and hair-cropping area marked with rectangle, with fenced-out "Sluice" into the woods, obstructing the view of the surroundings. Cremation pyres and ash pits (yellow), upper half.

The history of Bełżec can be divided into two (or three) periods of operation. The first phase, from 17 March to the end of June 1942, was marked by the existence of smaller gas chambers housed in barracks constructed of planks and insulated with sand and rubber. Bełżec was the first killing centre of Operation Reinhard. There were many technical difficulties with the early attempts at mass extermination. The gassing installation was imperfect and usually only one or two rooms were working, causing a backlog. In the first three months, 80,000 people were murdered and buried in pits covered with a shallow layer of earth. The victims were Jews deported from the Lublin Ghetto and its vicinity. The original three gas chambers were found insufficient for completing their purpose.

The second phase of extermination began in July 1942, when new gas chambers were built of brick and mortar on a lightweight foundation, thus enabling the facility to "process" Jews of the two largest agglomerations nearby including the Kraków and Lwów Ghettos. The wooden gas chambers were dismantled. The new building was 24 meters long and 10 meters wide and had six gas chambers, insulated with cement walls. It could handle over 1,000 victims at a time. The design was soon replicated by the other two Operation Reinhard extermination camps: Sobibor and Treblinka.

There was a hand-painted sign on the new building that read Stiftung Hackenholt or Hackenholt Foundation named after the SS man who designed it. Until December 1942, at least 350,000 to 400,000 Jews were murdered in the new gas chambers. One Wehrmacht sergeant at the train station in Rzeszów, Wilhelm Cornides, recorded in his diary a conversation with a German policeman on 30 August 1942. The Bahnschutzpolizei told him: "trains filled with Jews pass almost daily through the railway yards and leave immediately on the way to the camp. They return swept clean most often the same evening." The last transport of Jews arrived at Bełżec on 11 December 1942. The buried remains often swelled in the heat as a result of putrefaction and the escape of gases. The surface layer of soil split. In October 1942, the exhumation and burning of all corpses was ordered to cover up the crime on direct orders from SS-Obergruppenführer Odilo Globocnik, the deputy of Reichsführer-SS Heinrich Himmler in Berlin. The bodies were placed on pyres made from rail tracks, splashed with petrol and burned over wood. The bones were collected and crushed. The last period of the camp's operation continued until June 1943 when the area was ploughed over, and disguised as a farm.

== Command structure ==
The camp's first commandant, Christian Wirth, lived very close to the camp in a house which also served as a kitchen for the SS as well as an armoury. He later moved to the Lublin airfield camp, to oversee Operation Reinhard till the end. After the German takeover of Italy in 1943, he was transferred by Globocnik to serve along with him in his hometown of Trieste. They set up the San Sabba concentration and transit camp there, killing up to 5,000 prisoners and sending 69 Holocaust trains to Auschwitz. Wirth received the Iron Cross in April 1944. The following month he was killed by partisans whilst travelling in an open-top car in what is now western Slovenia. After the camp's closure, his successor there SS-Hauptsturmführer Gottlieb Hering was transferred to Poniatowa concentration camp temporarily until the massacres of the Aktion Erntefest, and later followed Wirth and Globocnik to Trieste. After the war ended, Hering served for a short time as the chief of Criminal Police of Heilbronn in the American zone, and died in autumn 1945 in a hospital. Lorenz Hackenholt survived the defeat of Germany, but disappeared in 1945 without a trace.

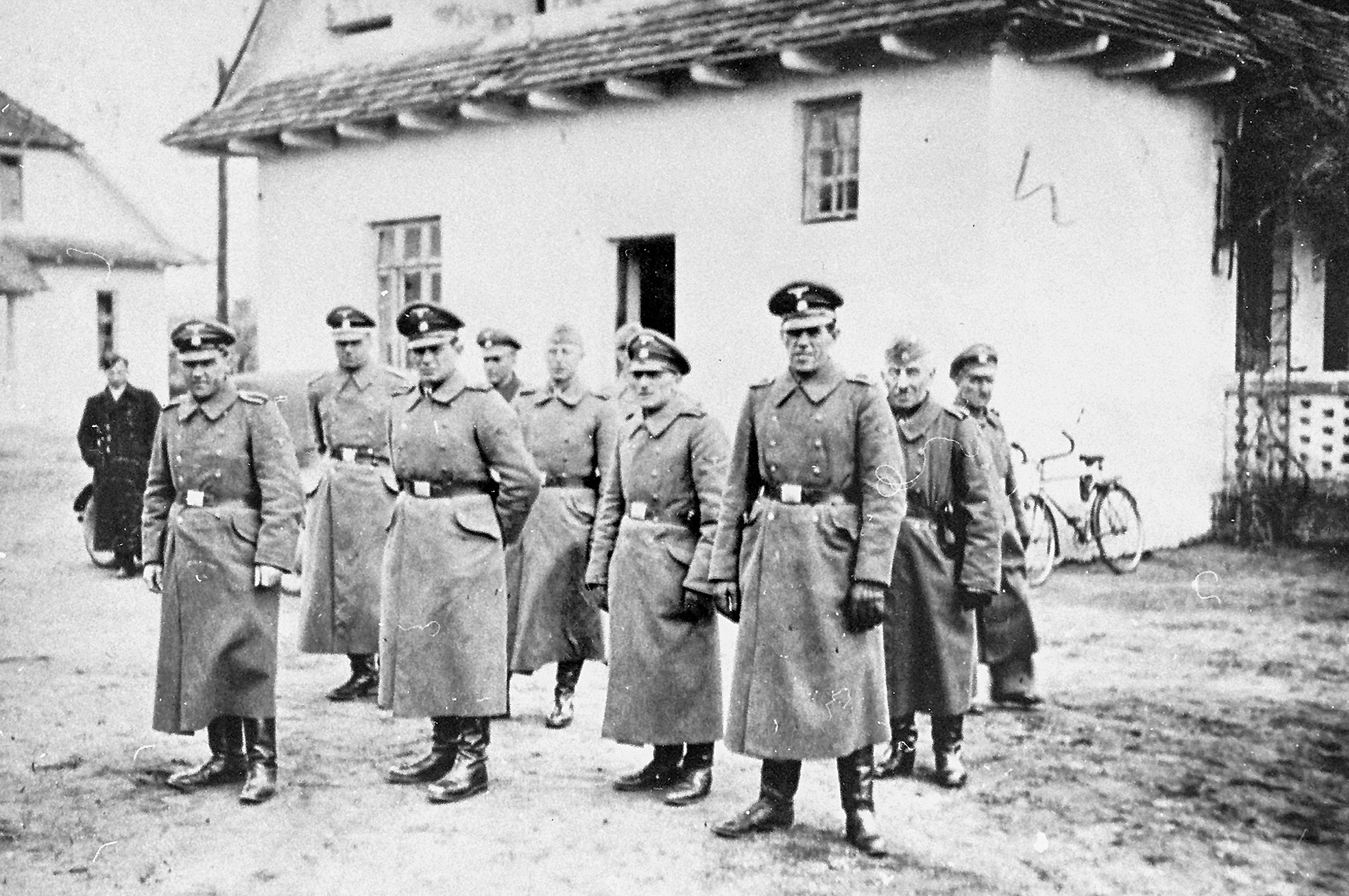
Bełżec extermination camp SS staff, 1942. from right to left: Heinrich Barbl, Artur Dachsel, Lorenz Hackenholt, Ernst Zierke, Karl Gringers, (unknown), Reinhold Feiks, Karl Alfred Schluch, and Friedrich Tauscher (front left).

Only seven former members of the SS-Sonderkommando Bełżec were indicted 20 years later in Munich. Of these, just one, Josef Oberhauser (leader of the SS guard platoon), was brought to trial in 1964, and sentenced to four years and six months in prison, of which he served half before being released.

=== Camp guards ===
Belzec camp guards included German Volksdeutsche and up to 120 former Soviet prisoners of war (mostly Ukrainians) organised into four platoons. Following Operation Barbarossa, all of them underwent special training at the Trawniki SS camp division before they were posted as "Hiwis" (German abbreviation for Hilfswilligen, lit. "those willing to help") in the concentration camps as guards and gas chamber operators. They provided the bulk of Wachmänner collaborators in all major killing sites of the Final Solution.

== Gas chambers ==
A detailed description of how the gas chambers at Belzec were managed came in 1945 from Kurt Gerstein, head of Technical Disinfection Services, who used to deliver Zyklon B to Auschwitz from the company Degesch during the Holocaust. In his postwar report written at a Rottweil hotel while in French custody, Gerstein described his visit to Belzec on 18 or 19 August 1942. He witnessed there the unloading of 45 cattle cars crowded with 6,700 Jews deported from the Lwów Ghetto less than a hundred kilometres away, of whom 1,450 were already dead on arrival from suffocation and thirst. The remaining new arrivals were marched naked in batches to the gas chambers, beaten with whips to squeeze tighter inside:

Unterscharführer Hackenholt was making great efforts to get the engine running. But it doesn't go. Captain Wirth comes up. I can see he is afraid because I am present at a disaster. Yes, I see it all and I wait. My stopwatch showed it all, 50 minutes, 70 minutes, and the diesel did not start. (Note: Affidavit of SS-Scharführer Erich Fuchs (8.4.63: 208 AR-Z 251/59, vol. 9, pp. 1784 f.) in the Sobibór-Bolender trial about the installation of the gas chambers would indicate that the engine disassembled from a tank or a lorry might have been fueled by gasoline or diesel.) The people wait inside the gas chambers. In vain. They can be heard weeping "like in the synagogue", says Professor Pfannenstiel, (Note: Before World War II, Pfannenstiel headed the ominous German Society for Race Hygiene (Deutsche Gesellschaft für Rassenhygiene) as Professor of Hygiene at the University of Marburg in Germany, leading to the development of T4 programme some time later.) his eyes glued to a window in the wooden door. Furious, Captain Wirth lashes the Ukrainian assisting Hackenholt twelve, thirteen times, in the face. After 2 hours and 49 minutes—the stopwatch recorded it all—the diesel started. Up to that moment, the people [locked] in those four crowded chambers were still alive, four times 750 persons in four times 45 cubic meters. (Note: The bricks-and-mortar building with the new gas chambers had six cubicles, each about 25 sq. m. It is almost impossible to squeeze such a large crowd [i.e. 750 people] into such a small space. The total of 750 victims per gas chamber was provided by the camp's commandant Christian Wirth to a company of high-ranking SS officers who visited the camp in the middle of Aug. 1942 including Gerstein himself. The above figure was stated in his Gerstein Report at face value. —from "End Notes" by Robin O'Neil.) Another 25 minutes elapsed. Many were already dead, that could be seen through the small window because an electric lamp inside lit up the chamber for a few moments. After 28 minutes, only a few were still alive. Finally, after 32 minutes, all were dead ... Dentists hammered out gold teeth, bridges and crowns. In the midst of them stood Captain Wirth. He was in his element, and showing me a large can full of teeth, he said: "See for yourself the weight of that gold! It's only from yesterday and the day before. You can't imagine what we find every day—dollars, diamonds, gold. You'll see for yourself!"

— Kurt Gerstein, Gerstein Report

== Closure and dismantlement ==
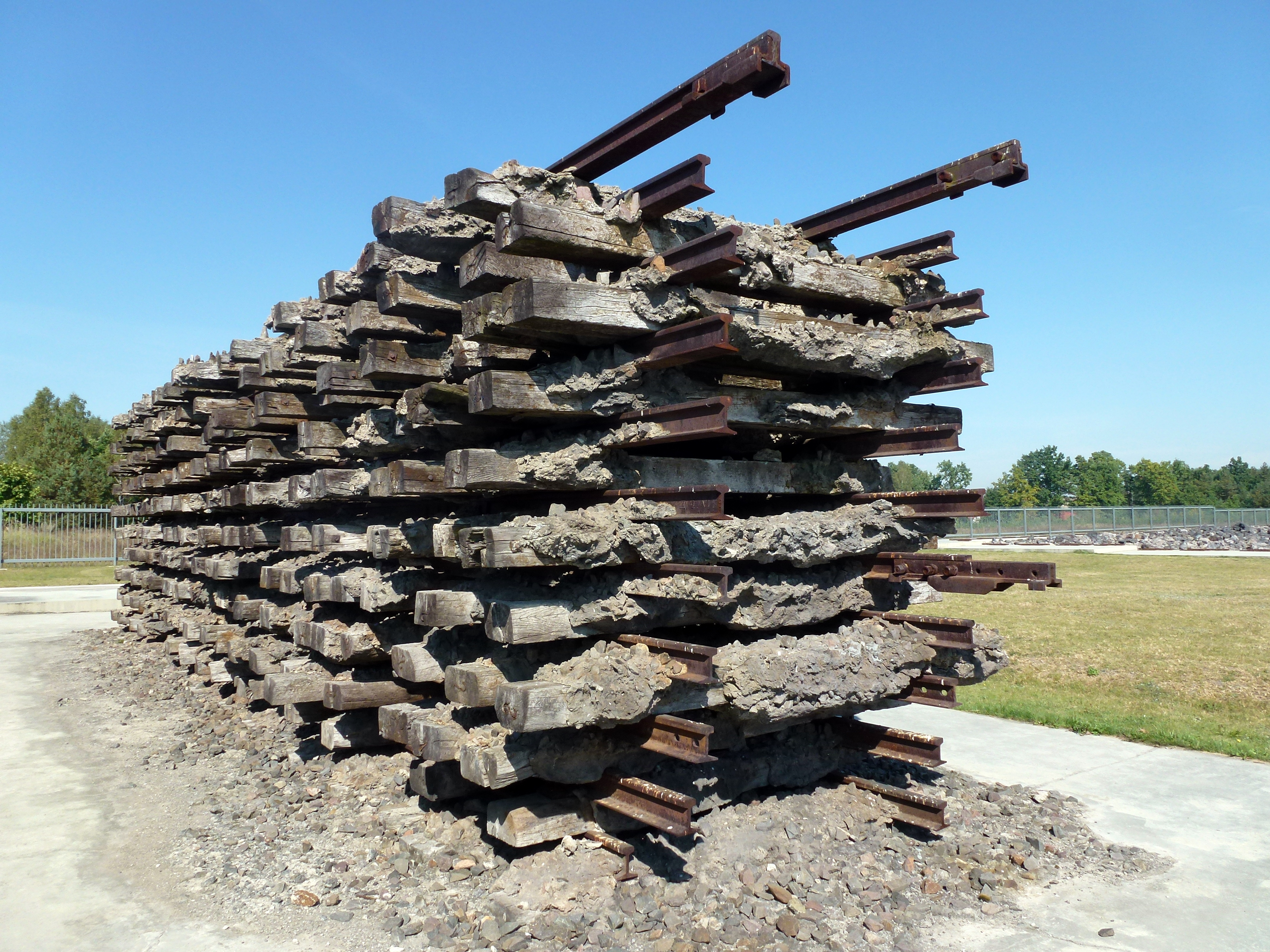
Bełżec mausoleum. Unloading ramp and cremation rails (historical artefacts).

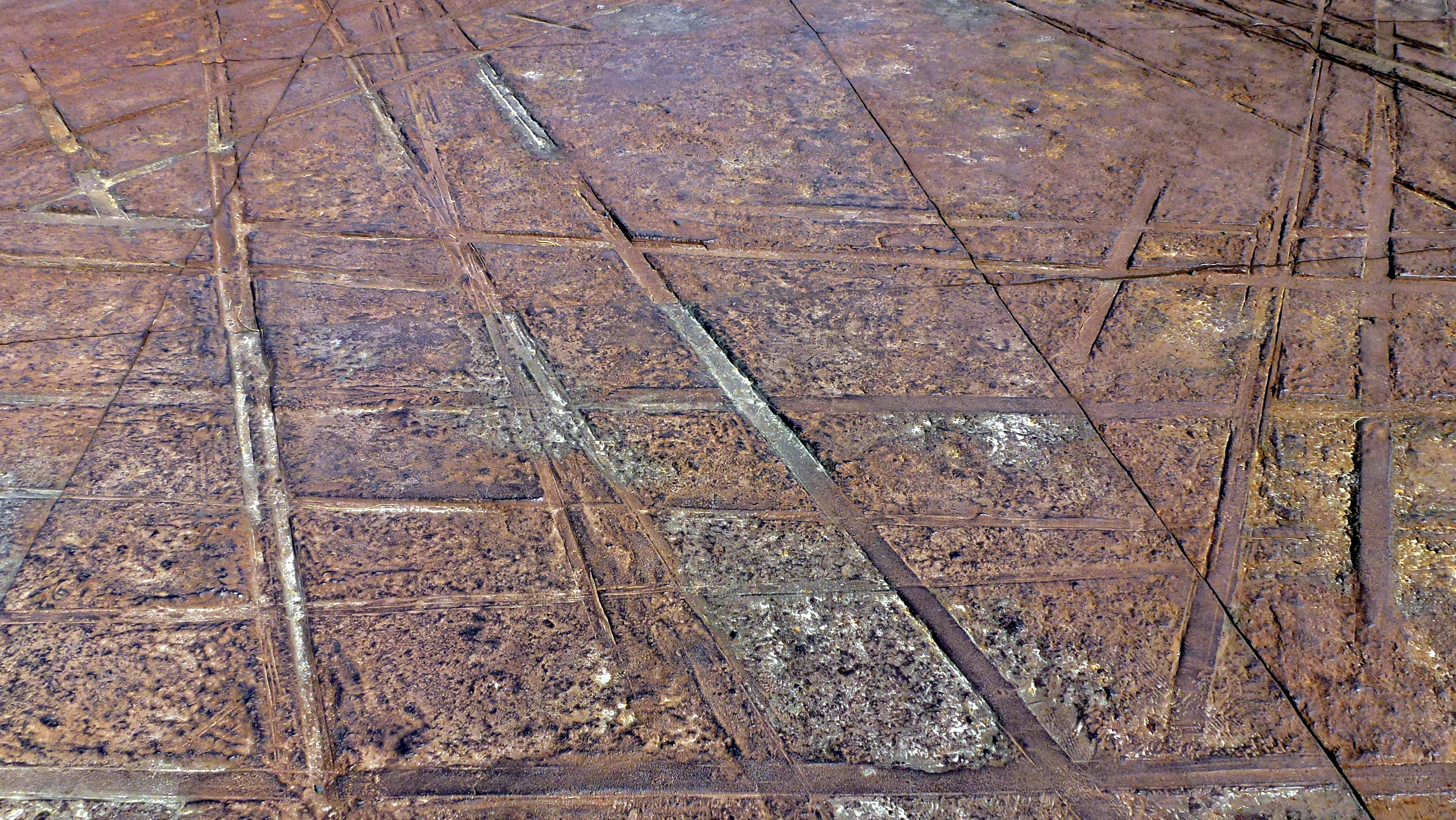
Portion of the memorial in Bełżec. Cemented rails built in place of the original unloading ramp, lead in all directions from which the Jews were brought in.

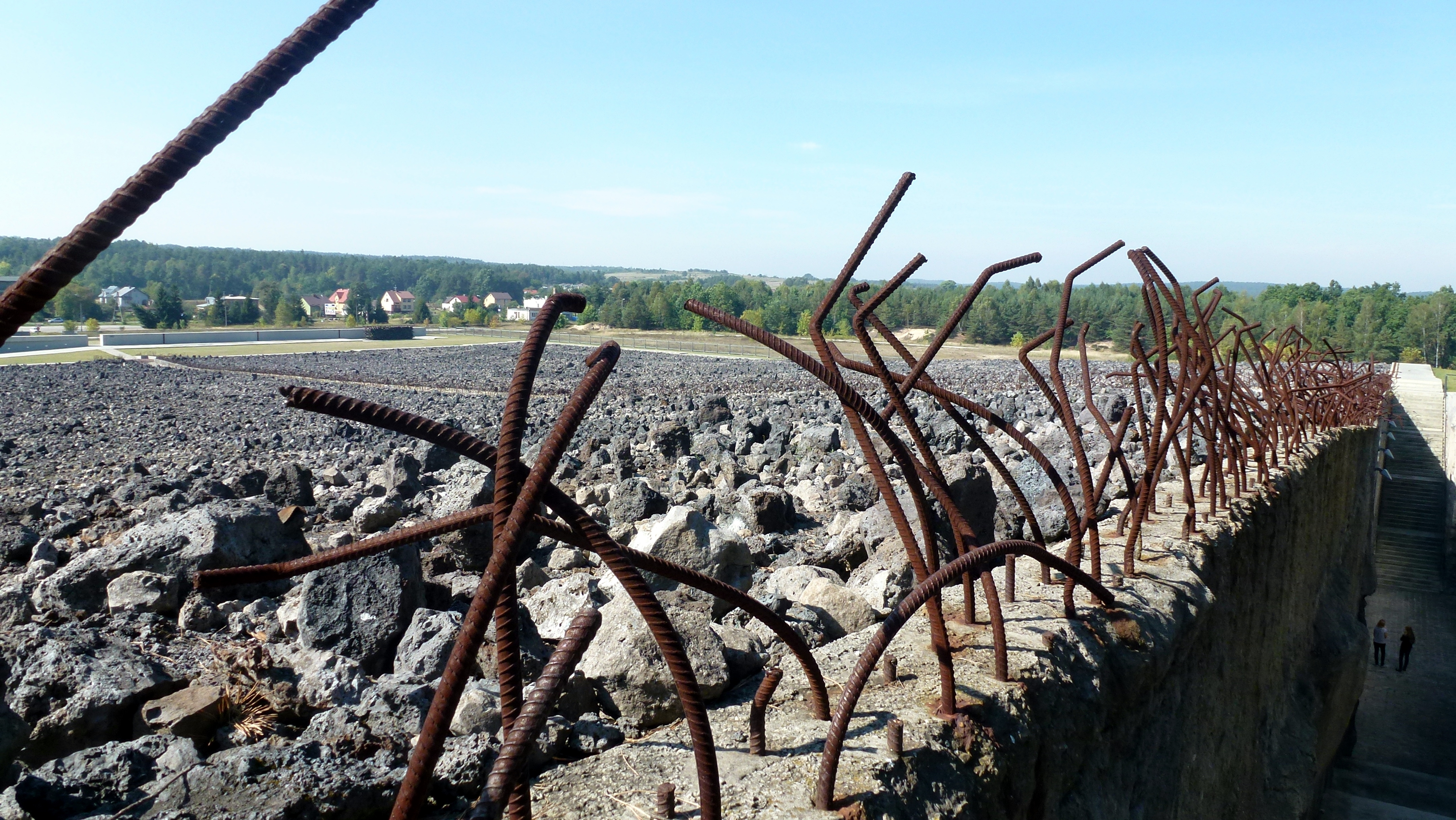
The field of crushed stone serves as grave marker; the entire perimeter contains human ashes mixed with sand.

In the last phase of the camp operations, all prior mass graves were unearthed by a mechanical digger. It was the result of direct orders from the Nazi leadership (possibly from Himmler), soon after the Soviet Katyn massacre of 22,000 Polish soldiers was discovered in Russia. At Katyn, the German-led exhumations by the international Katyn Commission revealed details of the mass murder by examining preserved bodies. The Germans attempted to use the commission's results to drive a wedge between the Allies. All corpses buried at Bełżec were secretly exhumed and then gradually cremated on long open-air pyres, part of the country-wide plan known as the Sonderaktion 1005. Bone fragments were pulverised and mixed with the ashes to hide the evidence of mass murder. The site was planted with small firs and wild lupines and all camp structures were dismantled.

The last train with 300 Jewish Sonderkommando prisoners who performed the clean-up operation departed to Sobibor extermination camp for gassing in late June 1943. They were told that they were being evacuated to Germany. Any equipment that could be reused was taken by the German and Ukrainian personnel to the concentration camp Majdanek. Wirth's house and the neighbouring SS building, which had been the property of the Polish Railway before the war, were not demolished. After locals started digging for valuables in Bełżec, the Germans installed a permanent guard so that their mass murder would not come to light. SS personnel with work commandos turned the camp into a fake farm with one Ukrainian SS guard assigned to settle there permanently with his family. This model for guarding and disguising murder sites was also adopted at the Treblinka and Sobibor death camps.

== Victims ==
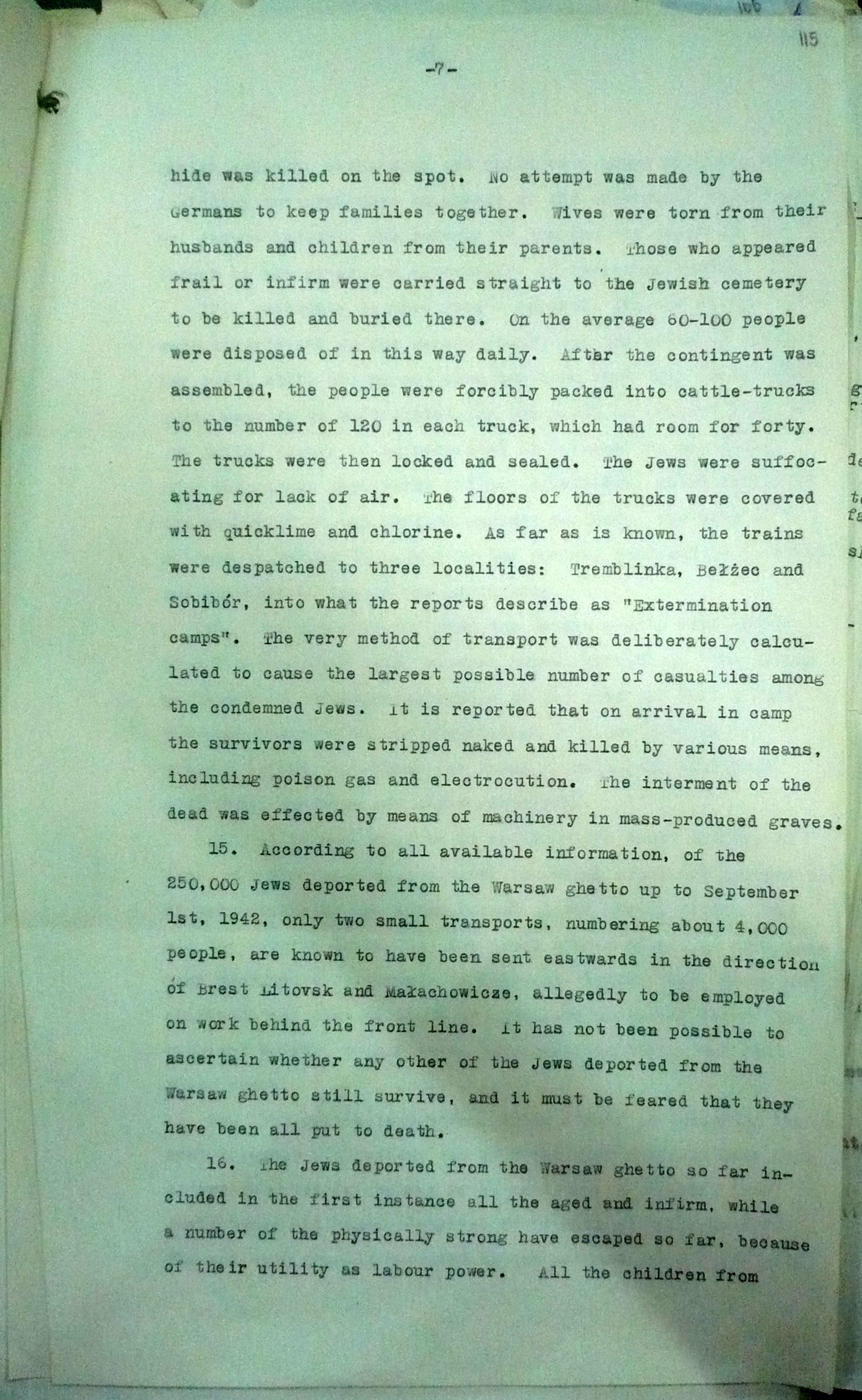
Page 7 from "Raczyński's Note" with Treblinka, Bełżec and Sobibor extermination camps – part of official note of Polish government-in-exile to Anthony Eden, 10 December 1942

The historian Eugeniusz Szrojt in his 1947 study published by the Bulletin of the Main Commission for the Investigation of German Crimes in Poland (Biuletyn Głównej Komisji Badania Zbrodni Niemieckich w Polsce, 1947) following an investigation by GKBZNwP which began in 1945, estimated the number of people murdered in Bełżec at 600,000. This number became widely accepted in the literature. Raul Hilberg gave a figure of 550,000. Yitzhak Arad accepted 600,000 as minimum, and the sum in his table of Bełżec deportations by the city exceeded 500,000. Józef Marszałek calculated 500,000. British historian Robin O'Neil once gave an estimate of about 800,000 based on his investigations at the site. German historians Dieter Pohl and Peter Witte, gave an estimate of 480,000 to 540,000. Michael Tregenza stated that it would have been possible to have buried up to one million victims on the site although the true number of people murdered is probably around half that number.

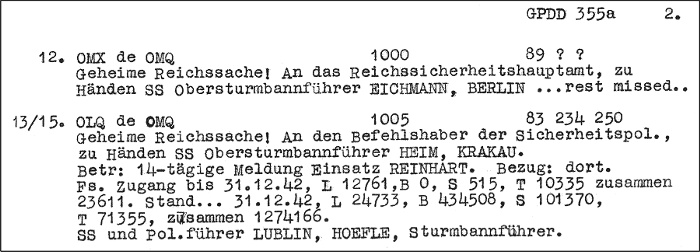
The 1943 Höfle Telegram detailed that 434,508 Jews had been deported to Bełżec by December 1942.

The crucial piece of evidence came from the declassified Höfle Telegram sent to Berlin on 11 January 1943 by Operation Reinhard's Chief of Staff Hermann Höfle. It was published in 2001 by Stephen Tyas and Peter Witte. The radio telegram indicated that 434,508 Jews were deported to Bełżec through 31 December 1942 based on numbers shared by the SS with the state-run Deutsche Reichsbahn (DRG). The camp had ceased to operate for mass-murder by then. The clean-up commando of up to 500 prisoners remained in the camp, disinterring the bodies and burning them. The Sonderkommando was transported to Sobibor extermination camp around August 1943 and murdered on arrival. "In our view," wrote Pohl & Witte in 2001, "there is no evidence to justify a figure higher than that of 600,000 victims."

The Holocaust train records were notoriously incomplete as revealed by postwar analysis by the Main Commission for the Investigation of German Crimes against the Polish Nation. The difference between the "low-end" figure and other estimates can be explained by the lack of exact and detailed sources on the deportations statistics. Thus, Y. Arad writes, that he had to rely, in part, on Yizkor books of Jewish ghettos, which were not guaranteed to give the exact estimates of the numbers of deportees. He also relied on partial German railway documentation, from which the number of trains could be gleaned. Some assumptions had to be made about the number of persons per each Holocaust train. The Deutsche Reichsbahn calculations were predetermined with the carrying capacity of each trainset set up at 50 boxcars, each loaded with 50 prisoners, which was routinely disregarded by the SS cramming trains up to 200% capacity for the same price.

Höfle's numbers were repeated in the Korherr Report suggesting their common origin. Other sources, like Westermann's report, contain the exact data about the number of deported persons, but only estimates of the numbers of those who died in transit.

The vast majority of victims were Jewish, with an unknown number of Roma, Sinti, and Soviets prisoners also murdered there.

== Post-war ==
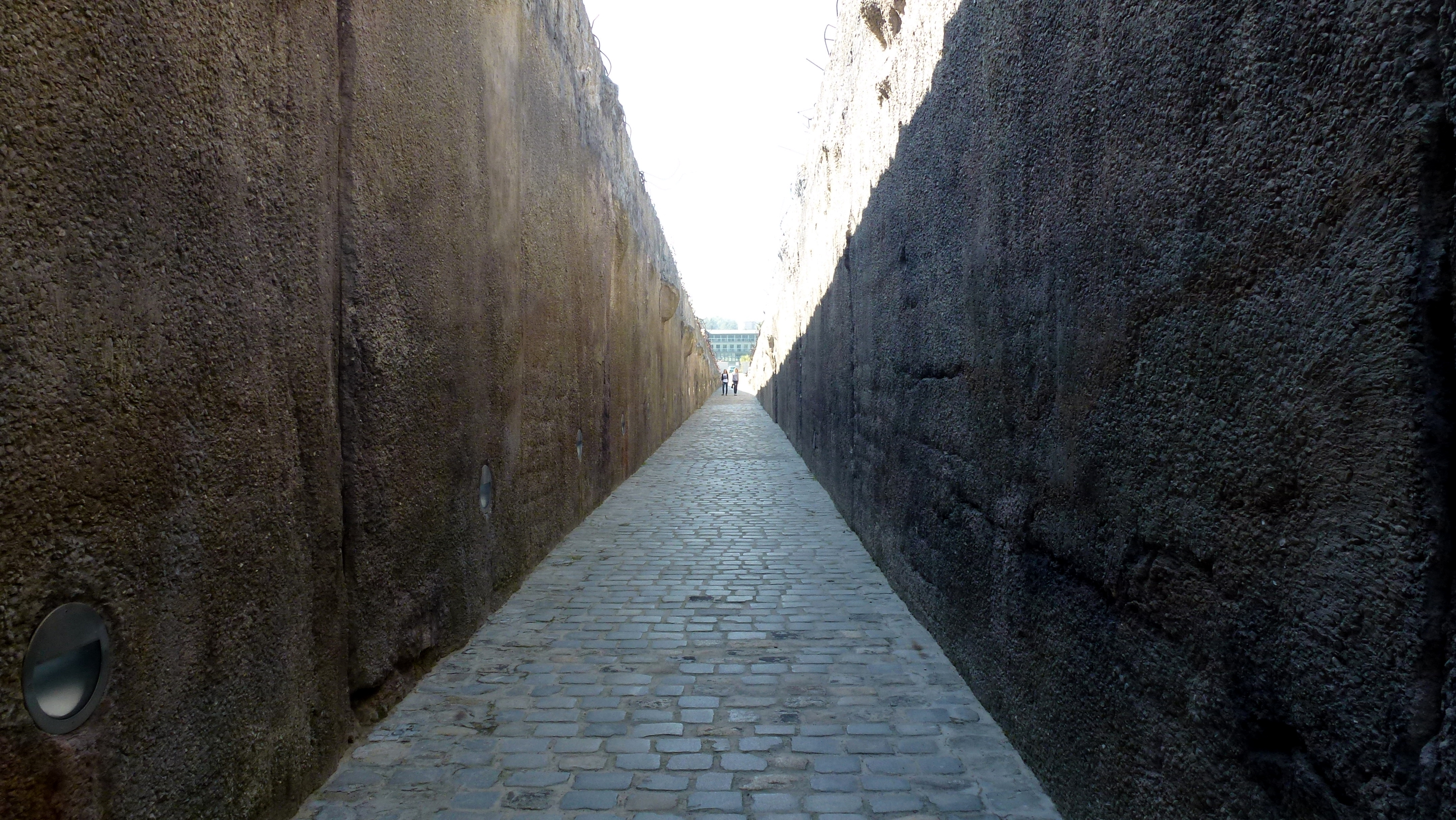
Symbolic "death road" (portion of the memorial in Bełżec). Underground passage built in place of former "Sluice" into the gas chambers, evokes the feelings of no escape.

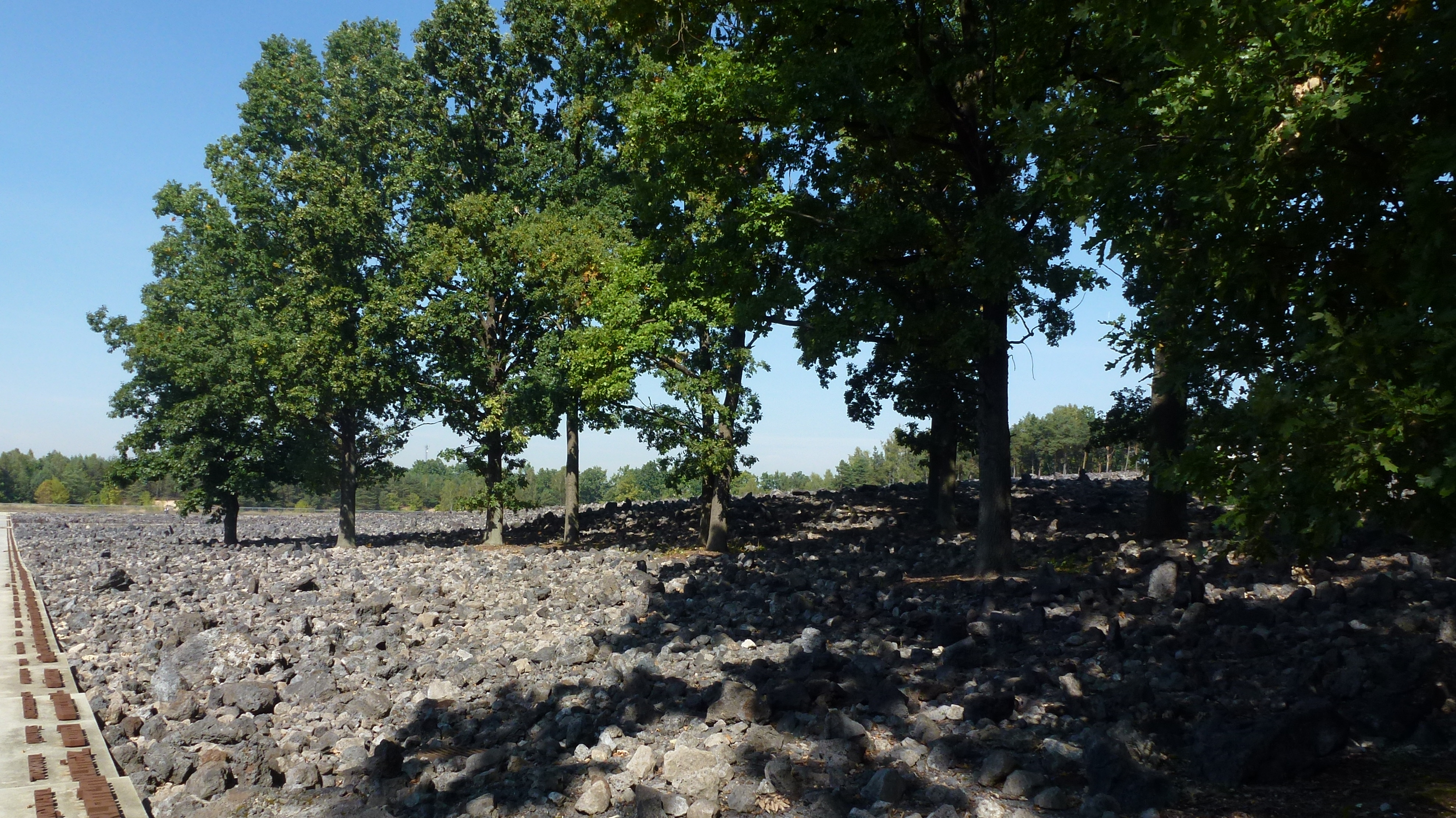
Belzec extermination camp memorial. During the construction of the Mausoleum trees planted by the SS were removed and only the oaks, that witnessed the genocide, were retained.

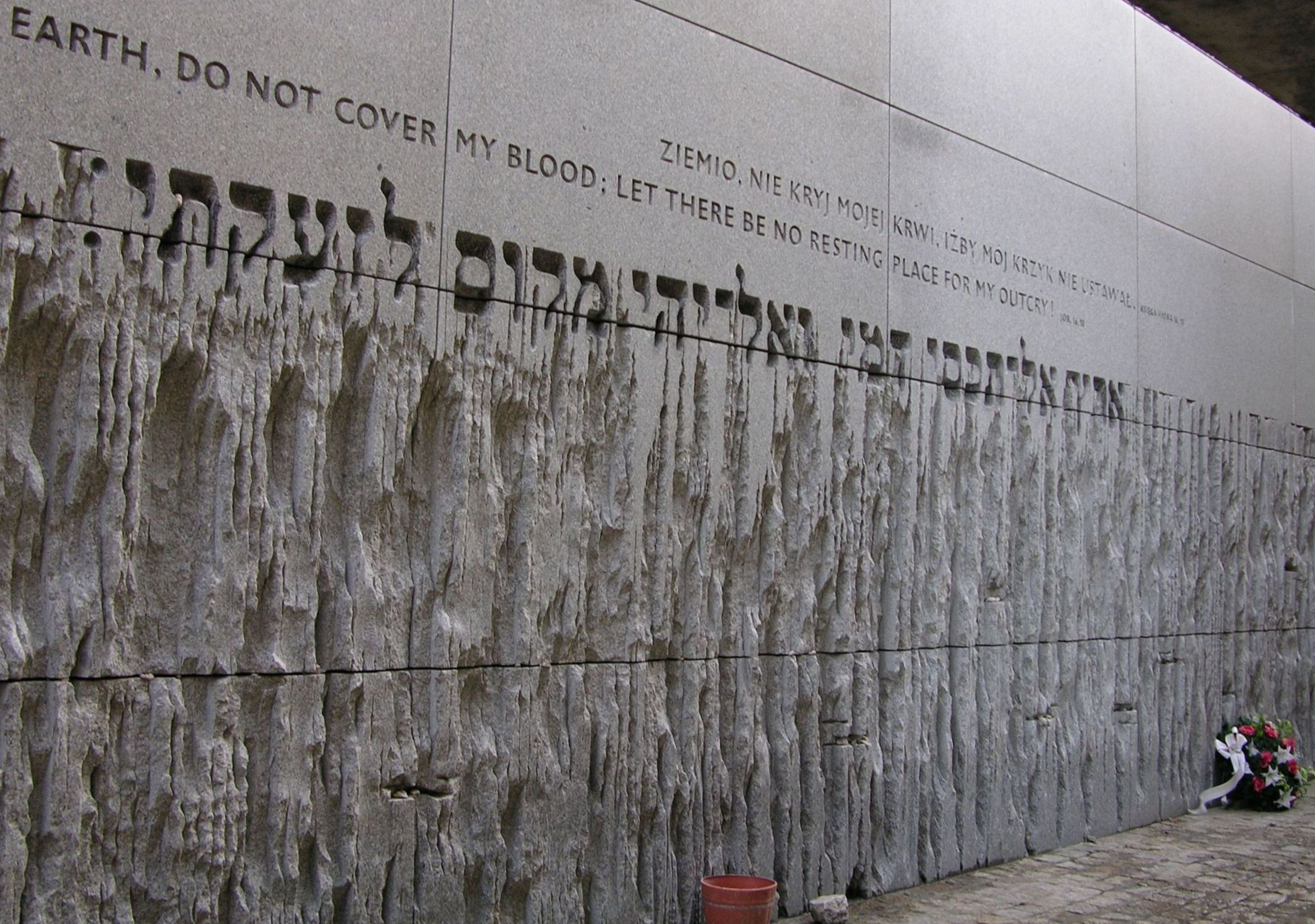
The ohel of the Belzec mausoleum

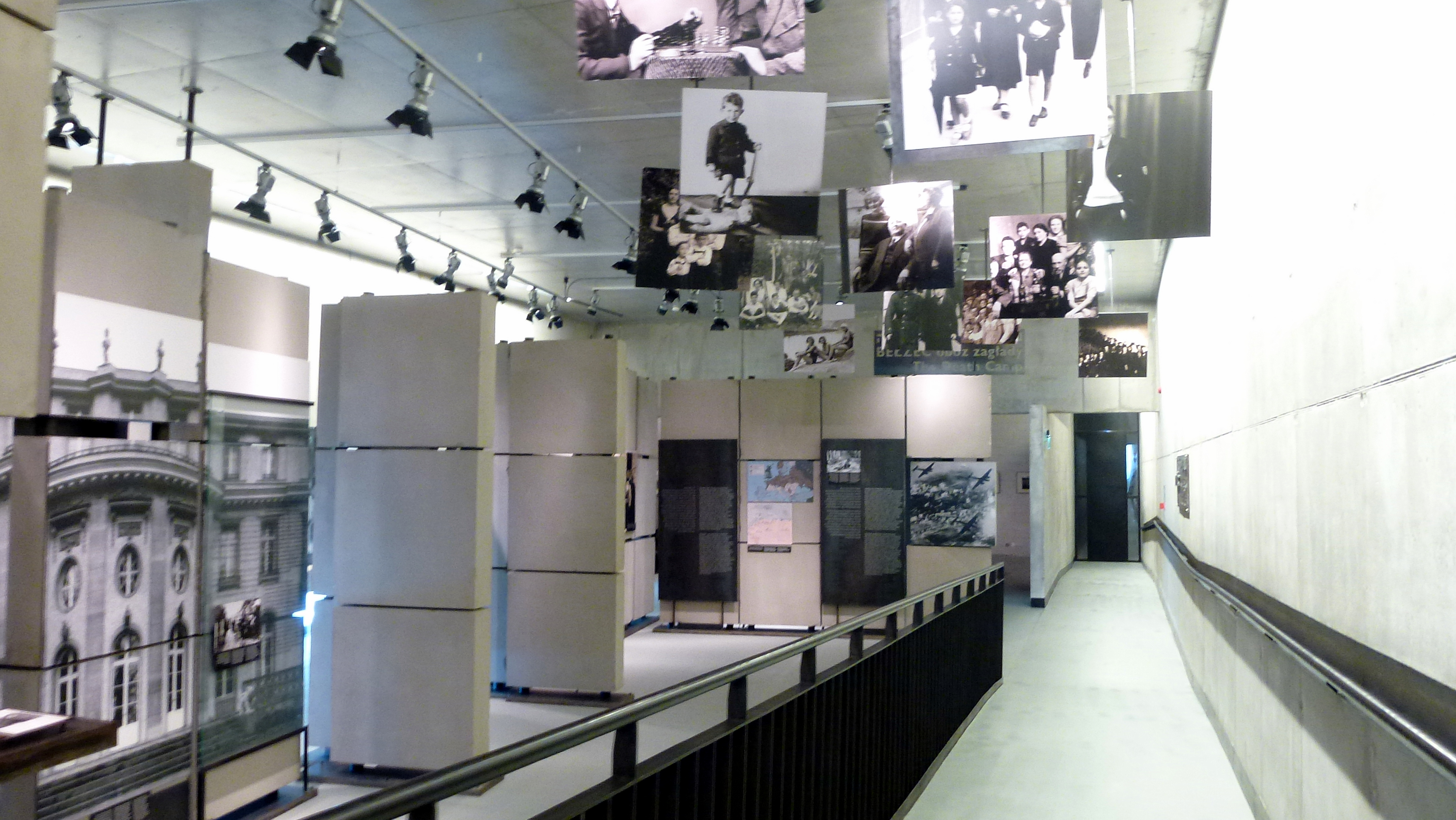
Belzec extermination camp museum

Grave robbing at the site resumed after the German guard fled for the approaching Red Army. In 1945, the Lublin District Commission for the Investigation of German Crimes conducted an investigation into the crimes in Bełżec. The mass graves at the site were dug up by graverobbers seeking gold and valuables. In 1945 provincial authorities and the Tomaszów Lubelski Jewish Committee discussed the continuing plunder of the site. In 1945 Szmul Pelc, the chair of the committee of the Jewish Committee, was murdered by local graverobbers. Investigations of grave digging continued through the late 1950s. While Lublin District Commission published the results of their investigation in 1947, the site itself continued to be neglected and memory of the site was suppressed as very few of the camp's victims were Polish, and few of the camp's primarily Jewish victims survived. Beginning in the second half of the 1950s the pursuit by Germany itself of the German perpetrators revived interest in the site. The Soviet trials of Russian camp personnel, held in Kiev and Krasnodar in the early 1960s soon followed.

In the 1960s, the grounds of the former Bełżec camp were fenced off. The first monuments were erected, although the area did not correspond to the actual size of the camp during its operation due to lack of proper evidence and modern forensic research. Some commercial development took place in areas formerly belonging to it. Also, its remote location on the Polish–Soviet border meant that few people visited the site before the revolutions of 1989 and the return of democracy. It was largely forgotten and poorly maintained.

Following the collapse of the Communist dictatorship in 1989, the situation began to change. As the number of visitors to Poland interested in Holocaust sites increased, more of them came to Bełżec. In the 1990s the camp appeared badly neglected, even though it was cleaned by students from Bełżec school. In the late 1990s extensive investigations were carried out on the camp grounds to determine precisely the camp's extent and provide greater understanding of its operation. Buildings constructed after the war on the camp grounds were removed. In 2004, Bełżec became a new branch of the Majdanek State Museum. New official monuments commemorating the camp's victims were unveiled.

One of the prime benefactors behind the new memorial at Bełżec was Miles Lerman, an American Holocaust survivor whose own parents were murdered in Bełżec, raising approximately 5 million dollars with the help of the Polish government and the American Jewish Committee. Another prominent Holocaust survivor with a connection to Bełżec is philanthropist Anita Ekstein, former national chair of March of the Living Canada. Anita Ekstein was born in the Lviv area and was hidden as a child by Righteous Poles during the Holocaust. Her mother, Ethel Helfgott, was among the victims in Bełżec. Anita Ekstein has led many groups of students on educational trips to Poland where she shares her Holocaust story. She first visited Bełżec in 2005, a year after the new memorial opened, and discovered her mother's name inscribed on the memorial wall on Mother's Day.

== Archaeological studies ==
From late 1997 until early 1998, a thorough archaeological survey of the site was conducted by a team led by two Polish scientists including Andrzej Kola, director of the Underwater Archaeological Department at the University of Toruń, and Mieczysław Góra, senior curator of the Museum of Archaeology and Ethnography in Łódź. The team identified the railway sidings and remains of a number of buildings. They also found 33 mass graves, the largest of which had an area of 480 m^{2} (5,200 sq ft) and was 4.8 m (16 ft) deep. The total volume of these mass graves was estimated at 21,000 m^{3} (0.74 million ft^{3}). Air photo analysis suggests that these 33 mass graves were not the only graves at Bełżec extermination camp.

All graves discovered by archaeologists contained large amounts of human cremation remains, and 10 graves also contained unburned human remains, which Prof. Kola described as follows: "Deposition of corpses in the water-bearing layers or in very damp structure of the ground just above that layer, with the difficulty of air penetration, because of the depth, caused the changes of the deposited bodies into adipocere. In some graves the layer of corpses reached the thickness of c. 2.00 m."

== Survivors ==
It is believed that some 50 Jews might have escaped from Bełżec and only seven were still alive at the war's end. An unknown number of prisoners jumped out from the moving Holocaust trains on the way to the camp, at their own peril. The railway embankments used to be lined with bodies.

There were only two Jewish escapees from the camp who shared their testimony with the Polish Main Commission for the Investigation of Nazi German Crimes. They were Rudolf Reder and Chaim Hirszman. While Reder submitted a deposition in January 1946 in Kraków, Hirszman was assassinated in March 1946 at his home, by so-called "cursed soldiers", from the anti-communist resistance organisation TOW. Following the war's end, Hirszman had joined MBP, a secret police organisation created by the new Stalinist regime in Poland, to crush the anti-communist underground. His murder was before he was able to give a full account of his experiences at the camp.

Rudolf Reder summarised his account of the Bełżec camp imprisonment in the book Bełżec, published in 1946 by the Jewish Historical Committee in Kraków with Preface by Nella Rost, his editor and literary helper. The book was illustrated with a map by Józef Bau, a Holocaust survivor who studied at the Academy of Fine Arts. It was reprinted in 1999 by the Auschwitz-Birkenau State Museum with translation by Margaret M. Rubel. In 1960, Reder's testimony became part of the German preparations for the Bełżec trial in Munich against eight former SS members of the extermination camp personnel. The accused were set free except for Oberhauser, who was sentenced to 4½ years of imprisonment, and released after serving half of his sentence.

== See also ==
- Bełżec trial of eight former SS staff of Bełżec extermination camp in the mid-1960s, Munich
- Chełmno trials of the Chełmno extermination camp personnel, held in Poland and in Germany, decided almost twenty years apart
- Grojanowski Report by Chełmno prisoner, Szlama Ber Winer
- List of Nazi concentration camps
- Majdanek trials, the longest Nazi war crimes trial in history
