= Christian Wirth =

Nazi German police chief and extermination camp commandant (1885–1944)

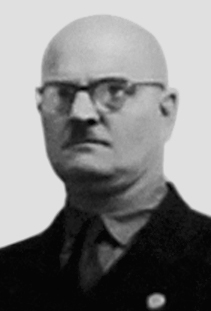
- Born: 24 November 1885; Oberbalzheim, Württemberg, German Empire
- Died: 26 May 1944 (aged 58); Hrpelje-Kozina, occupied Yugoslavia
- Burial place: Costermano, Italy
- Military career
- Allegiance: German Empire; Weimar Republic; Nazi Germany
- Branch: Schutzstaffel
- Rank: SS-Sturmbannführer
- Nicknames: (German: Christian der Grausame), Christian the Cruel
- Service number: NSDAP #420,383; SS #354,464
- Units: SS-Totenkopfverbände
- Commands: Action T4; Inspector of Operation Reinhard camps Bełżec, December 1941 — end of August 1942
- Awards: Iron Cross First Class; Order of the Crown (Württemberg)

Christian Wirth (German: [vɪʁt]; 24 November 1885 – 26 May 1944) was a German Schutzstaffel (SS) officer and leading Holocaust perpetrator who was one of the primary architects of the program to exterminate the Jewish people of Poland, known as Operation Reinhard. His nicknames included Christian the Cruel (German: Christian der Grausame), Stuka, and The Wild Christian due to the extremity of his behaviour among the SS and Trawniki guards and to the camp inmates and victims.

Wirth worked within the Action T4 program, in which people with disabilities were murdered by gassing or lethal injection, and then at implementing Operation Reinhard, by developing, almost single-handedly, the extermination camps for the purpose of mass murder. Wirth later served as Inspector of all the Reinhard Camps. He was killed in 1944 by the Yugoslav Partisans in Hrpelje-Kozina near Trieste after the conclusion of Operation Reinhard.

== Early life ==
Christian Wirth was born on 24 November 1885 in Oberbalzheim, Württemberg, part of the German Empire. The son of a master cooper, after attending elementary and continuation school, Wirth learned the sawyer's craft. From 1905 to 1910, he was a member of the Württemberg Grenadier Regiment 123. By 1910 Wirth had worked as a policeman in Heilbronn, but he soon moved to Stuttgart, where he was a detective of the police.

During the First World War, at his own request, he served as a non-commissioned officer in the army on the Western front, distinguished himself in battle, was wounded, and was highly decorated. Wirth was awarded the Iron Cross First Class, Iron Cross Second Class, and the Order of the Crown (Württemberg). After the war Wirth returned to Stuttgart in June 1919 and was promoted back to police detective sergeant.

== Family ==
Wirth married Maria Bantel and fathered two children.

== Early Nazi career ==
Wirth was one of the original members of the Nazi Party, joining for the first time in 1923, before it was outlawed briefly in Germany following the unsuccessful Hitler Beer Hall Putsch.

He again joined the Nazi Party as an Alter Kämpfer ("old fighter") on 1 January 1931 (#420,383). He joined the Sturmabteilung (SA) on 30 June 1933. From 7 December 1937 he was a volunteer of the Sicherheitsdienst (SD). On 10 August 1939, Wirth transferred from the SA to the Schutzstaffel (SS), attaining the rank of Obersturmführer (first lieutenant) by October (SS #354,464).

After the Nazi Party rose to national power in Germany, Wirth served in the Württemberg police force. He had previously been a police officer in 1910, before the onset of World War I. Wirth rose to become the captain of detectives (German: Kriminalkommissar) of the Kriminalpolizei (Kripo) in Stuttgart.

== Aktion T4 ==
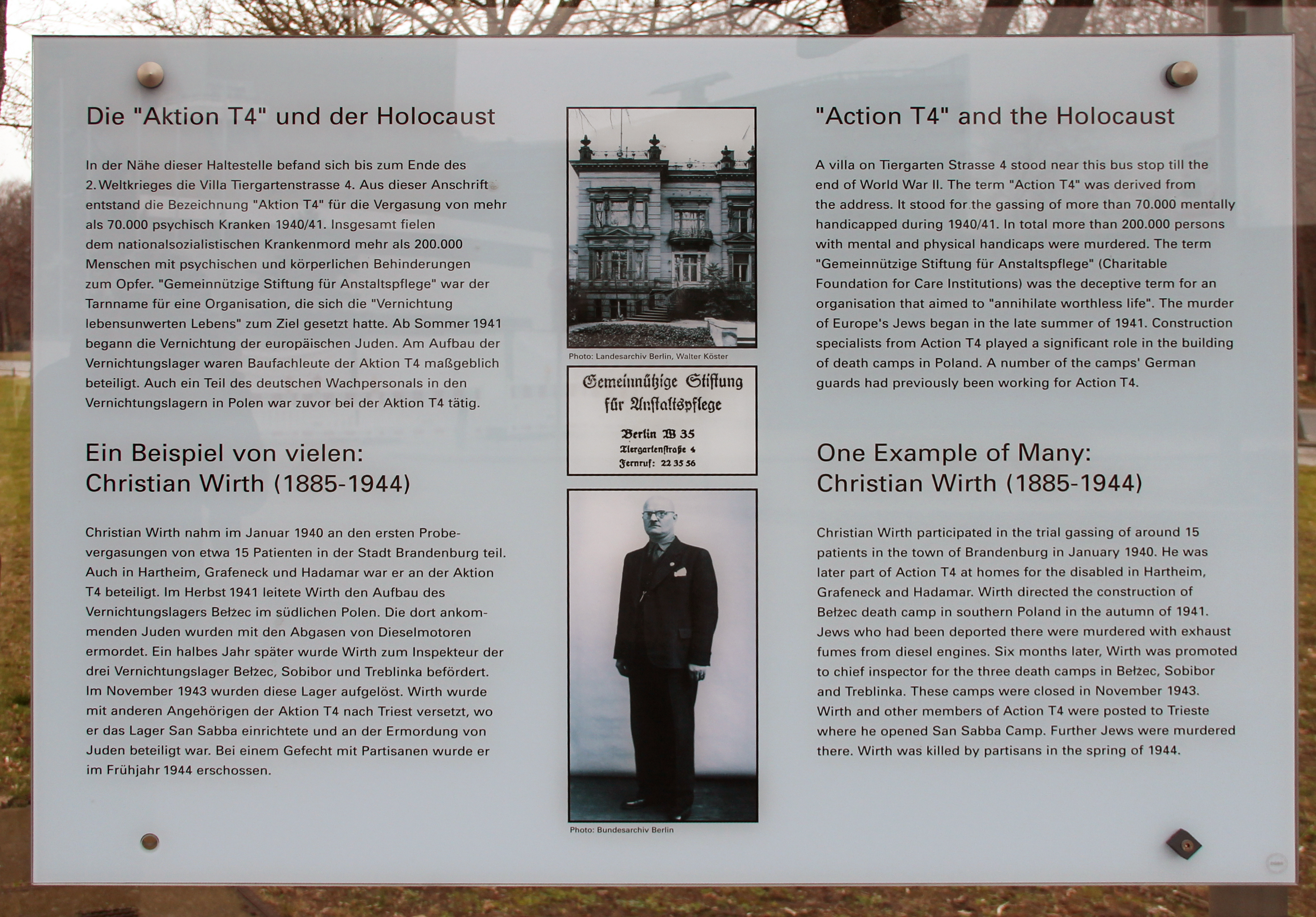
Memorial plaque, Herbert-von-Karajan-Straße 1 in Berlin-Tiergarten, Germany

At the end of 1939, Wirth, along with other Kripo police officers, was detached from the police for service with the Action T4 "euthanasia" program. These police officers served as nonmedical supervisors at the killing centers of the euthanasia program, and Wirth was chief among them. At the age of fifty-five, Wirth was among the oldest personnel involved in T-4. Wirth first set up office procedures at the "euthanasia" center at Grafeneck Castle in Württemberg. Shortly thereafter Wirth was transferred to the killing centre at Brandenburg an der Havel in Prussia as administrative director (the medical director was Dr. Irmfried Eberl).

In December 1939 or January 1940, Wirth was present when twenty to thirty German mental patients were subjected to the first known gassing experiment using carbon monoxide. This is where the idea to disguise the gas chambers as showers was introduced. Wirth continued to participate as a troubleshooter in the T-4 killing centers. For instance, when at Brandenburg a group of suspecting mental patients refused to enter the (disguised) gas chamber, Wirth coaxed them into the room by telling them that they had to enter it in order to receive clothing. But Wirth's most intimate connection with T-4 was at the Hartheim killing centre, where he was chief of the office staff and director of personnel. At Hartheim, Wirth oversaw paperwork as head of the registry office, directed the killing process as the individual responsible for security, and commanded the junior staff as director of personnel. Wirth was coarse and brutal, feared by his subordinates and known to use any means necessary to ensure a smooth killing operation. When four female patients at Hartheim were suspected of having contracted typhus, Wirth shot them to prevent the spread of disease to the staff.

Wirth's responsibility for murdering Jews began in September 1940, when handicapped Jews were first gassed at Brandenburg. In mid-1940, Wirth was appointed as an inspector of a dozen killing facilities in the Third Reich. He frequented the Hartheim killing centre, where Franz Stangl worked. Stangl, who was later the commandant of the Sobibór and Treblinka extermination camps, described Wirth in a 1971 interview:

Wirth was a gross and florid man. My heart sank when I met him. He stayed at Hartheim for several days that time and often came back. Whenever he was there he addressed us daily at lunch. And here it was again this awful verbal crudity: when he spoke about the necessity of this euthanasia operation, he was not speaking in humane or scientific terms, the way Dr. Werner at T-4 had described it to me. He laughed. He spoke of 'doing away with useless mouths', and that 'sentimental slobber' about such people made him 'puke'.

In mid-1941, Wirth was involved in the "euthanasia" program in western areas of Poland; his activity during this time is obscure. In August 1941 Wirth was transferred out of T-4.

== Operation Reinhard ==
After the T4 "euthanasia" program was halted, Nazi leadership came up with the "Final Solution to the Jewish Question". The first phase of the "Final Solution" was Operation Reinhard (German: Aktion Reinhard), headed by Odilo Globocnik. The first out of three Aktion Reinhard extermination camps was Bełżec. Since Wirth had previous experience in murdering with gas in the "involuntary euthanasia" program, Globocnik appointed him as the commandant of Bełżec in December 1941. Belzec became fully operational for gassing on or around 17 March 1942.

Before coming to Belzec, Wirth became acquainted with the gas vans in operation in Chełmno and in the eastern occupied territories of the Soviet Union and learned their advantages and disadvantages. This experience in euthanasia, where permanent gas chambers had existed, and with the gas vans inspired his solution. He decided to combine in Belzec the permanent gas chamber with the internal combustion car engine as gas supplier. Wirth objected to the bottles of carbon monoxide gas that had been used in euthanasia institutions. The bottles, which were produced in private factories and which would be supplied to Belzec in large quantities, could arouse suspicion. In addition, the factories were located at great distances from Belzec and the steady supply of the bottles might cause a logistical problem. Wirth preferred to set up a self-contained extermination system, based on an ordinary car engine and easily available gasoline and not dependent on supply by outside factors...
Wirth carried out experiments to determine the most efficient method of handling the transports of Jews from the time of their arrival at the camp until their murder and burial. He developed some basic concepts for the process of extermination and for camp structure. The basic structure of the camp and the various actions the victims were made to do as soon as they left the train were intended to ensure that they would not grasp the fact that they had been brought for extermination. The aim was to give the victims the impression that they had arrived at a labor camp or a transit camp from where they would be sent to a labor camp. The deportees were to believe this until they were closed into the gas chambers camouflaged as baths.

The second principle of the extermination process was that everything should be carried out with the utmost speed. The victims should be rushed, made to run, so that they had no time to look round, to reflect, or to understand what was going on. This also supported the basic principle of deceiving the victims. They should be shocked, and their reactions paralyzed in order to prevent escape or resistance. The speed of the extermination process served yet an additional purpose: it increased the killing capacity of the camp. More transports could be brought and annihilated in one day.

According to Wirth's annihilation scheme, the Jews themselves should carry out all physical work involved in the extermination process of a transport...

Christian Wirth as SS-Sturmbannführer

Fellow SS man Erich Fuchs described his impression of Wirth from his brief interaction with him during Action T4 and at Belzec:

Polizeihauptmann [police captain] Christian Wirth conducted the Aktionen in Bernburg. Subordinate to him were the burners, disinfectors and drivers. He also supervised the transportation of the mentally ill and of the corpses. One day in the winter of 1941 Wirth arranged a transport [of euthanasia personnel] to Poland. I was picked together with about eight or ten other men and transferred to Belzec... I don't remember the names of the others. Upon our arrival in Belzec, we met Friedel Schwarz [sic] and the other SS men, whose names I cannot remember. They supervised the construction of barracks that would serve as a gas chamber. Wirth told us that in Belzec "all the Jews will be struck down." For this purpose barracks were built as gas chambers. I installed shower heads in the gas chambers. The nozzles were not connected to any water pipes; they would serve as camouflage for the gas chamber. For the Jews who were gassed it would seem as if they were being taken to baths and for disinfection.

On 1 August 1942, Globocnik appointed him to the post of Inspector of Aktion Reinhard camps, which would grant Wirth overall command of the Sobibór and Treblinka death camps, as well. Wirth's official title in this capacity was Abteilung Reinhard – Der Inspekteur des SS-Sonderkommandos beim SS- und Polizeiführer Lublin.

Wirth was noted for his unusually brutal rule. He established the regime of terror and death which was carried out in all Operation Reinhard camps more than any other camp commander. During his time at Bełżec, Wirth experimented with different methods to most efficiently deal with prisoners. He developed much of the systematic policy for interaction with the prisoners. For instance, Wirth decided that newly arrived prisoners to be murdered should be beaten with whips incessantly to drive them into the gas chambers, thus creating a sense of panic and terror in which the prisoners felt forced to comply. Such policies were soon implemented at the other death camps.

SS-Unterscharführer (corporal) Franz Suchomel testified about Wirth:

From my activity in the camps of Treblinka and Sobibor, I remember that Wirth in brutality, meanness, and ruthlessness could not be surpassed. We therefore called him 'Christian the Terrible' or 'The Wild Christian'. The Ukrainian guardsmen called him 'Stuka'. The brutality of Wirth was so great that I personally see it as a perversity. I remember particularly that on each occasion, Wirth lashed Ukrainian guardsmen with the whip he always kept...

If only someone had had the courage to kill Christian Wirth – then Aktion Reinhard would have collapsed. Berlin would not have found another man with such energy for evil and nastiness.

During the construction of Sobibór, the second Aktion Reinhard camp, Wirth visited the incomplete site, and conducted an experimental gassing of 25 Jewish slave-labourers. He liked to carry a whip, and he used it on both Jewish victims and guards. When Treblinka (the last and most efficient Reinhard camp) was set up, Wirth took a direct role in reorganizing it when the first Commandant, Dr. Irmfried Eberl, was replaced by Franz Stangl. Stangl recalled one of Wirth's inspection visits to Treblinka as Inspector of Operation Reinhard, around September 1942:

To tell the truth, one did become used to it... they were cargo. I think it started the day I first saw the Totenlager [extermination area] in Treblinka. I remember Wirth standing there, next to the pits full of black-blue corpses. It had nothing to do with humanity – it could not have. It was a mass – a mass of rotting flesh. Wirth said 'What shall we do with this garbage?' I think unconsciously that started me thinking of them as cargo.

In May 1943, after Heinrich Himmler's visit to Sobibór and Treblinka, Wirth was promoted to the rank of SS-Sturmbannführer (major). On 3 November 1943, after the Sobibór uprising, SS and police units shot all of the Jewish labor forces still incarcerated at Trawniki, Poniatowa, and Majdanek concentration camps during Aktion Erntefest ("Operation Harvest Festival"); 42,000 prisoners in all.

When Operation Reinhard was terminated after three million Polish Jews and thousands of Roma were murdered, Wirth was sent to Trieste in Italy along with the other former Aktion Reinhard staff. From autumn 1943, Wirth's role was to oversee the Risiera di San Sabba concentration camp as well as to combat partisans over the border in occupied Yugoslavia. He commanded SS Task Force R, which engaged in antipartisan and anti-Jewish actions in the Trieste-Fiume-Udine area of northern Italy. The Jews of this area were to be concentrated at San Sabba and eventually killed. Upon Wirth's order a crematorium was built at San Sabba.

Allegedly to remove potential future witnesses, their superiors assigned former death camp staff to the most dangerous job they could find: anti-partisan combat. While in prison in 1971, Stangl stated in an interview, "We were an embarrassment to our [superiors]. They wanted to find ways and means to 'incinerate' us."

== Death ==
Wirth was shot and killed on 26 May 1944 by Yugoslav partisans while travelling in an open-topped car near Kozina, Slovenia, on the Istrian Peninsula while on an official trip to Fiume (now Rijeka). He was buried with full military honours in the German Military Cemetery in Opicina, Italy, near Trieste. In 1959, his remains were transferred to the block 15, tomb 716 of the German Military Cemetery at Costermano, near Lake Garda, northern Italy.

== Sources ==
- Bresheeth, Hood and Jansz, The Holocaust for Beginners, Icon Books, 1994, ISBN 1-874166-16-1
- Lucy Dawidowicz, The War Against the Jews, Penguin, 1990, ISBN 0-14-013463-8
- Martin Gilbert, The Holocaust, Fontana, 1990, ISBN 0-00-637194-9
- Laurence Rees, The Holocaust, Penguin/Viking, 2017, ISBN 978-0-241-29700-1
- Gitta Sereny, The German Trauma, Penguin, 2000, ISBN 0-7139-9456-8

Military offices
Preceded by None	Commandant of Bełżec extermination camp December 1941 — August 1942	Succeeded by SS-Hauptsturmführer Gottlieb Hering
Preceded by None	Inspector of Operation Reinhard camps 1 August 1942 — November 1943	Succeeded by None
