= Lesbians in Nazi Germany =

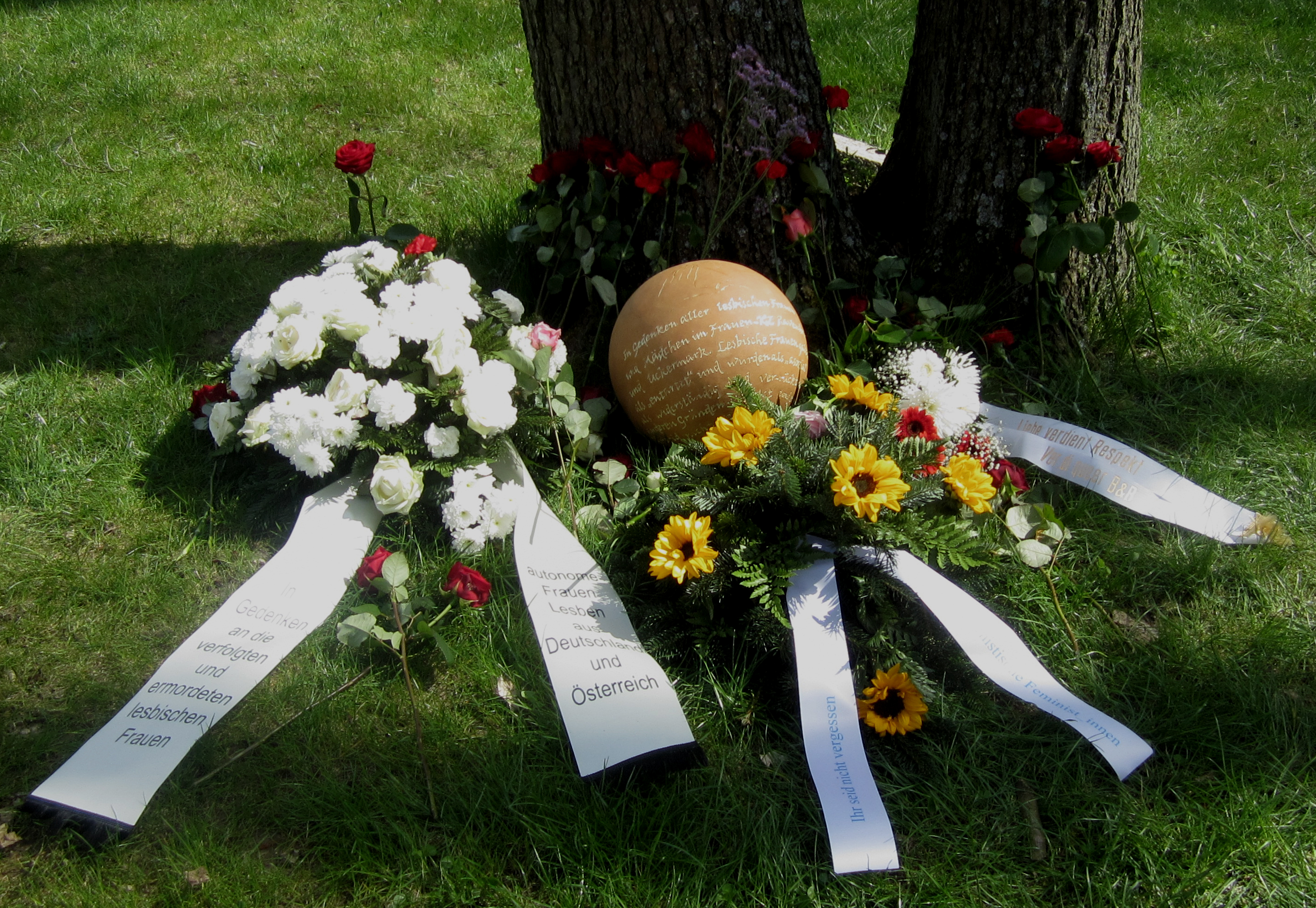
Commemoration of female gay prisoners at Ravensbrück concentration camp by Initiative for Autonomous Feminist Women Lesbians from Germany and Austria, 22 April 2018

In Nazi Germany, gay women who were sent to concentration camps were often categorised as "asocial", if they had not been otherwise targeted based on their ethnicity or political stances. Female homosexuality was criminalised in Austria and other territories, but not in most parts of Nazi Germany. Because of the relative lack of interest of the Nazi state in female homosexuality compared to male homosexuality, there are fewer sources to document the situations of lesbians in Nazi Germany.

== Background ==
In Berlin, homosexual bars and night clubs opened up in the aftermath of the First World War. Notable amongst them was the Mali und Igel, run by entrepreneur Elsa Conrad. Inside the bar was a club called Monbijou des Westens. The club was exclusive and catered for Berlin's female gay intellectual elite; one famous guest was the actress Marlene Dietrich. Each year the club hosted balls with up to 600 women in attendance. A campaign to close all homosexual bars, including female ones, began in March 1933. All homosexual periodicals (such as Die Freundin) and organisations were also targeted for closure.

== Historiography ==
Historians investigating individual cases have come to varying conclusions. Women in Nazi Germany accused of a homosexual relationship faced a different fate depending on their characteristics. Those who were Jewish, black, or politically opposed to the regime faced imprisonment in a concentration camp or death—sentences that in some cases the victims' homosexual identity supported their persecution. In contrast, historian Samuel Clowes Huneke concludes that female gays accused of non-political crimes were not treated differently based on being homosexual, and simply being denounced as gay typically led to a police investigation but no punishment. Therefore, he suggests "heterogenous persecution" as one way that homosexual experiences in Nazi Germany might be described.

Historian Laurie Marhoefer argues that "Though not the subjects of an official state persecution, gender-nonconforming women, transvestites, and women who drew negative attention because of their homosexuality ran a clear, pronounced risk of provoking anxiety in neighbours, acquaintances, and state officials, and that anxiety could, ultimately, inspire the kind of state violence that [Ilse] Totzke suffered"—imprisonment in Ravensbrück concentration camp.

The legal structures varied across the territories that the Nazis controlled. While in Germany there were no laws that criminalised sexual relationships between women, in Austria paragraph 129 of the 1852 penal code did criminalise sexual relationships between women. This continued to be enforced after Anschluss, and in 1939 after the establishment of the Protectorate of Bohemia and Moravia, the Austrian penal code was applied to this territory including paragraph 129. In 1940, a court ruling aligned the Austrian law with the 1935 version of Paragraph 175 of the German Criminal Code, increasing prosecution and criminal penalties.

== Memorials ==
In 2008, there was a controversy over the Memorial to Homosexuals Persecuted Under Nazism in Tiergarten, Berlin about the initial non-inclusion of gay women in the memorial. Critics argued that, while gay women did not face systematic persecution to the same extent as gay men, it was appropriate to memorialise those women who had been sent to concentration camps. A plan to replace the initial video with one that included women faced a backlash from opposing historians, activists, and memorial directors who argued that it would be "falsification" to include gay women. Despite efforts by some gay female activists to commemorate female homosexuals imprisoned and murdered at Ravensbrück, as of 2021 there has not been agreement on the establishment of a gay women's memorial at the camp. Huneke argues that even though homosexual women were not systematically persecuted, it may be appropriate to erect memorials because gay women in Nazi Germany faced violence and discrimination.

== See also ==
- Persecution of homosexuals in Nazi Germany
- Persecution of transgender people in Nazi Germany
- Margot Heuman
- Henny Schermann
- Ovida Delect
- Elsa Conrad
- Mary Pünjer
- Margarete Rosenberg (Holocaust survivor)
- Elli Smula
