= Mary Pünjer =

Jewish lesbian saleswoman and victim of the Holocaust

- Born: Mary Kümmermann; 24 August 1904; Wandsbek
- Died: 28 May 1942 (aged 37); Bernburg Euthanasia Centre
- Cause of death: Gassed to death in Action 14f13
- Citizenship: Germany
- Occupation: Shop assistant
- Known for: As a lesbian who was murdered in the Holocaust
- Parents: Joel Kümmermann (father); Lina Kümmermann, née Korn (mother)

Mary Pünjer (24 August 1904 – 28 May 1942) was a German lesbian Jew, who was murdered in the Bernburg Euthanasia Centre during the Holocaust.

== Life ==
Mary Kümmermann was born on 24 August 1904 in Wandsbek to a Jewish family. After graduating from the Wandsbeker Lyzeum high school in 1922, Mary initially worked as a saleswoman in her parents' women's clothing store. In 1929 she married a schoolfriend, Fritz Pünjer, who was not Jewish. On 24 July 1940, she was arrested and was interned in the Fuhlsbüttel concentration camp in Hamburg for three months. The camp's entry register described her as “anti-social” and, as an addendum - “a very active lesbian”. She also supposedly “exchanged tendernesses” with another woman. The fact that she was Jewish was not included in these records.

In October 1940 Pünjer was transferred to the Ravensbrück concentration camp. On her admission to the concentration camp, “lesbian” was not noted as the main reason, but only as an addition. Between October 1940 and March 1941, Mary Pünjer was interrogated several times by the Hamburg Police Department for Sexual Offenses. On 15 March 1941 she was sent back to Ravensbrück and assigned to the physician and eugenicist Friedrich Mennecke (de). Mennecke had other patients who were lesbian, including Henny Schermann. He was also involved in the Nazi murders of the T4 campaign and the selection of concentration camp prisoners to be murdered in Action 14f13. The timing of Pünjer's repatriation to the camp coincides with the beginning of Action 14f13 in various concentration camps. However, she did not appear on Mennecke's list until his second visit in January 1942.

In 1942 Pünjer was assigned to Action 14f13. On her death warrant it stated that she was a “married Jew” and “actively lesbian”. There are no indications of a disability or illness, rather, her sexual orientation was viewed as an “anti-social act” which the Nazis used to condemn her to death.

Pünjer was murdered on 28 May 1942 in the Bernburg Euthanasia Centre.

== Remembrance ==
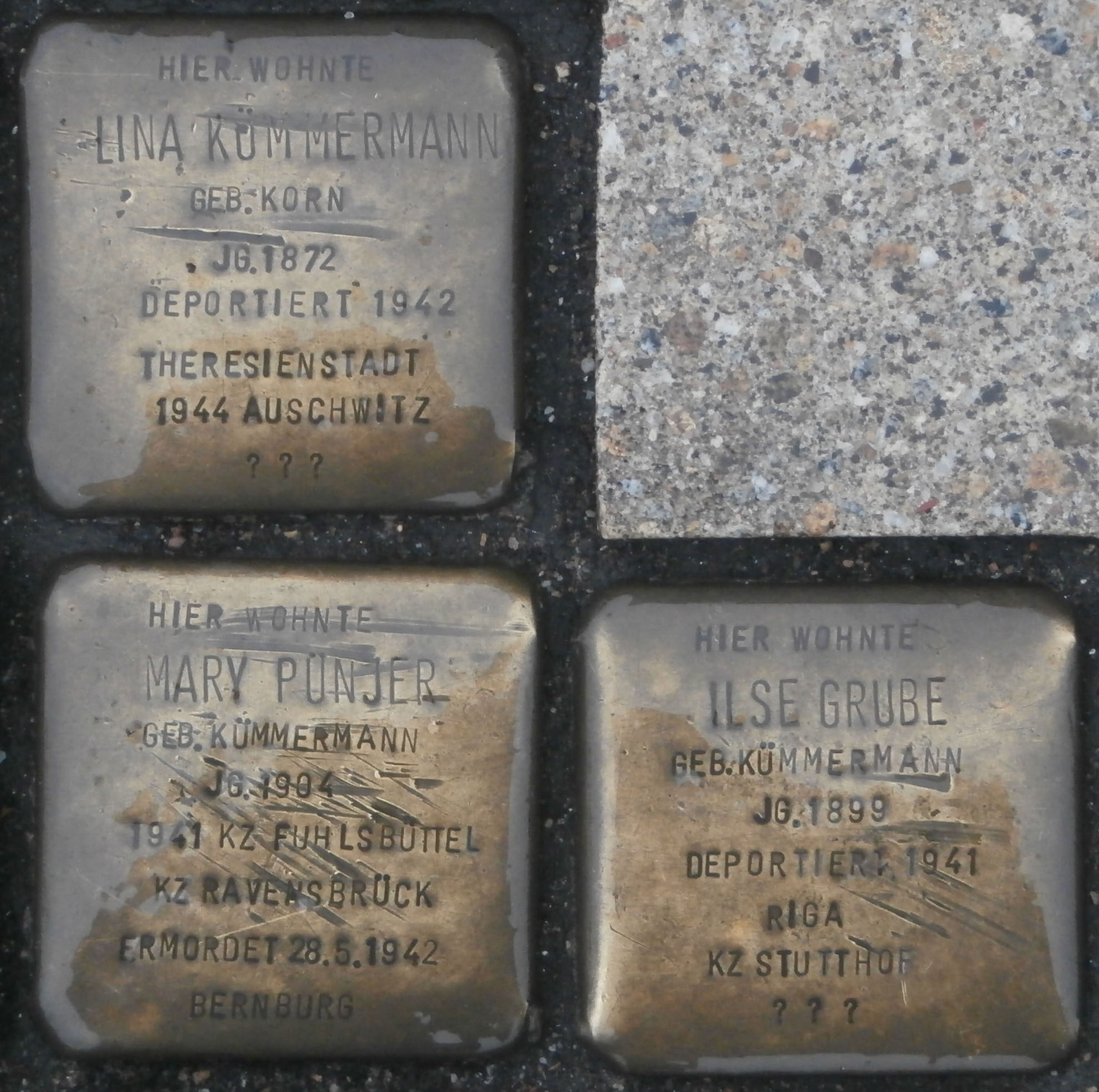
Stolperstein Wandsbeker Marktstraße 57 in Hamburg-Wandsbek

A stolperstein dedicated to Mary Pünjer is in Hamburg-Wandsbek at Wandsbeker Marktstrasse 57.

== Historiography ==
Aside from the allegations made on entry forms by concentration camp attendants, there is no additional evidence about Pünjer's sexuality. The historian Carol Mann wrote that Jewish, lesbian women in prison were generally murdered for their Jewish faith rather than their sexuality, and she gives Mary Pünjer as an example of this. However, Pünjer was not the only lesbian to be murdered at Ravensbrück: Elli Smula and Margarete Rosenberg arrived there on 30 November 1940, identified as lesbians. In some concentration camps brothels were established to punish lesbian women by raping them. Sex with Jewish women was forbidden on grounds of racial disgrace by the Nazis, but rape was not considered a racial disgrace in concentration camps.

== See also ==
- Lesbians in Nazi Germany
