= Bernburg killing centre =

Nazi killing centre in part of mental hospital

Coordinates: 51°47′14″N 11°43′44.5″E

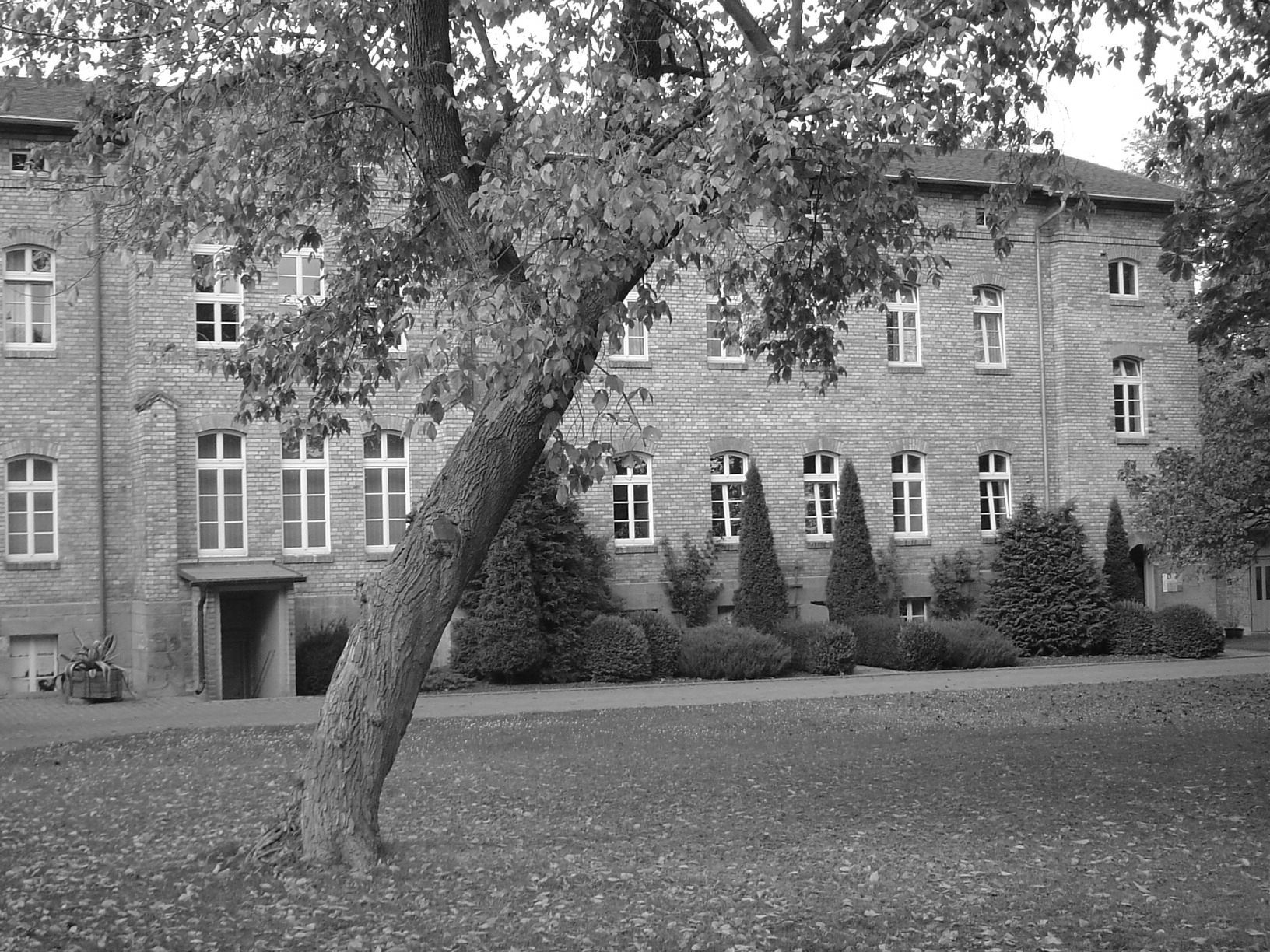
Extermination wing

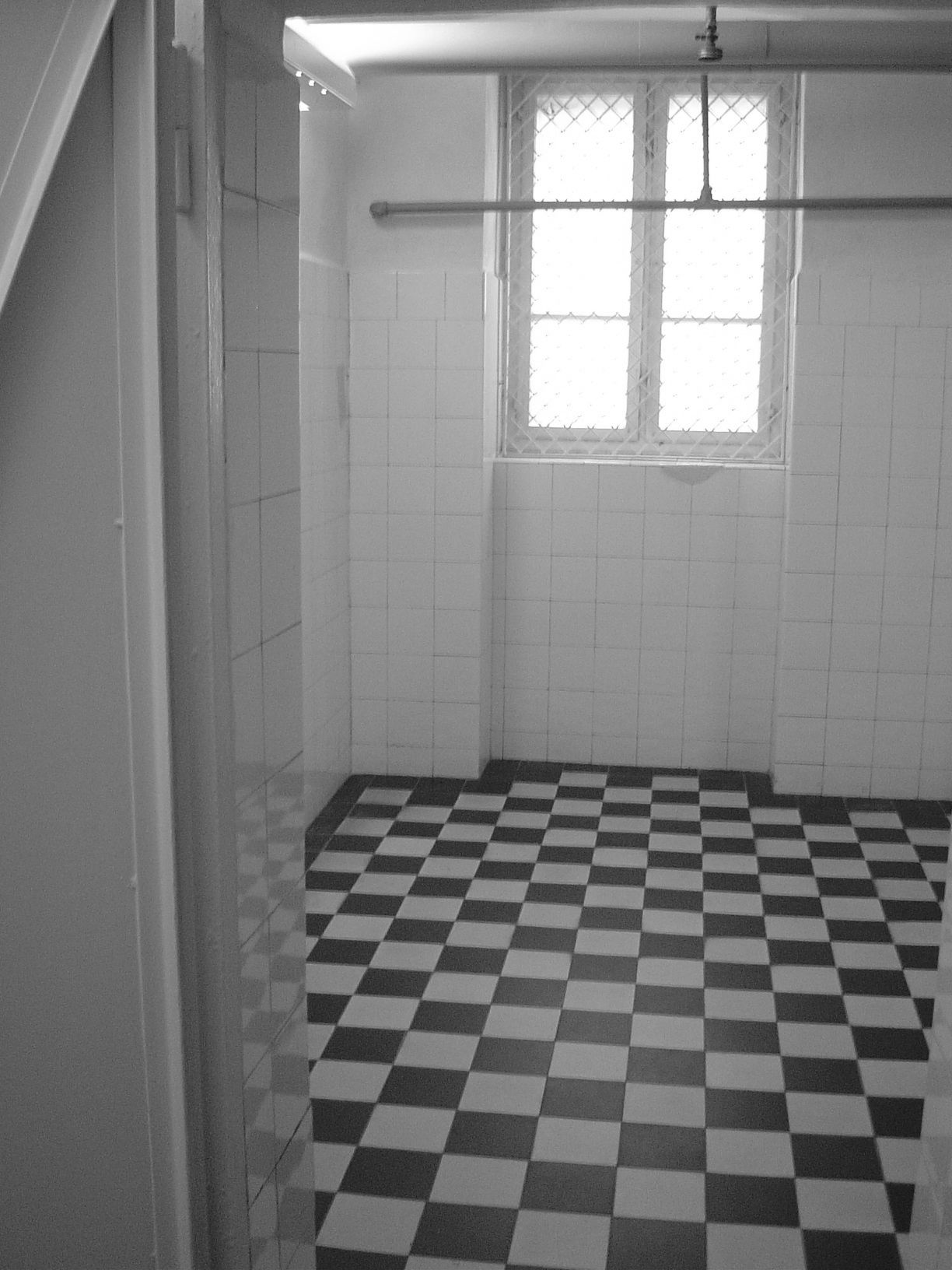
The gas chamber, designed by Erwin Lambert

The Bernburg killing centre (German: NS-Tötungsanstalt Bernburg) was a former psychiatric institute used by the Nazis in the mass-murder of approximately 15,000 people between 21 November 1940 and 30 July 1943. It was located in a separate wing of the State Sanatorium and Mental Hospital (Landes-Heil- und Pflegeanstalt) in Bernburg on the River Saale in the German state of Saxony-Anhalt. It was one of several killing centres run by the Nazis in their larger "involuntary euthanasia" program, referred to after the war as Aktion T4.

A total of 9,384 sick and handicapped people from 33 welfare institutions and nursing homes as well as around 5,000 prisoners from six concentration camps were murdered there in a gas chamber using carbon monoxide gas.

Today there is a memorial in Bernburg commemorating the centre's victims.

The large crematoria furnace where 60-100 bodies were burned every day, was manufactured by H. Kori of Berlin, a company that remained in business until 2012.

== First phase of operation ==
The victims at the killing centre in Bernburg were categorized by their place of origin. According to the organization chart they included: sick and disabled people from institutions in the provinces of Brandenburg, Saxony and Schleswig-Holstein, the states of Anhalt, Brunswick and Mecklenburg as well as the capital city Berlin and the city of Hamburg from where the victims were transported to Bernburg directly or via the intermediate centres which included:

- In the province of Saxony: Jerichow (390), Uchtspringe (county of Stendal) (864), Altscherbitz near Schkeuditz (county of Delitzsch) (1,385)
- In the province of Brandenburg: Görden near Brandenburg (1,110), Neuruppin (1,497) Teupitz, county of Teltow (1,564)
- In the state of Brunswick and others: Königslutter (423)

According to a surviving internal summary, the so-called Hartheim Statistics, 8,601 people were murdered at Bernburg in 1941. These statistics cover only the first phase of the T4 killings that were carried out by Hitler's order of 24 August 1941, and do not include any figures for 1940.

1940	Nov	Dec	1941	Jan	Feb	Mar	Apr	May	Jun	Jul	Aug	1941 Total	1940/41 Total
	397	387		788	939	1,004	1,084	1,316	1,406	1,426	638	8,601	9,384

=== Euthanasia doctors ===
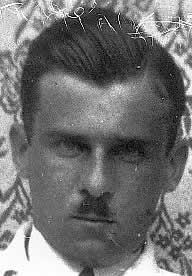
Irmfried Eberl, one of the doctors who administered euthanasia

The organizers of the Nazi Euthanasia Programme, later known as Action T4, Viktor Brack and Karl Brandt, ordered that the killing of patients could only be carried out by clinicians, because the letter of authorization from Hitler dated 1 September 1939 only referred to doctors. The operation of the gas tap was therefore the job of the gas doctors in the extermination centres. Despite that, during the course of the Euthanasia Programme, in the absence of the doctors or for other reasons, the gas tap was also operated by non-medical personnel. In correspondence with the outside world, the doctors employed false names.

The following doctors carried out euthanasia in Bernburg:

- Head: Irmfried Eberl ("Dr. Schneider"): November 1940 to August 1941; transferred from Berlin back to Bernburg, 1942–1943
- Deputy: Heinrich Bunke ("Dr. Keller"): November 1940 to August 1941

=== End of first phase ===
On 31 January 1941, Joseph Goebbels wrote in his diary: "Discussed with Bouhler the question of the silent liquidation of the mentally ill. 40,000 are gone, 60,000 must still go. This is difficult, but necessary work. And it must be done now. Bouhler is the right man to do it." The planned figure of 100,000 victims mentioned here was not achieved according to the Hartheim Statistics and the diary entry is cited as evidence that the programme was prematurely halted.

It is debated whether it was the numerous public protests of senior clergymen and other dignitaries, who made the programme public knowledge, or a fear of disruptive action by other countries that resulted in the order to officially call off the Euthanasia Programme – the so-called "Euthanasia Stop". The historian, Uwe Dietrich Adam, also posed the question early on as to whether the programme was halted because its euthanasia specialists were urgently needed in the extermination camps to where they were soon deployed.

== Action 14f13 ==
Action 14f13 was used to eliminate seriously ill concentration camp inmates or those who, for other reasons, were unable to work; they were referred to as "ballast". Action 14f13 also dealt with Jewish prisoners, regardless of their actual state of health. The programme was prepared, alongside Action T4, in the spring of 1941 when medical commissions visited the concentration camps. In a letter after the cessation of the programme had been ordered, it was announced that Bernburg should "deal in the near term with concentration camp members". By the spring of 1942, 1,400 women from Ravensbrück had been killed in Bernburg.

=== Notable victims ===
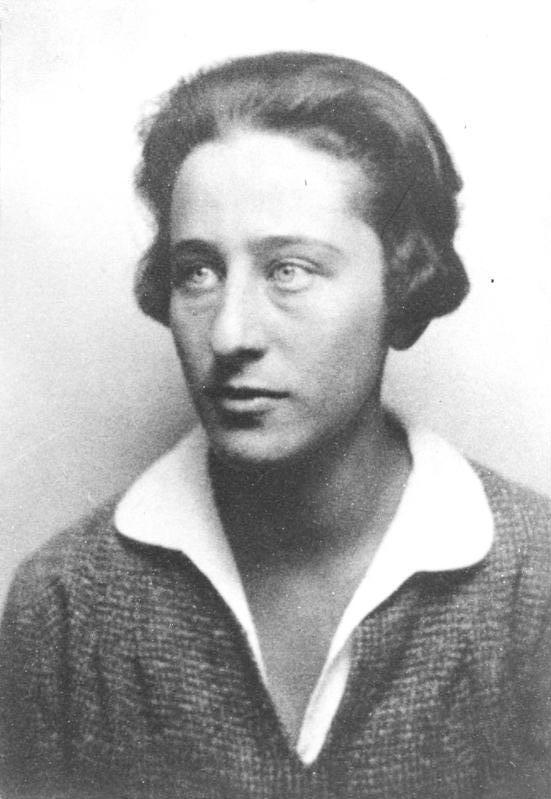
Olga Benário in 1928

- Olga Benário Prestes
- Friedrich Brauner
- Käthe Leichter
- Irma Eckler, wife of August Landmesser
- Ruth Rosa Luise Mühlmann
- Mary Pünjer
- Henny Schermann
- Rosa Manus (Note: There is conflicting information about the location of Manus' death.)

In early June 1942, 300 prisoners from Neuengamme concentration camp were transported to Bernburg and murdered immediately after arrival through the use of carbon monoxide, probably on 5 June 1942. These 300 victims (about 80 German Jewish prisoners and 220 detainees, who had either been arrested as so-called "asocials" or who were seriously ill and unable to work) are all named at the Neuengamme concentration camp memorial site. Their names may be seen in the lists (panels) in the House of Remembrance and Book of the Dead at the former Neuengamme concentration camp (also available in digital form).

== Action Reinhardt ==
Before working in Bernburg SS-Obersturmführer Irmfried Eberl was a doctor and medical head of the Brandenburg killing centre with the same staff. Because of his experience in gassing, from summer 1942 Eberl was appointed commandant of the Treblinka extermination camp as part of the most deadly phase of the Holocaust in Poland known as Action Reinhardt. Irmfried Eberl was appointed the camp's first commandant on 11 July 1942. He was the only physician-in-chief to command an extermination camp during World War II. According to some, his poor organisational skills soon caused the operation of Treblinka to turn disastrous; others point out that the number of transports that were coming in reflected the Nazi high command's wildly unrealistic expectations of Treblinka's ability to "process" these prisoners.

== Post-1945 period ==
In the early years of the GDR, the subject of euthanasia in Bernburg was not addressed. Only in the 1980s did the hospital staff begin slowly to deal with the topic. In the wake of the Wende, a memorial was opened, which was transferred in 1994 to the state. The director of the memorial is Ute Hoffmann. Since 1 January 2007, the memorial has been sponsored by the Memorial Foundation of Saxony-Anhalt. On 29 November 2006, the Friends of the Memorial to the Victims of Nazi Euthanasia in Bernburg was founded on the premises of the memorial.

== See also ==
- Hadamar killing centre
- Hartheim killing centre
