= Elsa Conrad =

Lesbian bar owner and Holocaust survivor

- Elsa Conrad, 13 January 1937
- Born: Elsa Rosenberg; May 9, 1887; Berlin, Kingdom of Prussia, German Empire
- Died: February 23, 1963 (aged 75); Hanau, Hesse, West Germany
- Occupation: Night club entrepreneur

Elsa Conrad, nicknamed "Igel" (9 May 1887 – 19 February 1963) was a German businesswoman and night club entrepreneur. In the 1930s she was arrested and interned at Moringen concentration camp by the Nazi Party and was forced to emigrate, due to her sexuality, political views and Nazi racial laws.

== Biography ==
Born Elsa Rosenberg on 9 May 1887 in Berlin, she was the daughter of a Jewish mother, Bertha Rosenberg (1861–1940), and an otherwise unknown non-Jewish father. She completed a commercial apprenticeship. In 1910 she married Wilhelm Conrad. This marriage ended in divorce in 1931; it may have been a sham marriage and that Wilhelm was homosexual.

After the end of the First World War, Elsa Conrad, nicknamed "Igel" ("hedgehog"), on account of her spiky haircut, managed several businesses that became meeting places for lesbian women. One of them was a bar called Verona-Diele. Conrad met her partner, Amalie "Mali" Rothaug (1890–1984) in around 1927 and they opened a bar together in Berlin-Schoeneberg known as Mali und Igel. Inside the bar, was a club called Monbijou des Westens. The club was exclusive and catered for Berlin's lesbian, intellectual elite; one famous guest was the actress Marlene Dietrich. Each year the club hosted balls with up to 600 women in attendance.

When the Nazis came to power, a campaign against homosexual bars began, which in March 1933 led to the closure of the Mali und Igel and so the Monbijou. Since Conrad was Jewish, her property was confiscated and she had to let a room in her flat to earn a living. She was arrested on 5 October 1935 and imprisoned for 15 months in Berlin for "insulting the Reich government". She had been denounced because of her "non-Aryan" origins, her sexual orientation and anti-state statements. Whilst Conrad was imprisoned, Rothaug ended their relationship.

After her release on 4 January 1937, Conrad was taken into protective custody on 14 January and imprisoned in the Moringen concentration camp. She was told that if she left for Palestine or overseas, she would be released and Conrad agreed. During her internment she was referred to as "the Jew Conrad" by Hugo Krack, the camp director. However, the authorities delayed the provision of a passport, so that the passage on the ship to East Africa that had already been booked for Conrad by her former lover, Berta Stenzel (1892–1979) expired. Conrad was not released until February 1938, with the condition that she leave the country in the same year. On 12 November 1938, she sailed to Tanzania. From 1943 she lived in Nairobi, Kenya, where she ran a milk bar.

Conrad returned to Germany, ill and in poverty, in 1961. She died in Hanau on 19 February 1963.

== Legacy ==
Conrad was mentioned in the autobiographical novel Nirgendwo in Afrika by Stefanie Zweig. The book was adapted into a film Nowhere in Africa and Mechthild Grossmann (de) played a character named “Elsa Konrad”.

== Historiography ==
Historian Laurie Marhoefer used the example of Conrad's life to illustrate how lesbian lives are an under-researched theme of Holocaust Studies.

== See also ==
- Henny Schermann
- Mary Pünjer
- Lesbians in Nazi Germany
