= Margarete Rosenberg (concentration camp survivor) =

Margarete Rosenberg née Quednau (4 August 1910 – 20 March 1985) was a German tram conductor who was arrested in September 1940 in Berlin. She was accused of seriously compromising the Berlin Transport Authority (BVG) by failing to report for work after going out drinking with her female colleagues. Although she admitted to having sexual relationships, she was not accused of lesbianism. Together with her colleague Elli Smula (1914–1943) she was sent to the Ravensbrück Concentration Camp the following November where she was nevertheless listed and treated as a lesbian. She was among those who survived the ordeal, being rescued by the Americans in April 1945 after four and a half years of imprisonment.

== Biography ==
Born on 4 August 1910 in Stettin, Margarete Quednau was brought up in her parents' public house. She left school when she was 14 to help her father as her mother had died in 1912. When she was 21 she moved to Berlin where she worked as a waitress, also becoming a prostitute. In 1935, she married the baker Arthur Rosenberg. They opened a bakery in Berlin-Lichtenberg but had to close it the same year as a result of economic problems. In August 1940, Margarete Rosenberg was employed by the Berlin Transport Authority as a tram conductor in Berlin-Treptow. Not long afterwards, she was accused by the company of having sexual relationships with her female colleagues and failing to turn up at work the following day.

On 15 September 1940, she was arrested and interrogated by the Gestapo. She was taken into custody on the grounds that she had taken female colleagues into her apartment, given them alcoholic drinks and had sexual relationships with them, with the result that they were unable to turn up to work the next day. She and her colleague Elli Smula were both accused of the same crime, namely that they had seriously compromised operations of the Treptow tram services.

Accused of conduct detrimental to the state, they were both transferred to the Ravensbrück Concentration Camp on 30 November 1940. Both were listed as lesbian. During her interrogations, Rosenberg had accused her husband of pimping. In March 1942, she was transferred to Berlin as a witness in her husband's trial. When she claimed under oath that her husband was responsible for her pregnancy, she was accused of perjury and convicted on 25 November 1941. After imprisonment in the Cottbus women's prison, she was returned to Ravensbrück on 12 September 1942 where she performed forced labour for the armaments company Siemens & Halske. In January 1945, she was transferred to the Buchenwald Concentration Camp where she worked in a forced labour team producing armaments at Poltke-Werke in Magdeburg. She was finally freed by the Americans on 13 April 1945 after serving four and a half years in various prisons.

Margarete Rosenberg died in Hamburg on 20 March 1985. She had lived there since the mid-1950s and had married twice more.

== See also ==
- Henny Schermann
- Lesbians in Nazi Germany
