= Eva Mamlok =

Jewish anti-Nazi resistance activist

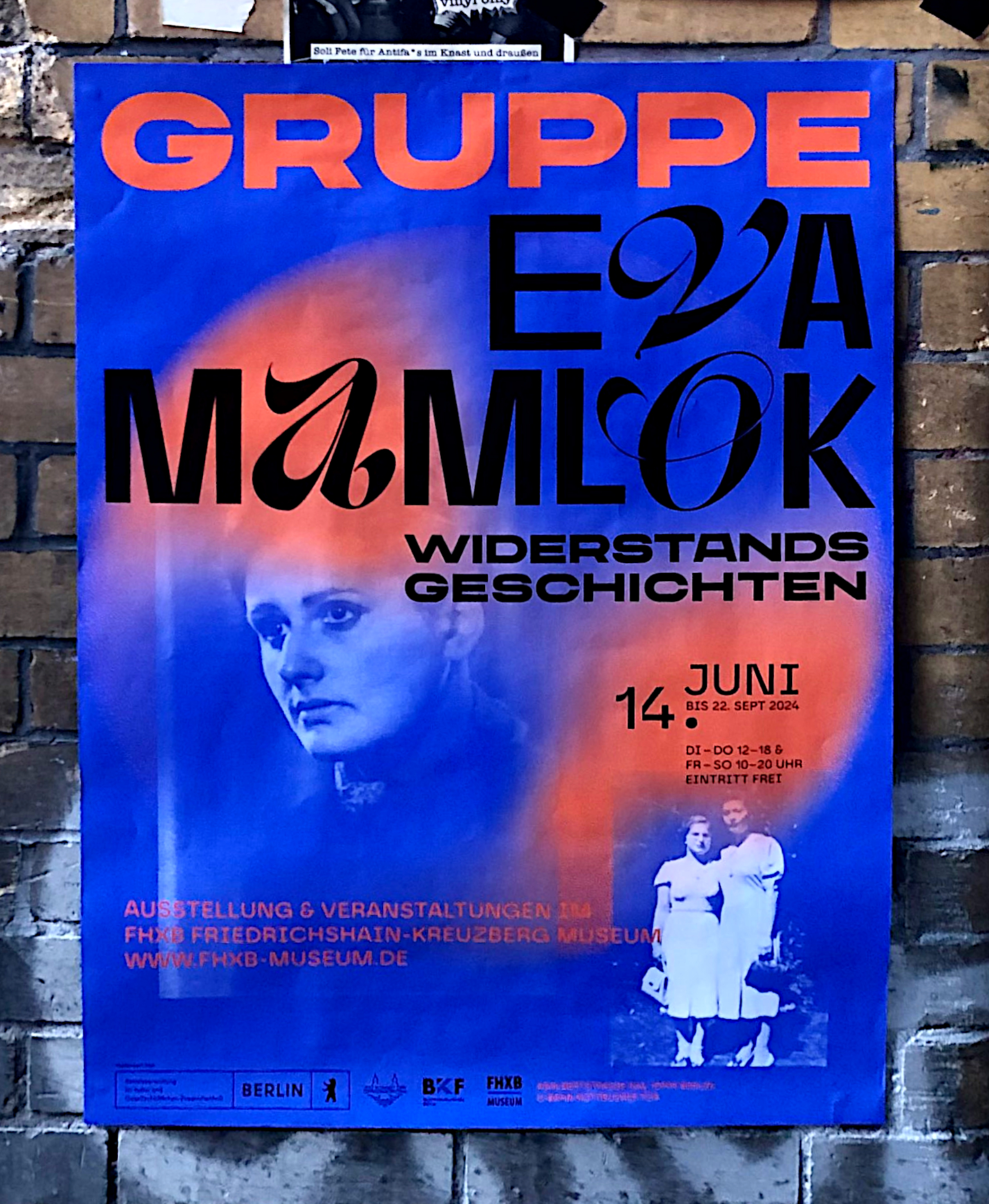
- Portrait of Mamlok on a poster for an exhibition at Friedrichshain-Kreuzberg Museum
- Born: 6 May 1918; Berlin, Kingdom of Prussia, German Empire
- Died: 23 December 1943 (aged 25); Stutthof, Reichsgau Danzig-West Prussia, Nazi Germany
- Monuments: Stolperstein
- Occupation: Domestic worker
- Era: 20th century
- Movement: Anti-Nazism
- Criminal charges: Wehrkraftzersetzung
- Partner: Pieter Siemsen
- Children: Tana
- Parents: Albert Mamlok (father); Martha née Peiser (mother)

Eva Mamlok (6 May 1918 in Berlin – 23 December 1944 in Stutthof concentration camp) was a German anti-fascist and Jewish resistance fighter against National Socialism. At the age of fourteen, she climbed the roof of a Berlin department store and painted "Down with Hitler!" on it. Mamlok was murdered in the Holocaust.

== Life ==
Mamlok was the second daughter of the wine merchant Albert Mamlok (1878–1936) and his wife Martha née Peiser (1884–1942). Her older sister Hildegard (1912–1941) later died of pulmonary tuberculosis while Eva was imprisoned.

=== Resistance and imprisonment as a juvenile ===
Mamlok was fourteen years old when she climbed onto the roof of the Hertie department store near her apartment in 1933 on Belle-Alliance-Platz in Berlin-Kreuzberg. She painted the slogan "Down with Hitler!" on it with white paint. She was arrested but released a few days later because of her young age. In November 1934, she was arrested again when she laid flowers on the graves of Rosa Luxemburg and Karl Liebknecht on November 24, 1934, at the Friedrichsfelde Central Cemetery. The protective custody order issued registered this as "subversive act". Consequently, she was imprisoned in the Moringen concentration camp in Lower Saxony until May 1935. Even after her release, she continued to work against the Nazis. She was most likely the head of an anti-fascist Jewish women and girls group that printed and distributed leaflets.

=== Pieter Siemsen on Eva Mamlok ===
In 1934, through a mutual acquaintance, she met Pieter Siemsen (June 17, 1914, in Osnabrück – May 1, 2004, in Berlin), son of SPD member of the Reichstag August Siemsen, who had already emigrated to Argentina via Switzerland after the Nazis rose to power. She was sixteen, he was twenty. Pieter had been deported from Switzerland back to Germany in 1934 and had to do Reich Labour and military service.

In his autobiography, Siemsen wrote that Mamlok had no political background: "But she was against the Nazis with all her heart and over time also became politically aware." According to other sources, however, Mamlok was a member of the Socialist Workers' Youth (SAJ), which had been dissolved in June 1933. Since then she had been active in anti-Nazi resistance.

Siemsen describes a succinct scene with her:

The two had fallen in love and often went to a cheap eatery near the Berlin Zoo station, known for an audience which "had nothing to do with the Nazis", so the place was probably monitored closely by Gestapo. Siemsen:

There was someone who stared at us impudently the whole time. I wanted to confront him and ask why he was staring at us like that. I was very impulsive, sometimes reckless. Eva said I should be quiet. It was a dangerous situation, she was Jewish, I was in uniform. We couldn't afford a brawl. But I wanted to jump up and approach the man. Then she suddenly smacked me. At that moment I realized the danger we were in. She left, I followed, and we ran away together.

Siemsen was able to leave Germany in 1937 and emigrate to Argentina. Before he left, they bought "wedding rings for 90 pfennigs a pair" from Woolworth's. According to his memoirs, they stayed in touch via letters at least until the outbreak of World War II.

=== Death of father, birth of daughter Tana ===
On November 10, 1936, Mamlok's father Albert died at 58 in the Jewish Hospital at Berlin-Wedding.

At the date of the German Minority Census in May 1939, Mamlok lived with her mother Martha and her sister Hildegard in their parents' apartment at Neuenburger Straße 3 in Kreuzberg. Her mother ran the "Martha Mamlok Wine and Spirits Store" at Neuenburger Strasse 3 until 1940.

On 3 September 1939, Mamlok gave birth to a daughter by the name of Tana, also in the Jewish Hospital, which was among the few places that still gave medical service to Jews. In Tana's birth entry at the Berlin-Wedding registry office, Eva is listed as single mother, occupation 'domestic worker', father of the child unknown. As Siemsen had emigrated in 1937, it could not have been him. From August 1938, only very few first names were allowed for Jewish children, including 'Tana'. According to her colleague Inge Berner, the child's father was not Jewish, but to protect him from the "racial defilement" paragraph of the Nuremberg Laws, Eva stated that the father was a Jew who had emigrated.

=== Forced labor in Berlin ===
From 1939 on, Mamlok had to do forced labor in the factory of F. Butzke Schrauben-Industrie und Fassondreherei GmbH near Moritzplatz. It was here that she met Inge Berner (née Gerson, 1922–2012) in April 1941, who joined Mamlok's resistance group. Berner was later the only survivor of the group. At various occasions, she gave testimony of their activities, as she had been with Mamlok almost until the end of the war. She said that Mamlok was full of energy and a young woman full of life. At the lathe in the factory, she loved to sing the "Threepenny Opera": "She was very beautiful, full of fun, and always singing.".

=== Arrest and deportation to Riga in 1942 ===
In September 1941, Mamlok, Berner and Inge Levinson, another Jewish forced laborer from Butzke's screw factory, were arrested. They had borrowed books banned by the Nazis to a non-Jewish foreman, who was turned in to the Gestapo by another foreman, according to the later testimony of Berner. Moreover, a contact of their resistance group had committed suicide shortly before a planned meeting, and may have left behind incriminating material that the Gestapo found.

The three women were taken to the police prison at Alexanderplatz. Without a proper hearing, they were sentenced to death for Wehrkraftzersetzung. Their sentence was later commuted to concentration camp imprisonment for life. According to Berner, this was achieved through bribery and the intervention of a non-Jewish relative from Berner's family.

While Mamlok was in prison, her sister Hildegard Mamlok died on December 11, 1941, at age 29 from tuberculosis in the apartment at Neuenburger Straße 3.

On January 13, 1942, Mamlok and the two other women were assigned to the 8th "Osttransport" and deported to the Riga Ghetto. Berner managed to stay together with her for long stretches of time. Both were deployed in work details near Riga, in particular the construction site of the airfield at Spilve Airport.

=== Continued resistance work at Riga ===
According to Berner, Mamlok continued to be active in anti-Nazi resistance in Riga. At the construction site of Spilve airfield, Berner (then Inge Gerson) had met a German engineer who agreed to send mail to her aunt in Berlin, who was married to a non-Jew. This aunt (unknowingly) sent a miniature camera baked into a cake from Berlin to Riga: "And Eva, who was with me at the construction site, with some Latvians, she had taken up some connection again with the resistance group. ... She was a very courageous girl. And they told her that my aunt should contact such-and-such, and they would give her a cake and she should send the cake to me. Which she did, not knowing what was with the cake or anything. Well, in the cake was a miniature camera. And Eva gave that to someone, I don't know to whom. But there were pictures taken with it, and some appeared in books, these pictures."

These clandestine photos from Riga could not clearly be identified so far.

=== Deportation of mother and daughter ===
Mamlok's mother Martha was deported from Berlin to Riga as well on October 19, 1942, and murdered there immediately upon arrival on October 22, 1942. With Martha Mamlok on this 21st "Osttransport" of October 19, 1942, 959 people and almost 60 children between 2 and 16 from the Jewish orphanage in Prenzlauer Berg on Schönhauser Allee 162 were deported, including their three carers. Tana Mamlok, Eva's then three-year-old daughter, stayed behind in another Berlin Jewish orphanage after her grandmother's deportation. Her last address before deportation was 4 Alte Schönhauser Straße. After the forced closure of this orphanage, Tana was deported to the extermination camp Auschwitz-Birkenau on 29 November 1942, and murdered. This 23rd "Osttransport" of 29 November 1942, contained 998 people, including 75 children, mostly from the Auerbach Jewish Orphanage, between 10 months and 16 years. It is not known why Tana was deported separately from her grandmother. In the declaration of assets filled out for her, she is referred to as "orphan".

=== Imprisonment and death in Stutthof 1944 ===
On the orders of the Riga Nazi Security Police, Mamlok was taken to the Stutthof concentration camp on 1 October 1944, where she received prisoner number 94020. The reasons for this transfer are not known.

In her 1991 testimony, Berner assumed that Mamlok had died in Spilwe in 1943 of sepsis due to malnutrition, extremely hard work and hygiene deficiencies. Yet according to the official Nazi death certificate, Eva Mamlok died on December 23, 1944, at 8.35 a.m. in Block 21 of the Stutthof concentration camp from "general physical weakness". Only one month later, in January 1945, Berner herself managed to escape from a Stutthof satellite camp together with Charlotte Arpadi.

== Memorial ==
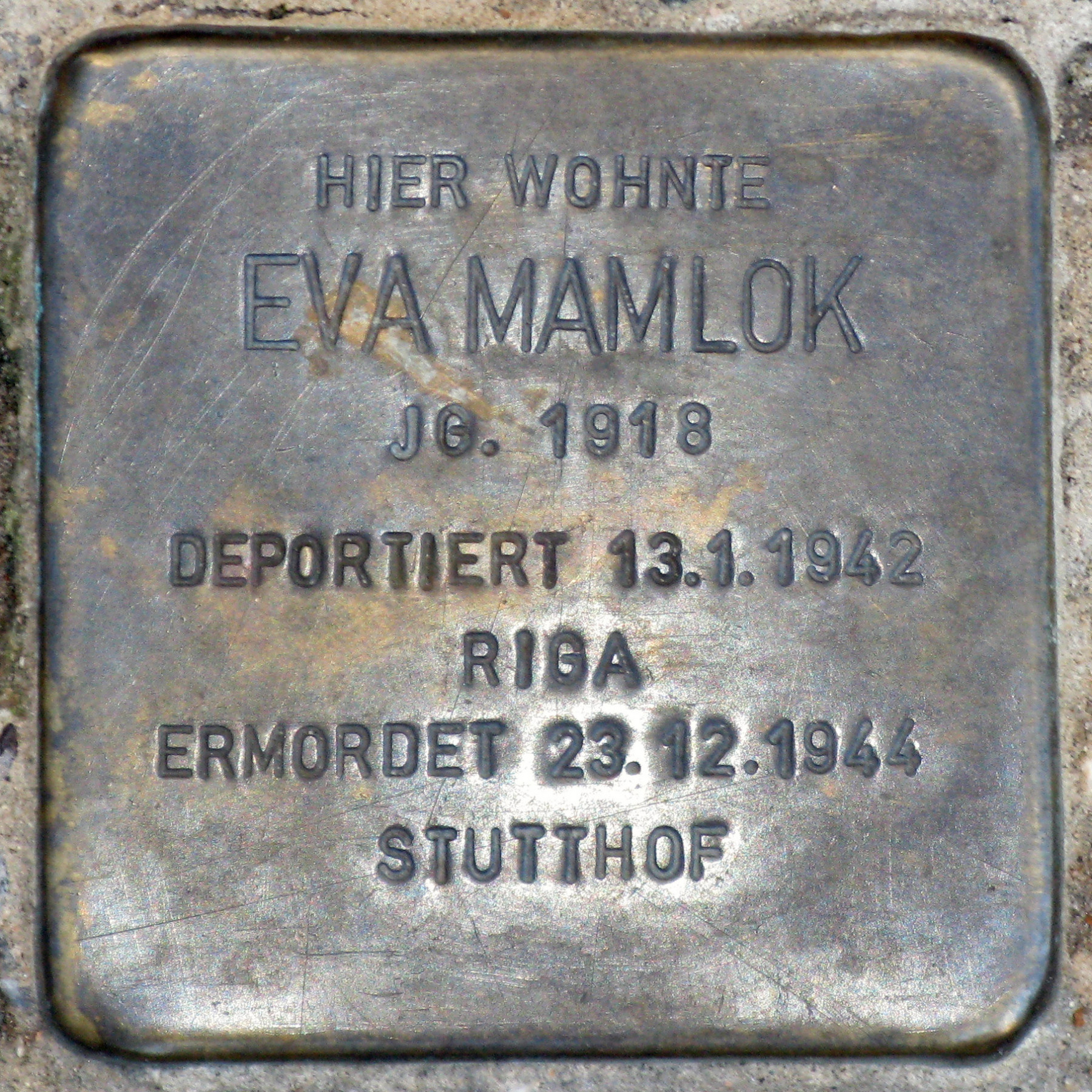
Stolperstein for Mamlok in Berlin-Kreuzberg, at 1 Neuenburger Straße

On 10 October 2011, a Stolperstein for Mamlok was laid in Berlin-Kreuzberg at 1 Neuenburger Straße (formerly 3 Neuenburger Straße).

On May 7, 2026, Mamlok was honored with a special 95-cent postage stamp in the 2026 stamp series of the Federal Republic of Germany, “Women in Resistance Against National Socialism.”

Berlin-Kreuzberg’s Blücherplatz will be renamed Eva-Mamlok-Platz, effective after October 16, 2026, with an information plaque commemorating her life and resistance.

== Literature ==
- Inge Berner, The Death Sentence, in: The Unfinished Road: Jewish Survivors of Latvia Look Back, ed. by Gertrude Schneider, Praeger publishers, 1991, ISBN 978-0-275-94093-5
- Inge Berner, Interview 31206. Visual History Archive, USC Shoah Foundation, 1997. Accessed 20 July 2023.
- Kim Wünschmann, Before Auschwitz. Jewish Prisoners in the Prewar Concentration Camps, Harvard University Press, 2015, ISBN 978-0-674-42558-3
- Jörg Osterloh and Kim Wünschmann, »... der schrankenlosesten Willkür ausgeliefert« Häftlinge der frühen Konzentrationslager 1933-1936/37, Campus, 2017, ISBN 978-3-593-50702-6
- Achim Doerfer, "Irgendjemand musste die Täter ja bestrafen". Die Rache der Juden, das Versagen der deutschen Justiz nach 1945 und das Märchen deutsch-jüdischer Versöhnung, Kiepenheuer & Witsch, 2021, ISBN 978-3-462-31813-5
