= Friedrich Brauner =

Friedrich Brauner (1889 – March 23, 1942) was an Austrian fitter and resistance fighter against the German Nazi Reich. He was deported to the concentration camp Ravensbrück and then murdered at the Bernburg Euthanasia Centre.

== Life and work ==
Brauner was born in Vienna. At work he instigated his colleagues to disobey the orders for air-raid protection and to extort benefits for heavy labour through a strike. He also claimed that World War II was caused ″by the fault of the Germans″. Therefore, in January 1940 he was arrested with the accusation of ″subversive activities″ against the German Reich, interrogated by Gestapo and finally deported to the KZ Ravensbrück. In 1942 Friedrich Brauner was murdered by the Nazis in the so-called Sonderbehandlung program Action 14f13 at Bernburg Euthanasia Centre.

== Sources ==
- Erkennungsdienstliche Kartei der Gestapo Wien (Gestapo records), scientifically processed by the Documentation Centre of Austrian Resistance, with photographs, retrieved February 21, 2015
- Wolfgang Neugebauer: Der österreichische Widerstand 1938-1945, Vienna: Edition Steinbauer 2008, 109
