= Irmfried Eberl =

Nazi doctor and war criminal (1910–1948)

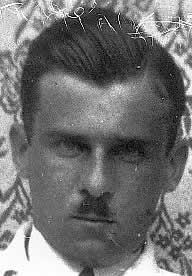
- Eberl in the 1930s
- Born: 8 September 1910; Bregenz, Austria-Hungary
- Died: 16 February 1948 (aged 37); Ulm, Allied-occupied Germany
- Cause of death: Suicide by hanging
- Military career
- Allegiance: Nazi Germany
- Branch: Schutzstaffel
- Service years: 1931–1945
- Rank: SS-Obersturmführer
- Units: SS-Totenkopfverbände
- Commands: Aktion T4, Treblinka, 11 July 1942 – 26 August 1942
- Other work: Psychiatrist

Irmfried Eberl (8 September 1910 – 16 February 1948) was an Austrian psychiatrist and medical director of the euthanasia institutes in Brandenburg and Bernburg, who helped set up and was the first commandant of the Treblinka extermination camp where he worked as SS-Obersturmführer from 11 July 1942 until his dismissal on 26 August 1942. He was arrested after the end of the war in January 1948. Eberl hanged himself the following month to avoid trial.

== Early life ==
Irmfried Eberl was born in Bregenz, Austria on 8 September 1910. He joined the Nazi Party on 8 December 1931 while still a medical student at the University of Innsbruck. Eberl graduated from the medical program in 1933 and gained his doctorate a year later. After February 1935 he served as an assistant physician. Trained and practising as a psychiatrist, he was a firm supporter of the mass murder of people with mental disorders.

== Killing of disabled persons ==
When the Aktion T4 euthanasia program commenced, Eberl was a willing participant. On 1 February 1940, at 29 years old, Eberl became the medical director of the killing facility at Brandenburg. In autumn 1941 he assumed the same position at the Bernburg killing centre. Despite not being formally ordered to take part, psychiatrists such as Eberl were at the center of each stage of justifying, planning and carrying out the mass murder of those with mental disorders, and constituted the connection to the later annihilation of Jews and other "undesirables" in the Holocaust.

== Treblinka death camp ==
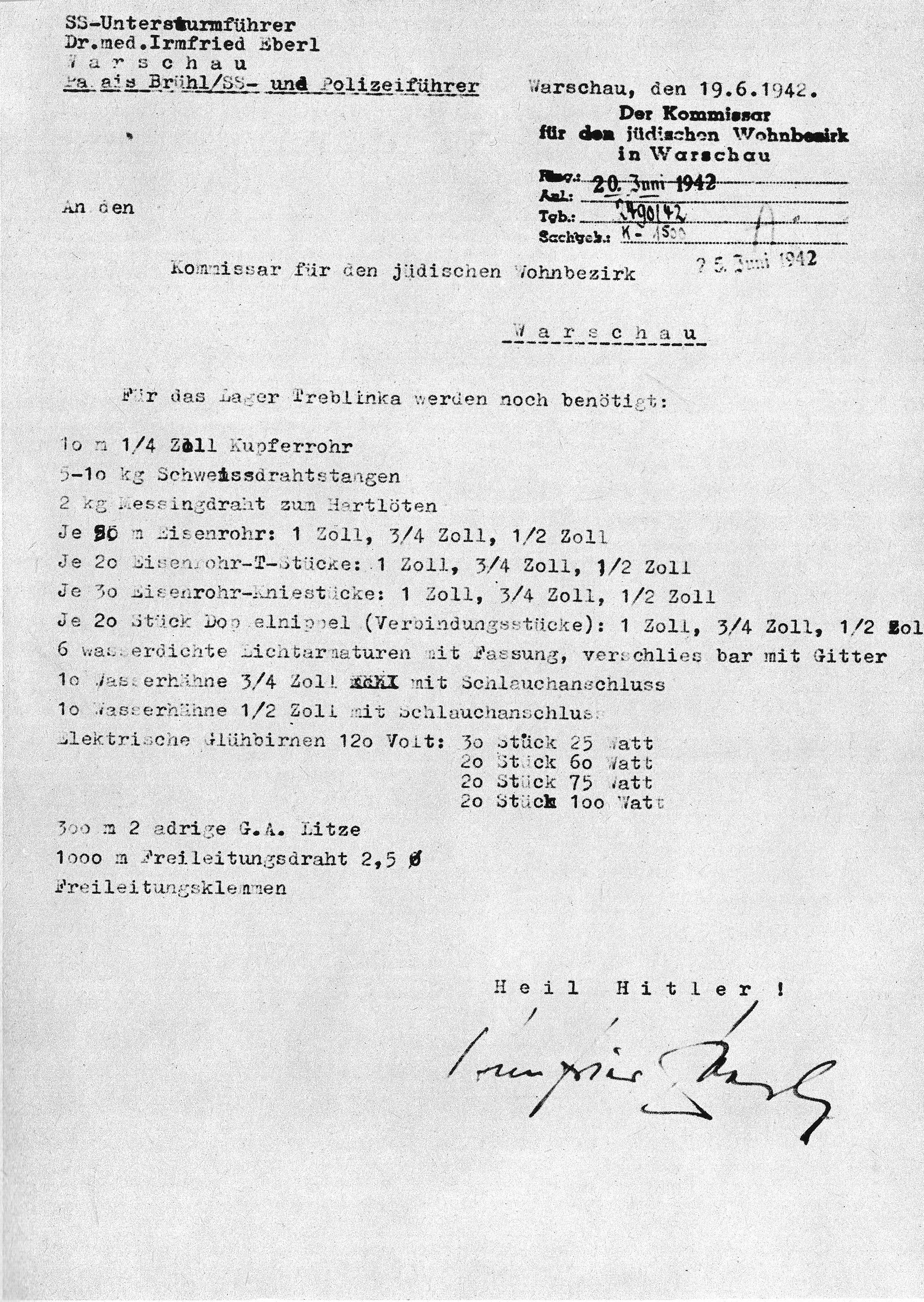
A letter of Irmfried Eberl to the Commissioner of the Warsaw Ghetto Heinz Auerswald dated 19 June 1942 concerning the delivery of materials and equipment for the camp

When public outcry against Action T-4 forced its abandonment in Germany, Eberl found himself out of work. This did not last long, as the Nazi leadership made the decision to use the Action T-4 personnel to murder much larger numbers of people in Poland, using variations of the methods used in the T-4 killings. Eberl was first transferred to Chełmno extermination camp for a brief stint. On 11 July 1942, Eberl was transferred to the command of Treblinka as part of Operation Reinhard. Eberl's poor management of the camp soon proved to be disastrous in the opinion of his colleague Willi Mentz; although historians point out that the number of transports that were coming in also reflected the high command's wildly unrealistic expectations of Treblinka's ability to "process" these prisoners.

SS-Unterscharführer Willi Mentz, an SS officer at Treblinka, testified of Eberl's leadership:

He was very ambitious. It was said that he ordered more transports than could be "processed" in the camp. That meant that trains had to wait outside the camp because the occupants of the previous transport had not yet all been killed. At the time it was very hot and as a result of the long wait inside the transport trains in the intense heat many people died. At that time whole mountains of bodies lay on the platform. Then Hauptsturmführer Christian Wirth came to Treblinka and kicked up a terrific row. And then one day Dr. Eberl was no longer there...

According to SS-Unterscharführer Hans Hingst:

Dr. Eberl's ambition was to reach the highest possible numbers and exceed all the other camps. So many transports arrived that the disembarkation and gassing of the people could no longer be handled.

Eberl was dismissed from Treblinka on 26 August 1942, for incompetence in disposing of the bodies of the thousands of people who had been killed, and was replaced by Franz Stangl, who was previously the commandant of Sobibor extermination camp. Eberl was also relieved of his duty because he was not killing people in an efficient and timely enough manner, and because he was not properly concealing the mass murder from locals. For instance, the stench from decomposition of unburied bodies was such that it could be smelled ten kilometers (six miles) from the camp, such as at the nearby village of Treblinka, Masovian Voivodeship, which in turn would make it self-evident that unnatural numbers of deaths were happening nearby, causing concern among locals. The Nazi leadership wished to avoid any inconveniences to their operations that would result from local outcries. Eberl was apparently part of a ring at the camp that was stealing the possessions of the people whom they had murdered and sending them back to cohorts at Hitler's Chancellery in Berlin. This last activity had been expressly forbidden by Himmler, as he wanted this property to be contributed to the German war effort.

In 1970, Stangl, then in prison for his own crimes, described Treblinka when he first came to the death camp while it was still under Eberl's command:

I drove there, with an SS driver...We could smell it kilometers away. The road ran alongside the railway tracks. As we got nearer Treblinka but still perhaps fifteen, twenty minutes' drive away, we began to see corpses next to the rails, first just two or three, then more and as we drove into what was Treblinka station, there were hundreds of them – just lying there – they'd obviously been there for days, in the heat. In the station was a train full of Jews, some dead, some still alive – it looked as if it had been there for days.
When I entered the camp and got out of the car on the square I stepped knee-deep into money; I didn't know which way to turn, where to go. I waded in notes, currency, precious stones, jewelry, clothes...The smell was indescribable; the hundreds, no, the thousands of bodies everywhere, decomposing, putrefying. Across the square in the woods, just a few hundred yards away on the other side of the barbed-wire fence and all around the perimeter of the camp, there were tents and open fires with groups of Ukrainian guards and girls – whores from Warsaw I found out later – weaving, drunk, dancing, singing, playing music – Dr Eberl, the Kommandant showed me around the camp, there was shooting everywhere...

Eberl was sent back to Bernburg for a short spell afterwards.

== Apprehension and suicide ==
In 1944 he joined the Wehrmacht for the remainder of the war. After the war ended, Eberl continued to practice medicine in Blaubeuren. He found himself a widower when his first wife died in July 1944. In October 1946 he married a second time.

Eberl was arrested in January 1948. He hanged himself in his cell the following month to avoid trial.

== See also ==
- List of people who died by suicide by hanging

Military offices
Preceded by None	Commandant of Treblinka extermination camp 11 July 1942 – 26 August 1942	Succeeded by SS-Obersturmführer Franz Stangl
