= Moringen concentration camp =

Coordinates: 51°42′03″N 9°52′18″E

Three concentration camps operated in succession in Moringen, Lower Saxony, from April 1933 to April 1945. KZ Moringen, established in the centre of the town on site of former 19th century workhouses (German: Landeswerkhäuser), originally housed mostly male political inmates. From November 1933 to March 1938 Moringen housed a women's concentration camp; from June 1940 to April 1945 a juvenile prison. A total of 4,300 people were prisoners of Moringen; an estimated ten percent of them died in the camp.

== Moringen workhouse, 1730s – 1933 ==
History of forced confinement in Moringen goes back to an orphanage established in 1738 or 1732. In 1818 Kingdom of Hanover took over the property for a prison. By 1838 it housed a "police workhouse" for the "depraved and dangerous" men and women – tramps, prostitutes and beggars; by 1885, when Hanover was incorporated into the German Empire, it was renamed "provincial workhouse". In 1890 capacity reached 800 inmates although actual headcount fluctuated with economic conditions and unemployment. A women's wing was set up in 1909. The workhouse operated through the years of the Weimar Republic although the number of inmates shrank to around one hundred and the workhouse itself gradually became a social welfare facility rather than a prison. By the time of Nazi ascension to power, the place provided shelter to around 150 inmates; all Prussian workhouses, hit by the Great Depression, housed around one thousand.

Educator Hugo Krack (born 1888) became head of Moringen workhouse in 1930, managed it until 1954, and was the chief of KZ Moringen in the 1930s.

== Male camp for political opposition, April–November 1933 ==
Arrests of political opposition in the beginning of 1933 and the resulting demand for prison space prompted Hanover administrators to relieve themselves of the costly, under-used Moringen facility. They struck a deal with police and the latter took control of most of Moringen workhouse; former workhouse inmates were confined to a few rooms, sealed off from the main, now "political" facility. This "welfare" section of Moringen facility operated in its original function almost until the end of World War II, providing temporary asylum to people unfit for work.

This "early" concentration camp in Moringen, one of the first established after Nazi ascension to power, was set up in April 1933 for the internment of political opposition, mostly communists and social democrats. It was manned by SA and SS guards, although initially Krack retained control of the whole facility. The SS took full control in July, following a hunger strike in June that was broken by shutting down the water supply and force feeding the prisoners. The camp was governed by a mix of workhouse and prison rules; corporal punishment was prohibited but guards were authorized to shoot escapees on sight.

All prisoners were residents of Lower Saxony (then Province of Hanover). The first ones appeared in Moringen in April 1933, although many were amnestied on May 1, 1933, and prisoner turnover remained high through the summer. According to the agreement between workhouse administration and the police, the capacity was set at three hundred, and was quickly filled up, reaching 394 in October. The camp housed primarily men and a few women in a special "protective custody section for women"; The first female prisoners arrived in Moringen in June, and by August their number reached 26.

== Female camp, October 1933 – March 1938 ==
In October 1933, after another round of negotiation between provincial administration and the Ministry of Interior, Moringen was designated as the sole official concentration camp for women. Male prisoners were gradually moved to other prisons and camps throughout summer and autumn. Some were released, others transported to different camps; the last men from Moringen left for Oranienburg concentration camp in November 1933.

Prussian Gestapo leased the facility from the provincial administration and thus SS assumed formal control over Moringen. However, Hugo Krack retained his managerial position and civilian administration remained responsible for ensuring relatively humane conditions. Life in Moringen was filled not with physical violence and terror but with monotony and depression. Food was "utterly inadequate" but prisoners were allowed to receive money, packages and letters (subject to censorship; the right was collectively revoked as a penalty); they had time, strength and tools to pursue their hobbies of embroidery and sewing and were even permitted to have their personal lockers (subject to searching). They were not issued prison uniforms and did not have to wear identification badges. The few Jewish prisoners were prohibited from communicating with others, but enforcement proved impossible.

Initially, the camp was filled by members of political opposition (German: Schutzhäftlinge, "protective detainees"), predominantly Communists and Jehovah's Witnesses, but by 1936 the system also "detained" members of other "undesirable" social groups. Moringen absorbed labor union activities, women who returned from emigration (since March 1935), prostitutes and those charged with "defamation of the State". Some were delivered in "utter mental collapse" caused by prior interrogations.

The number of women in Moringen was small until the beginning of 1937: 128 in October 1933, 141 in November, 75 in early 1934. Turnover remained high. In January 1937, the population began rising in line with increased repressions against Jehovah's Witnesses and "habitual criminals" and reached 446 in November 1937; 227 of them were Jehovah's Witnesses. Of 676 researched female prisoners of Moringen,

- 310, or 46% were Jehovah's Witnesses from rural Eastern Germany; they were, on average, around 45 years old;
- 22% were Communists;
- 14% were arrested for "derogatory remarks";
- 6%, including survivor Gabriele Herz who wrote memoirs of life in Moringen, were former émigrés;
- 4% were arrested for violation of Nuremberg Laws.

Prisoner groups were not defined clearly, for example, women arrested for performing abortions were labeled "professional criminals" (for accepting pay for an illegal activity), but later the Gestapo reclassified them as "politicals". Others had multiple "faults" behind them, i.e. a particular person was a Jew as well as a lesbian, but was actually arrested for gossiping about Hitler's alleged homosexuality. One lesbian to be interned was bar owner Elsa Conrad.

Every three months Krack reported prisoners' conduct to the Gestapo, collecting information through conversations, interrogations, the guards and his own informants among the prisoners. He defended some prisoners and denied sympathy to others, specifically Jehovah's Witnesses, considering them "orderly" but "unteachable" or "incurable"; however, in February 1937 he recommended release of a Jehovah's Witness, admitting his long-time failure to reform her. Krack also approved and, perhaps, prompted compulsory sterilization of prisoners.

Himmler was not involved in Moringen affairs until his personal visit in May 1937. He initiated a review of women's camps, and in October 1937 made a decision to close Moringen and relocate its prisoners. Shipments to a larger and "incomparably worse" Lichtenburg concentration camp near Torgau (a former male camp established in 1933) began as soon as it was converted to a women's camp in December 1937; later, many Lichtenburg prisoners ended up and perished in Ravensbrück (built in 1939). Of 127 thousand Ravensbrück prisoners, only 30 thousand survived. Krack apparently defended prostitutes and "asocials" from transfer to Lichtenburg, believing that they (unlike political and religious prisoners) belong in the workhouse rather than in the concentration camps. After the first shipments to Lichtenburg the share of Jehovah's Witnesses rose to 89% in December 1937 (249 of 280 prisoners).

In March 1938 Moringen concentration camp was closed; up to 1,350 women had been its prisoners in 1933–1938. The number, for lack of comprehensive records, has been reconstructed based on turnover and average population; only 856 names were identified. Discrepancies in numbers also arise from separate and confusing recordkeeping for the inmates of concentration camp (SS) and the workhouse (Krack).

== Juvenile camp, June 1940 – April 1945 ==
In March 1940 Himmler, concerned about rising juvenile delinquency, proposed a new system of "youth custody"; in autumn 1940 it was furthered by the Ministry of Defence. In June 1940 Moringen was repopulated again, this time as a juvenile concentration camp (German: Jugendschutzlager), housing male prisoners from 13 to 22 years of age. Punishable activities ranged from true crime to jazz music; the Swing Kids from Hamburg, in particular, were subject to mass arrests as of June 1942; between 40 and 70 of them ended in concentration camps, including Moringen. One of these kids, Heinz Lord, later survived the sinking of Cap Arcona, emigrated to the United States and became Secretary-General of World Medical Association; he died at the age of 43 of heart failure linked to his captivity and torture.

Camp commander, SS Sturmbannführer Karl Dieter reported to RSHA Reichskriminalpolizeiamt and supervised a force of 85 SS guards. The complete system of "youth custody" was created by Himmler in 1943 and 1944. Other camps set up according to the same model were Uckermark concentration camp for girls and young women (near Ravensbrück); Polen-Jugendverwahrlager Litzmannstadt in Łódź for Polish youths (established 1942 to prevent mixing of Poles and Germans in the same camps), where approximately 500 died; Weissensee (Berlin) (September 1943) and Volpriehausen (July 1944).

Moringen became the first juvenile camp where prisoners were assigned to barracks based on their biological characteristics according to Robert Ritter's theory of racial hygiene. The barracks or huts were carefully designed to fit into Ritter's "criminally-biological" scheme of things. Prisoners could hope to be released provided that they progress through the system until reaching the Block der Erziehungsfähigen – a barrack for those "ready for discharge", usually to military service. By October 1943, the first batch was released, 26 of 276 prisoners, including five to Reichsarbeitsdienst. Those who did not "progress" sufficiently to the authorities' satisfaction were relegated to the barracks for "nuisances" and "the incapable". Most were sterilized and sent to "ordinary" concentration camps on their eighteenth birthday.

Himmler's system ultimately failed to produce the desired deterrent effect, and "asocial-criminal rather than political-opposition" (in Himmler's words) youth "cliques" or gangs continued to spread. By the time the Allies liberated the camp on April 9, 1945, an estimated 1,400 boys had passed through the camp. The exact number of deaths remains unknown, but 56 are known to have died inside the camp.

== Later events ==
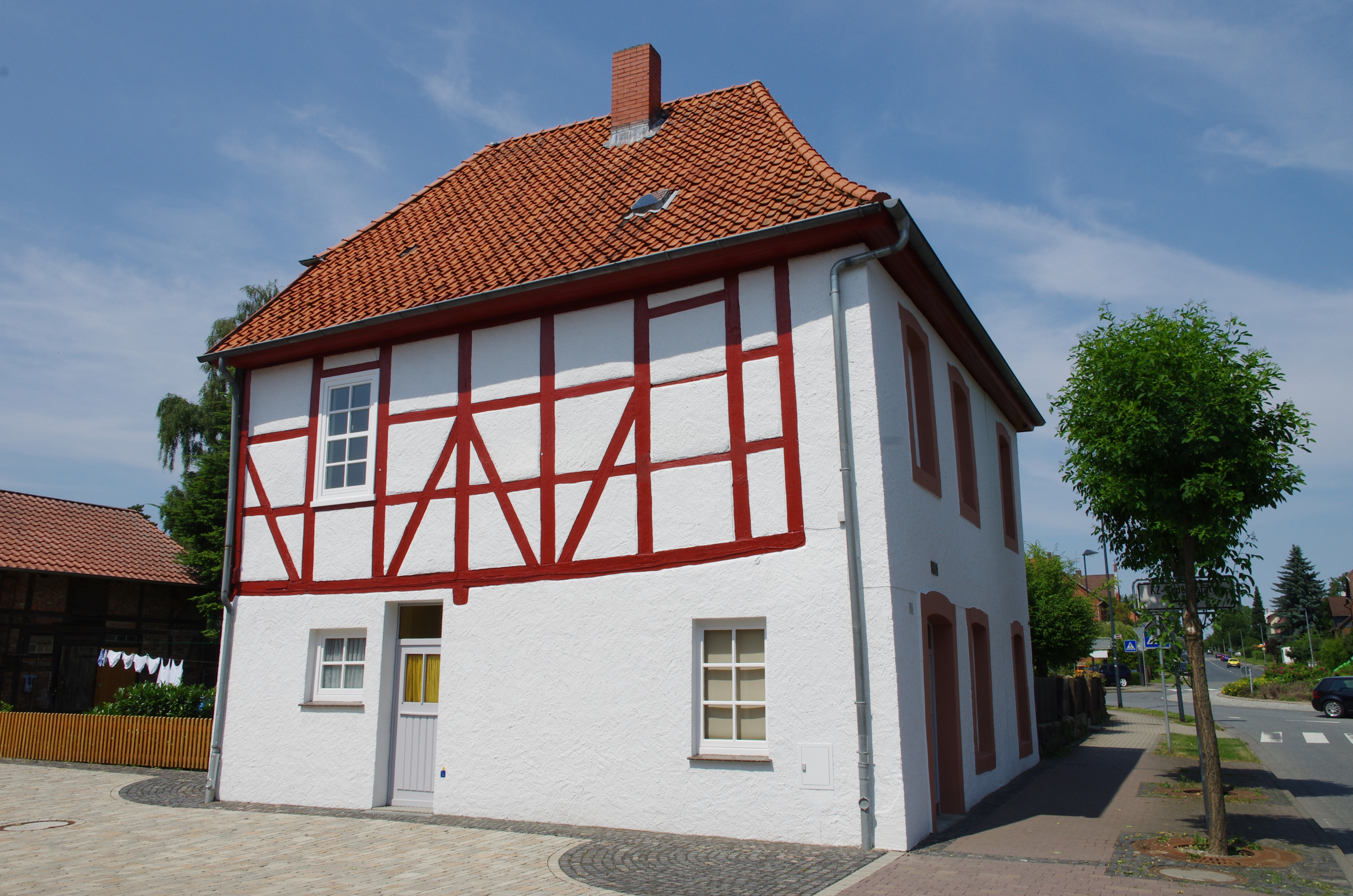
Memorial house in Moringen city

In 1945 Moringen site was reused as a displaced persons camp for Polish people, and in 1948 again became a provincial workhouse. Today there is a holocaust memorial house (KZ-Gedenkstätte) in Moringen. Established in 1993, it shows a permanent exhibition.

== See also ==
- Category:Moringen concentration camp survivors
- List of Nazi-German concentration camps
- Persecution of Jehovah's Witnesses in Nazi Germany
- Women's rights in Nazi Germany
- Nazi eugenics
- Compulsory sterilization
- Reichstag Fire Decree
- Elsa Conrad
- Eva Mamlok, juvenile inmate in 1935

== Sources ==
- Burleigh, Michael; Wippermann, Wolfgang (1991). The racial state: Germany, 1933-1945. Cambridge University Press. p. 224. ISBN 978-0-521-39802-2. "Moringen concentration camp."
- Harder, Jurgen; Hesse, Hans (2001). "Female Jehovah's Witnesses in Moringen Women's Concentration camp". In Hesse, Hans (ed.). Persecution and resistance of Jehovah's Witnesses during the Nazi regime, 1933-1945. Berghahn Books. ISBN 978-3-86108-750-2.
- Herz, Gabriele; Caplan, Jane; Hartig, Howard (2006). The women's camp in Moringen: a memoir of imprisonment in Germany, 1936-1937. Berghahn Books. ISBN 978-1-84545-077-9.
- Kater, Michael H. (2003). Different Drummers: Jazz in the Culture of Nazi Germany. Oxford University Press US. ISBN 978-0-19-516553-1.
