= Hans Hingst =

German SS officer

Not to be mistaken with Hans Christian Hingst, the SS Regional Commissar of Vilna during World War II.

Unterscharführer Hans Hingst or August Hingst (sources vary) served as an SS guard with the rank of first sergeant at the Treblinka extermination camp north-east of Warsaw during the Holocaust in Poland.

== Operation Reinhard ==
Hingst served at Treblinka from the very first period of the mass killing operations under SS-Obersturmführer Irmfried Eberl from Austria. He participated in the murder of 245,000 Jews from the Polish capital, gassed there between 23 July and 28 August, followed by 51,000 Jews from the Radom district, and 16,500 from the district of Lublin, totalling 312,500 dead.

== See also ==
- Operation Reinhard
