= Margot Heuman =

German-born American Holocaust survivor (1928–2022)

- Born: Margot Cecile Heumann; February 17, 1928; Hellenthal, Rhineland, Prussia, German Reich
- Died: May 11, 2022 (aged 94); Pima County, Arizona, U.S.
- Known for: Surviving the Holocaust

Margot Cecile Heumann (pronounced [hɔʏman] HOY-man; February 17, 1928 – May 11, 2022) was a German-born American Holocaust survivor. As a lesbian, she was the first queer Jewish woman known to have survived Nazi concentration camps.

When Heuman was ten years old, she and her younger sister were expelled from public school for being Jewish. In 1942, the Heumanns were sent to Theresienstadt Ghetto. In her youth home in the ghetto, Heuman met an Austrian girl named Ditha Neumann, and the two began a secret intimate relationship. In 1943 or 1944, both the Heumann family and Neumann were taken to Auschwitz. Heuman chose to participate in the selection for forced labor to stay with Neumann. As a result, she did not see her parents or sister again; all three died in the concentration camps.

The group of women selected for forced labor were taken to Dessauer Ufer and later Neugraben and Tiefstack, all subcamps of Neuengamme concentration camp in the city of Hamburg. In April 1945, the Schutzstaffel shut down Neuengamme and the Jewish women were sent to Bergen-Belsen concentration camp. On April 15, 1945, Heuman was freed from Bergen-Belsen concentration camp by British soldiers. After spending two years in Sweden and attending school, she moved to the United States, where she chose to stay because she was able to live openly as a lesbian. She worked for an advertising agency in New York City, and in the early 1950s was in a relationship with New Yorker editor Lu Burke. She later married a male colleague from another advertising agency to have children. After having an affair with another married woman, she left her husband in the 1970s. She later moved to the Southwestern United States and came out to her family as a lesbian.

Heuman's life story was censored by multiple Holocaust-related archives, which initially described Neumann as her best friend rather than her romantic partner despite her frank discussion of their relationship. Interviews with historian Anna Hájková, however, included details of Heuman's sexuality; in June 2021, a documentary play titled The Amazing Life of Margot Heuman premiered based on Hájková's interviews. Heuman died in Arizona in 2022.

== Life ==
Margot Cecile Heumann was born on February 17, 1928, in Hellenthal, German Reich, close to the border of Belgium. She lived above a general store that her parents Carl Heumann (Note: This name is also spelled "Karl" by some sources.) and Johanna Falkenstein Heumann owned and ran, and her grandfather lived across the street. When Heumann was four years old, her family moved to Lippstadt, where she learned to swim in the Lippe. She had a younger sister named Lore Heumann.

=== Nazi persecution ===
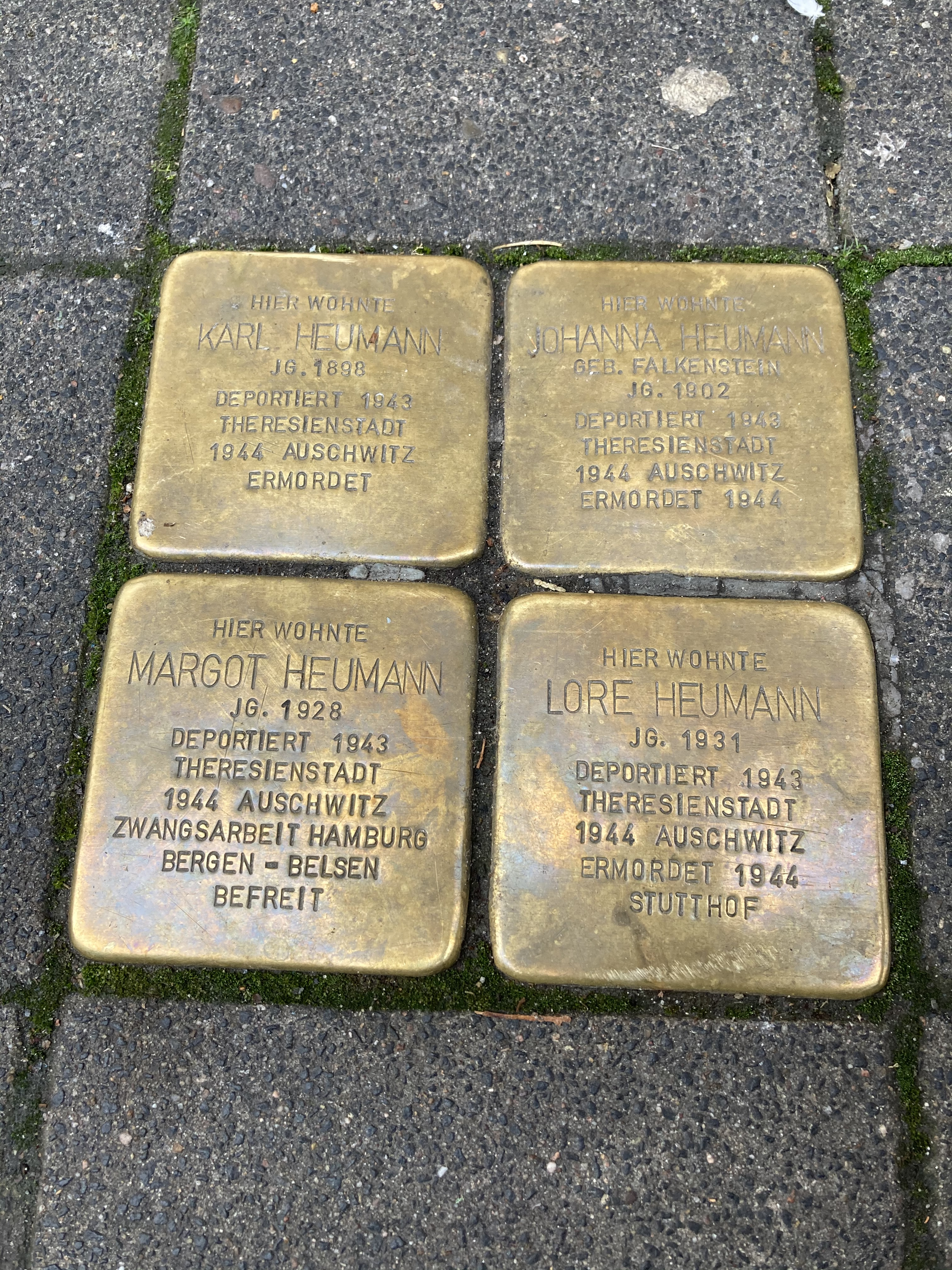
Stolpersteine for the Heumann family in Bielefeld, October 2020

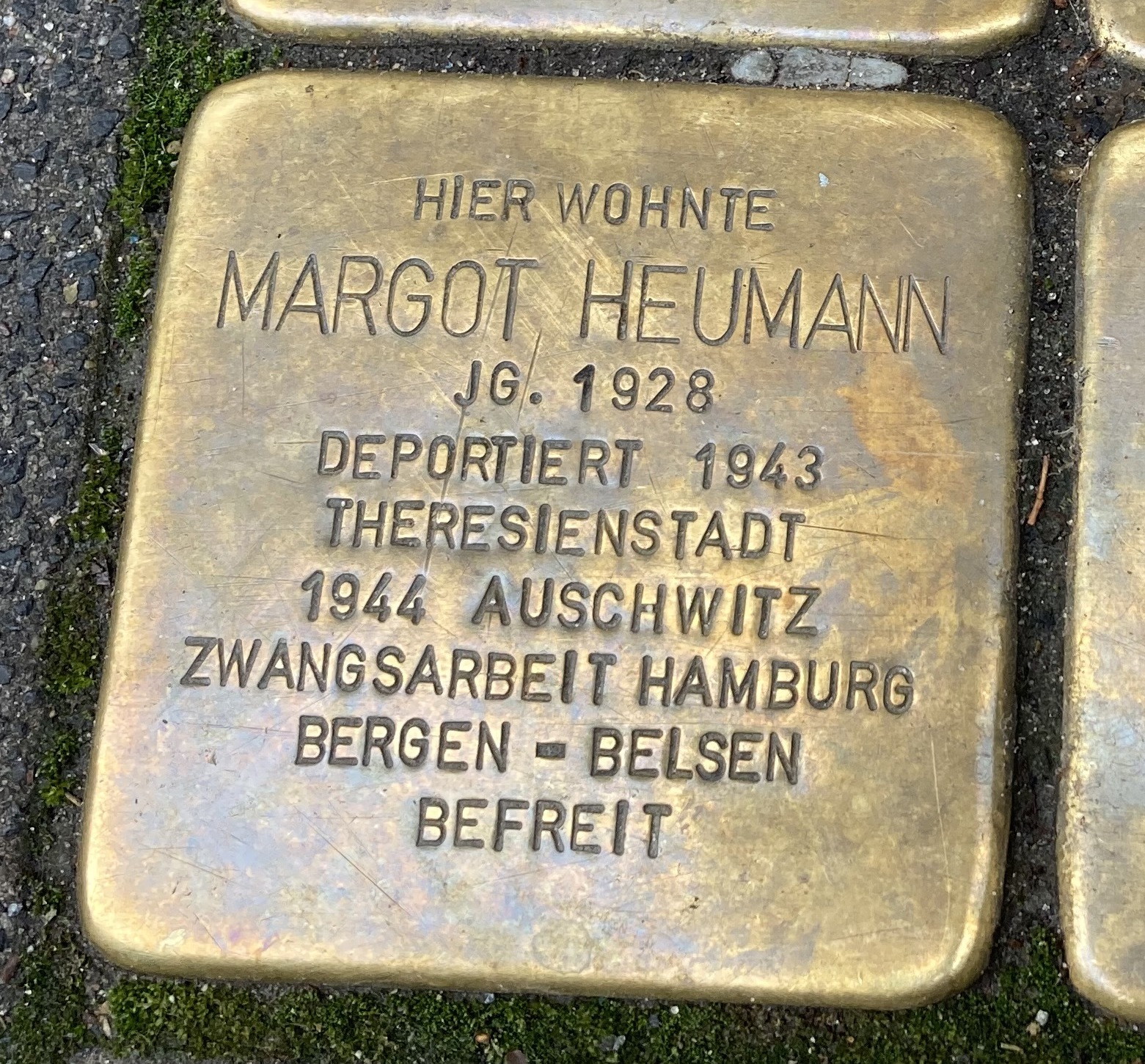
Detail from above image of Stolperstein for Margot Heuman

When Heumann was nine years old, her family moved again to Bielefeld and enrolled her in public school. Her father worked for the Aid Association of German Jews. A year later, she and her younger sister were expelled from school without warning. Their parents enrolled them in a Jewish school, where they had teachers who had been fired from schools by the Nazis. As a child Heumann knew she was attracted to women.

In 1942, most Jews in Bielefeld were deported to extermination camps, but the Heumanns were sent to Theresienstadt Ghetto in June of that year or in 1943 because Carl Heumann worked for a Jewish organization. Children in Theresienstadt were placed in youth homes where they received better food and accommodations than others in the ghetto. Margot and her sister Lore were sent to separate homes. Margot met an Austrian girl named Ditha Neumann (Note: This name is also spelled "Dita" by some sources.) in the youth home, and the two slept together and were intimate but did not have sex. They kept their relationship secret.

In May 1943 or 1944, the Heumann family was transported to Auschwitz after Karl Heumann was caught stealing food. Neumann and her aunt arrived a few days later. Heumann's parents did not attempt the selection for forced labor because her younger sister would not have been able to pass, but Neumann and her aunt did, and Heumann chose to follow Neumann. The group of about 200 women who passed were transported by train from Auschwitz to Neuengamme concentration camp. Heumann's father died at Auschwitz while her mother and sister are believed to have been murdered at Auschwitz or died at Stutthof concentration camp. She did not see any of them again after leaving Auschwitz.

The group of Jewish women were deported to the German city of Hamburg, where they were forced to build shelters for German civilians and clean up rubble. The group, including Heumann and Neumann who were 16 years old at the time, were the first female prisoners to arrive in subcamps of Neuengamme. First they stayed in Dessauer Ufer from July to September 1944, then in Neugraben from September 1944 to February 1945, and Tiefstack from February to April 1945. Heumann and Neumann slept together in a bed at the end of their group's barracks, which disturbed some others, but Neumann's aunt defended the couple on the grounds that they were still children. Both Heumann and Neumann engaged in sexual barter with men while at Neuengamme, obtaining food which they then shared with each other. At the beginning of April 1945, the Schutzstaffel shut down Neuengamme and the Jewish women were sent to Bergen-Belsen concentration camp. Heumann walked the 100 kilometres (62 mi) from Neuengamme to Bergen-Belsen in two days with no shoes.

=== Later life ===
Heumann was freed from Bergen-Belsen concentration camp on April 15, 1945, by British soldiers. She had typhus and weighed only 35 kilograms (77 lb) at a height of 1.67 metres (5.5 ft). She was hospitalized for two months, after which the Swedish Red Cross brought her to Sweden to recover while Neumann stayed behind. Heumann remained in Sweden, where she lived with a schoolteacher and attended school. In 1947 she moved to New York City at the urging of her maternal uncle who wanted to gather the family together; she only intended to live in the United States for a year, but stayed because she was able to live as a lesbian. Upon moving to the United States, she changed the spelling of her last name to "Heuman". In New York she worked as a nanny and a waitress, also holding a job in a button factory. She began a romantic relationship with Lu Burke, who later became a New Yorker copyeditor; the two lived together in the West Village. In the early 1950s, the two were sometimes seen visiting lesbian bars in Greenwich Village together, and Burke read the dictionary with Heuman to help her improve her English.

Heuman attended the City College of New York, and in the early 1950s entered a job at Doyle Dane Bernbach. She continued working for the advertising firm until her retirement. In 1953 she broke up with Burke because she wanted to have children, feeling it was an obligation to her parents, and knew she would need to marry a man to do so. She married accountant Charles Mendelson in 1952 and had two children, whom she did not raise religious. Eventually she reentered her career in advertising after hiring a black housekeeper, while also having an affair with a married woman who lived next door.

In the 1970s, Heuman's husband was addicted to gambling and began abusing her, so she left him through a divorce in 1976. Later, at the age of 88, Heuman moved to the Southwestern United States and came out to her family as a lesbian; her coming out did not surprise them.

Heuman suffered from severe depression and went to a psychiatrist for years after the Holocaust. In 2018, historian Anna Hájková visited her home and conducted an interview in which Heuman described her relationship with Neumann as a romantic one. (Note: The New York Times states that this is the first time Heuman described the relationship in this way, contradicting Hájková's assertion that similar characterizations in previous statements by Heuman had been censored by Holocaust archives.) She visited the Neuengamme Concentration Camp Memorial in 2019, where she was interviewed by schoolchildren. As of May 2020, she was 92 years old and living in Green Valley in the Arizona desert with her dog. She died at age 94 on May 11, 2022, in a Green Valley hospital.

== Historical significance ==
Margot Heuman was the first known woman to have survived the Nazi concentration camps despite being both Jewish and queer. Although she openly discussed her sexuality in several interviews for archives about the Holocaust, those archives kept it hidden, instead describing Neumann as her best friend. In an article about Heuman in Der Tagesspiegel, historian Anna Hájková wrote that it was "tragic that homophobic prejudice prevented a number of queer Jewish women who survived concentration camps from leaving testimonies of their lives", arguing that Heuman's story was even more important because of that fact. (Note: Original quote in German: "Es ist tragisch, dass homophobe Vorurteile verhindert haben, dass etliche queere jüdische Frauen, die KZs überlebten, Zeugnisse ihres Leben hinterließen. Auch deswegen sollten wir Margots Geschichte aufmerksam zuhören.")

== The Amazing Life of Margot Heuman ==
Poster for The Amazing Life of Margot Heuman

A documentary play titled The Amazing Life of Margot Heuman, based on Anna Hájková's interviews with Heuman, premiered in an online performance during Brighton Fringe in June 2021. Directed by Erika Hughes, the one-act play included Hájková and Heuman as characters. Hájková was depicted by an actor at her age, while the actor playing Heuman was in her early twenties, close to Heuman's age during the Holocaust. The characters break the fourth wall during the play.

== See also ==
- Lesbians in Nazi Germany
