= Elli Smula =

German tram conductor and Holocaust victim (1914–1943)

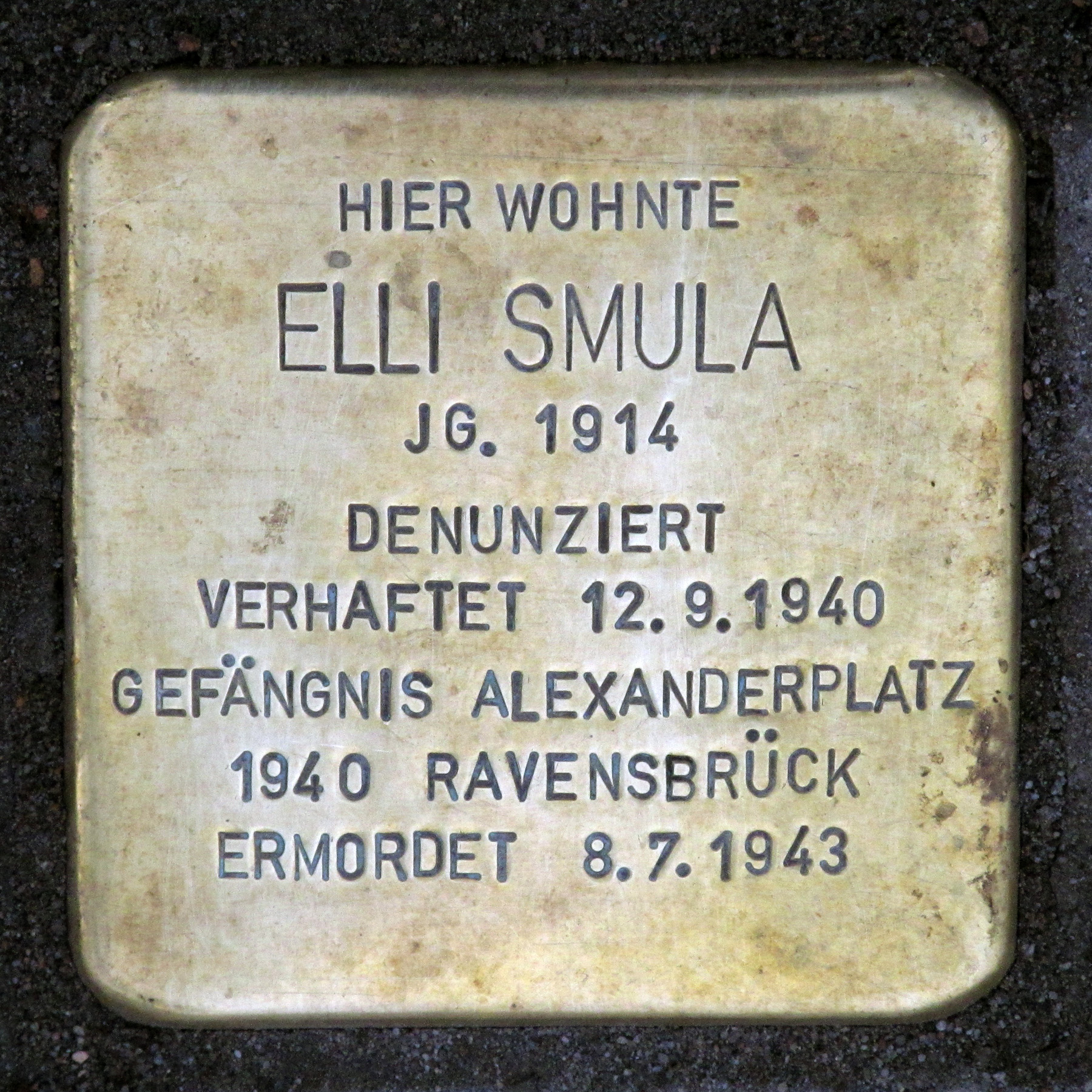
Stone commemorating Elli Smula

Elli Smula (10 October 1914 – 8 July 1943) was a German tram conductor who was arrested in September 1940. She was accused of seriously compromising the Berlin Transport Authority (BVG) by failing to report for work after going out drinking with female fellow workers. Like her colleague Margarete Rosenberg, she was detained by the Gestapo in the prison on Alexanderplatz. BVG had received complaints that some of their female employees were taking their colleagues home, encouraging them to consume alcoholic drinks and involving them in lesbian sexual relationships. The following November both women were transferred to the Ravensbrück Concentration Camp where Smula "suddenly died" on 8 July 1943.

== Biography ==
Born in the Charlottenburg district of Berlin on 10 October 1914, Elli Smula was the daughter of Martha Smula who worked as a housemaid in Hohenlychen, Uckermark. She and her brother Willi were born out of marriage with the result that when her father was killed in World War I, her mother received no pension. The family later moved to Berlin.

In July 1940, as a result of the absence of male workers during World War II, Smula was engaged to work for the Berlin Transport Authority (BVG) as a tram conductor in the Treptow district. The following September both she and Rosenberg were arrested by the Gestapo and taken to the Alexanderplatz prison. They were subsequently each interrogated on at least four occasions by the Gestapo unit responsible for homosexuality. The reason for their detainment was that the BVG had received complaints that women conductors from Treptow had been involved in lesbian intercourse after taking their colleagues back to their apartments and encouraging them to drink. As a result, there were disruptions in the tram service as the women were unable to report for work the following day. After her last interrogation on 10 October 1940, Smula remained in the Alexanderplatz prison until 30 November when, together with Rosenberg, she was transferred to the Ravensbrück Concentration Camp. Both were registered as lesbians although Smula's crime, like Rosenberg's, is thought officially to have been subversive conduct.

Some time during July 1943, her mother was informed by Ravensbrück of Elli Smula's very sudden death on 8 July 1943. No further explanations were given.

== See also ==
- Henny Schermann
- Margarete Rosenberg
