= Black triangle (badge) =

Nazi concentration camp badge for "asocials"

An inverted black triangle, as used in badges.

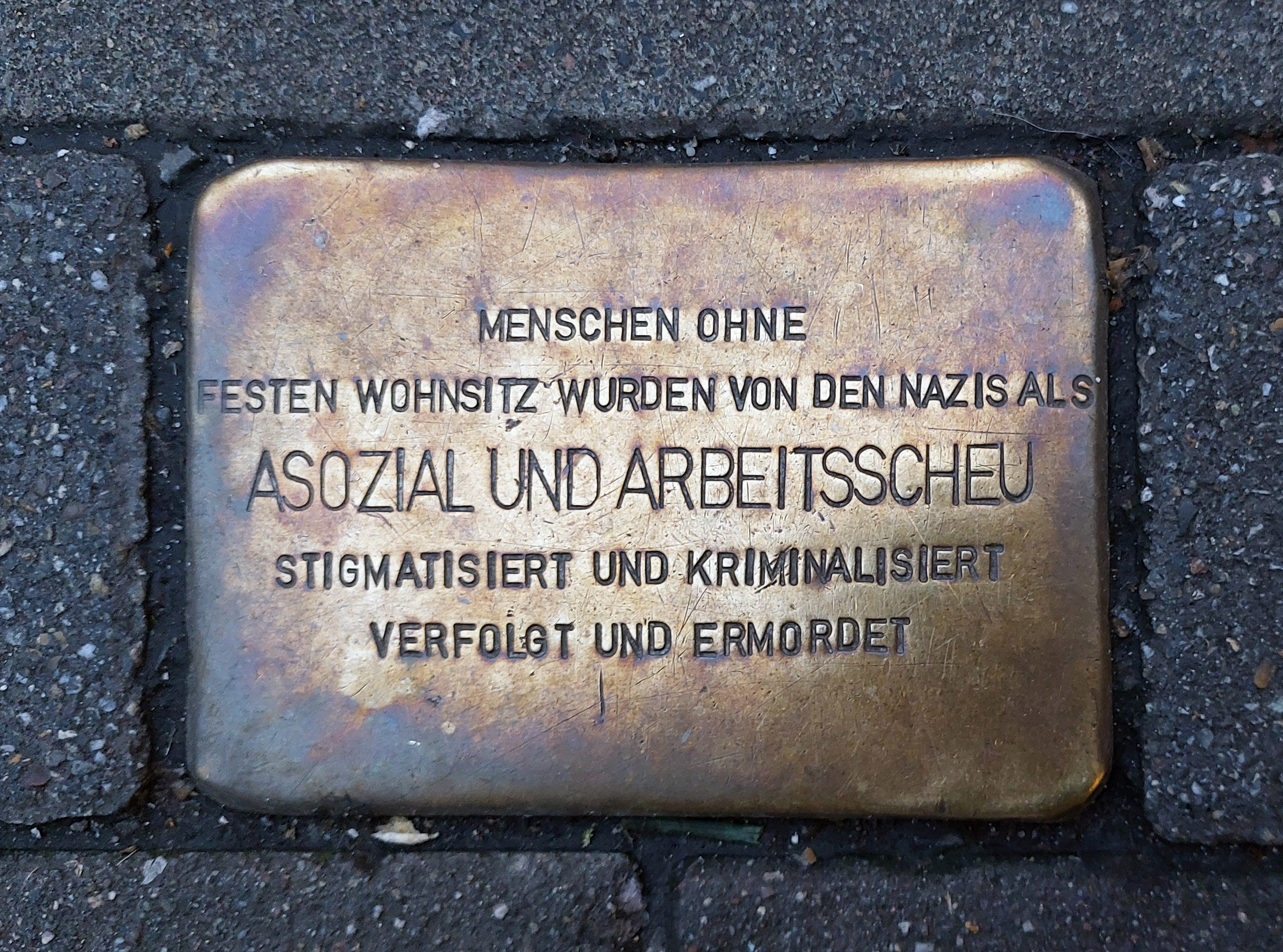
Stolperstein commemorating "asocial and work-shy" individuals, remembering stigmatized and murdered people without fixed residence on Alexanderplatz in Berlin.

The inverted black triangle (German: schwarzer Winkel) was an identification badge used in Nazi concentration camps to mark prisoners designated "asocial" ("a(nti-)social") and arbeitsscheu ("work-shy"). The Roma and Sinti people (Gypsies) were considered asocial and tagged with the black triangle. The Yenish were also counted among the "asocials". The designation also included vagrants, murderers, thieves, prostitutes, (Note: Male sex workers were marked with the pink triangle.) as well as violators of laws prohibiting sexual relations between Aryans and Jews. LGBTQ women, transgender men or transmasculine individuals, and other transgender or otherwise LGBTQ people assigned female at birth were also deemed to be anti-social, including lesbians and others deemed as nonconformists.

== "Asocials" during the Nazi era ==
The term asocial was rooted in a nationalist and racial ideology, with a focus on eugenics. This also applies to "Lumpenproletariat" when occasionally used synonymously by Nazi ideologues and "asocial" researchers. A Nazi synonym that replaced "asocials" was community aliens, or Gemeinschaftsfremde. A law against marginalized social groups was planned and in process but was prevented by the defeat of the Nazi regime in 1945.

Among those arrested as asocial [there were] also enough people who could not be accused of anything other than, for example, having come to work late twice or taken unauthorized leave, changed jobs without permission from the labor office, "mistreated" their National Socialist domestic servant, earned their bread as a gigolo, and suchlike "offenses".

The total number of prisoners classified as "asocials" or "professional criminals" in concentration camps is estimated at 60,000 to 80,000.

== Usage ==
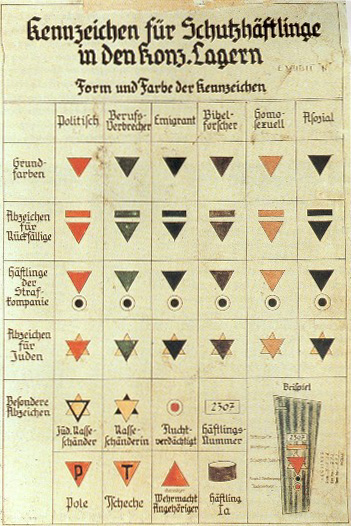
The black triangle in the context of the marking system for prisoners in Nazi concentration camps.

=== Nazi ===
The symbol originates from Nazi Germany, where every prisoner had to wear a concentration camp badge on their prison clothes, of which the design and color categorized them according to the reason for their internment. The homeless were included, as were disabled people, alcoholics, those who habitually avoided labor and employment, draft evaders, pacifists, Roma and Sinti people, and others.

==== Romani ====
Romani first wore the black triangle with a Z notation (for Zigeuner, 'gypsy') to the right of the triangle's point. Male Romani were later assigned a brown triangle in some camps. Female Romani were still deemed asocials as they were stereotyped as petty criminals (prostitutes, kidnappers and fortune tellers).

=== Disabled people ===
The Nazis marked disabled concentration camp inmates with a black triangle. Some United Kingdom-based groups concerned with the rights of disabled people have adopted the symbol in their campaigns, citing press coverage and government policies - including changes to disability benefits and Disability Living Allowance, as the reasons for their campaigns. "The Black Triangle List" was created to keep track of welfare-related deaths due to cuts by the Department for Work and Pensions.

== Aftermath ==
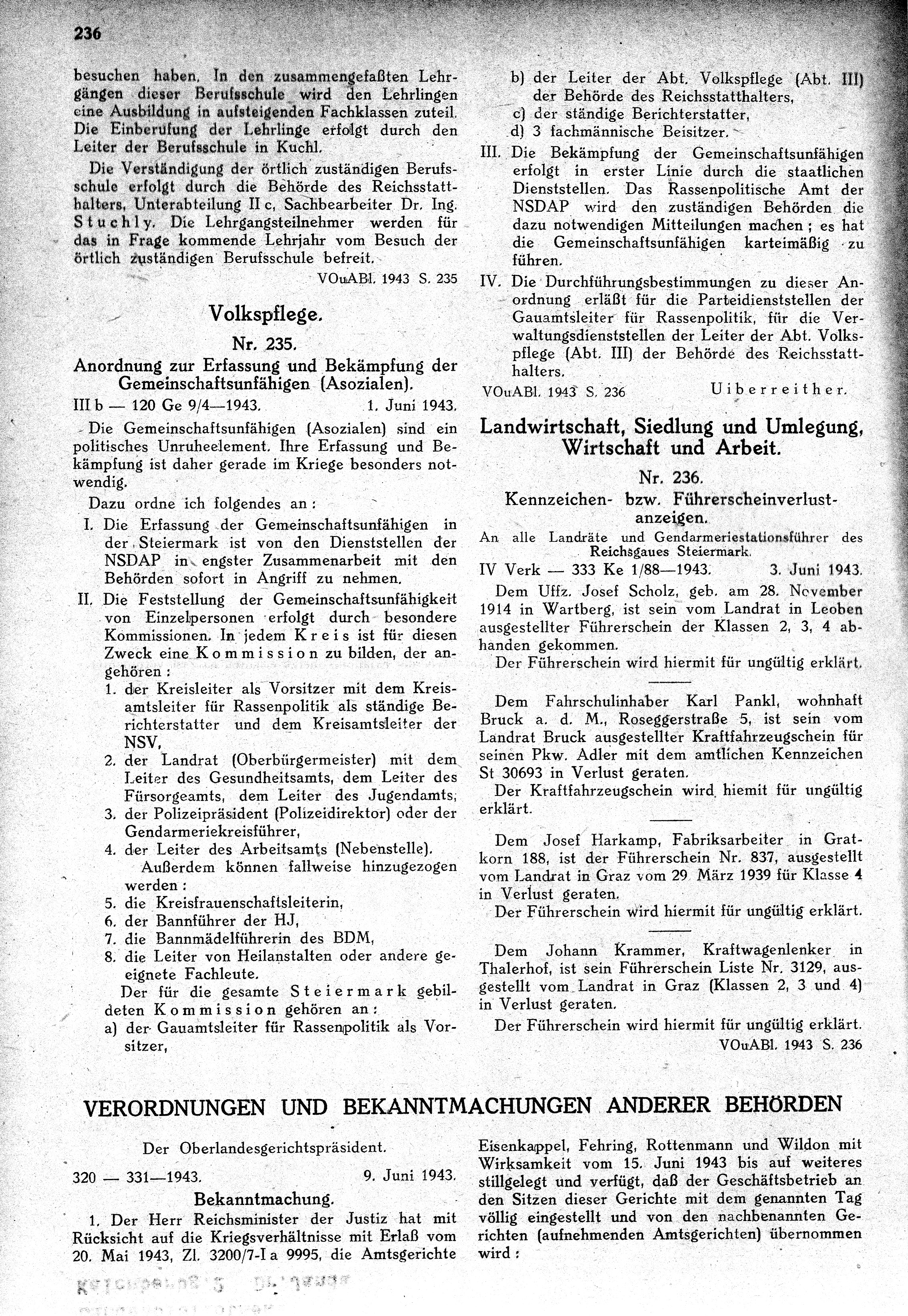
Order for the registration and combating of those incapable of community life (asocials) 1943, Decree No. 235 of the Reichsstatthalter in Styria, Sigfried Uiberreither

=== After the Nazi rule ===
In May 1946, the two former concentration camp prisoners Georg Tauber and Karl Jochheim-Armin published a magazine titled: Truth and Justice! "Black-Green". Internal information bulletin of the concentration camp inmates of Germany, the Black and Green, of which a total of three issues are known. Their goal was the moral recognition of the suffering of asocials and Berufsverbrecher (literally professional criminals) as well as the fight for material compensation for these two categories of concentration camp prisoners. In later issues of the magazine, the admission of "greens" and "blacks" to the administration of the care centers was demanded; the title of the third issue reads: Bi-monthly journal for truth and justice of all former concentration camp inmates and Nazi victims. The magazine also leveled sharp criticism at the behavior of former political prisoners and the negative portrayal of "black" and "green" prisoners in their publications, although they were aware of the problem of public conflicts among prisoner groups.

=== Persistent stereotypes ===
Even after 1945, the term with the underlying complexes of ideas ("saboteur in the building of socialism", "socially harmful […], unwilling […], to integrate into society") remained part of stereotypical everyday thinking in German public opinion. "Asocials" were not recognized as victims of Nazi persecution even by other victims. In Hamburg, survivors of the concentration camps were divided into three categories: Category "I A" were "political conviction offenders", "I B" were non-criminal persecuted, under category "I C" "criminals" and "asocials" were subsumed. They received only material benefits immediately after liberation, some of which were later withdrawn, and were excluded from any compensation. Furthermore, they had to register at the labor offices. The counseling centers and associations, in which former concentration camp prisoners were also involved, often held the view that these criminals and asocials damaged the reputation of all survivors; this was true in both East and West Germany. In the West German compensation law, asocials and Berufsverbrecher were not recognized as victims of persecution and, thus, not entitled to compensation.

In the GDR, this tradition came into effect in the Penal Code of 1968 in § 249 "Endangering public order through asocial behavior", the "Asi paragraph". Previously, courts had interpreted the Ordinance on Residence Restrictions of August 24, 1961 in such a way that persons "who could not be integrated into socialist society" could be sentenced to force labor.

Of the approximately 230,000 people imprisoned in the GDR between 1960 and 1990 for political reasons, 130,000 were convicted as asocials for non-conformist lifestyles.

=== Compensation ===
Asocials were not recognized as victims of Nazi persecution in either West Germany or East Germany. Therefore, there was also no targeted compensation for this group. Even in the GDR, widespread negative attitudes toward asocials prevented their full recognition as victims of Nazi persecution.

The group of so-called asocials was not entitled under the Federal Supplementary Compensation Act for Victims of National Socialist Persecution (BEG) in West Germany. As "persecuted for reasons of political opposition to National Socialism", cases were excluded from the outset "in which it was merely occasional expressions of displeasure, morally unjustified acts of violence, asocials as well as such persons who are determined to fight any state order, whatever it may be." The regulation of damages suffered by someone for reasons other than those finally listed in §1 of the Federal Compensation Law (in German, Bundesentschädigungsgesetz) was to take place elsewhere according to the will of the legislator of 1955.

Only since 1988 has a fund based on the hardship guidelines of the General Law Regulating Compensation for War-Induced Losses (AKG) has granted surviving victims with a one-time grant, ongoing benefits and supplementary ongoing benefits in special financial emergencies under certain circumstances. According to the Federal Government, a total of 205 surviving victims from the "asocials" group received a one-time payment of €2,556.46 in 2008.

Legally imposed punishments are also considered unjust if they are judged as excessive, taking into account the circumstances of the time and, in particular, the wartime conditions. Benefits are also granted to persons who served prison sentences between 1933 and 1945 if these were based on criminal decisions that were annulled by law, for example after the Law on the Annulment of National Socialist Injustice Judgments in Criminal Justice of 1998. Persons who suffered a loss of liberty receive a one-time amount of €76.69 for each commenced month of imprisonment, up to a maximum total of €2,556.

In early 2018, the social scientist Frank Nonnenmacher launched a petition together with the historians and political scientists Julia Hörath, Dagmar Lieske and Sylvia Köchl and the sociologist Andreas Kranebitter for the "recognition of 'asocials' and 'professional criminals' as victims of National Socialism". Among the initial signatories were, among others, Volker Beck, Micha Brumlik, Daniel Cohn-Bendit, Detlef Garbe, Barbara Glück, Jürgen Habermas, Benno Hafeneger, Wilhelm Heitmeyer, Peter Tauber, Wolfgang Thierse, Konstantin Wecker and Michael Wildt. Thanks to Nonnenmacher's initiative, official recognition by the Bundestag took place in February 2020.

=== Recognition of the victims and subsequent developments ===
The German Bundestag decided on February 13, 2020, to recognize the persecution of victims designated by the Nazis as "asocials" and "professional criminals" and to commemorate them in a special way. At the same time, the government was tasked with taking a number of relevant measures. The exhibition announced at the time has been viewable online since June 2022, but relevant research is still pending.

During 2023, MDR, Südwestrundfunk and the Frankfurter Allgemeine Zeitung urged the implementation of the 2020 decision.

=== Commemoration at Sachsenhausen Memorial ===
On July 18, 2023, the victims' association unveiled a memorial stele designed by Ines Dietrich at the Sachsenhausen concentration camp memorial and museum to commemorate the prisoners persecuted as "asocials".

== Film ==
The documentary film by the Initiative for a Memorial Site Former Uckermark concentration camp e.V. in cooperation with the Austrian Camp Community: …that it is still like that today – Continuities of Exclusion exemplarily describes the history of persecution and stigmatization of so-called asocials under the Nazi Regime.

== Theater play ==
Theater maker Harald Hahn developed a theater piece Monologue with my "asocial" grandfather – A prisoner in Buchenwald.

== See also ==
- Ableism – Discrimination on grounds of disability
- Antiziganism – Racism against Romani people
- Aktion Arbeitsscheu Reich – Waves of Nazi arrests of people deemed "socially undesirable"
- Anti-homelessness legislation – Laws regarding homelessness
- Discrimination – Prejudicial treatment based on membership in a certain group
- Discrimination against disabled people – Discrimination on grounds of disability
- Discrimination against homeless people
- Discrimination against lesbians – Irrational fear of, and aversion to, lesbians
- Identification in Nazi camps – Prisoners' camp identification numbers, cloth emblems, and armbands
- LGBTQ symbols – Flags and symbols used by the LGBTQ community
- Persecution of Chinese people in Nazi Germany
- Romani genocide – Genocide of the Romani in Europe during World War II
- Nazi concentration camp badge § Single triangles
  - Blue triangle – Cloth emblems; part of the system of identification in Nazi camps
  - Brown triangle – Genocide of the Romani in Europe during World War II
  - Green triangle – Cloth emblems; part of the system of identification in Nazi camps
  - P (Nazi symbol) – Sign for Polish workers during the NS-Regime in Nazi Germany
  - Pink triangle – Symbol for the LGBTQIA+ community
  - Red triangle (badge) – Symbol of anti-fascism
  - Yellow badge – Badge forced to be worn by Jews
