= Henny Schermann =

German lesbian and Holocaust victim

- Born: 19 February 1912; Frankfurt, Hesse, Germany
- Died: 30 May 1942 (aged 30); Bernburg Euthanasia Centre, Bernburg, Saxony-Anhalt, Nazi Germany
- Cause of death: Gassed to death
- Citizenship: Germany
- Occupation: Shop assistant
- Known for: As a lesbian victim of the Holocaust

Henny Schermann (19 February 1912 – 30 May 1942) was a Jewish lesbian from Germany, who was murdered in Bernburg Euthanasia Centre.

== Biography ==
Henny Schermann was born on 19 February 1912 in Frankfurt. She was the first of three children to a Jewish couple; her father was a Russian-Jewish immigrant, but her mother was of German-Jewish descent. Her parents separated in 1931 and her mother, Selma, took over the running of the family shoe shop at Meisengasse 6; the shop was later forced to close due to antisemitic boycotts.

Under the Name Change Ordinance, which took effect in January 1939, Jewish women who did not already bear a name classified by the Nazi authorities as Jewish were required to add Sara to their names. Despite this, Schermann, who worked as an assistant in a shop, refused to use the middle name. She continued to visit lesbian bars in Frankfurt, behaviour which was dangerous since homosexuality was illegal in Nazi Germany.

In March 1940, Schermann was arrested and interned in the Ravensbrück concentration camp for women, where, on the back of her photo, the doctor and specialist in eugenics, Friedrich Mennecke (de), wrote:

“Jenny Sara Schermann, born February 19, 1912 in Frankfurt am Main. Single saleswoman in Frankfurt am Main. Licentious lesbian, only frequents [homosexual] bars. Refused the first name 'Sara'. Stateless Jew.”

Mennecke was also the doctor assigned to Mary Pünjer, who was accused of lesbianism. After two years in the concentration camp, Schermann was sent to the Bernburg Euthanasia Centre, near Magdeburg, which specialised in the elimination of "asocial" elements from society. She was murdered in a gas chamber there on 30 May 1942.

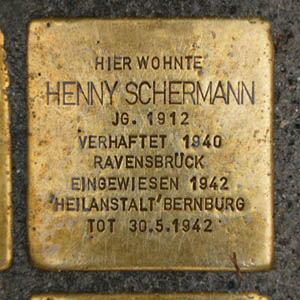
Stolperstein Meisengasse 6b Henny Schermann

Shermann's mother Selma and her sister Regina were deported in the first convoy to leave Frankfurt on 19 October 1941. They were murdered in Lodz, Poland. The dates of their murders are unknown. Her brother, Herbert, had moved to Paris, France, before the war with his father Julius Schermann, where he married Helene Baitch and had one son, Max Schermann. In 1941 he was arrested in Paris and was held at the Drancy camp during one year until he was deported to Auschwitz concentration camp where he was murdered on 23 September 1942.

== Legacy ==
Schermann's life is commemorated with a Stolperstein at the address of her family's shoe shop in Frankfurt. As one of the few lesbian women whose persecution by the Nazi state is documented, there has been an increased interest in her life as historians record and examine the persecution of homosexual communities during the Second World War.

Schermann was undoubtedly murdered because she was Jewish. However, Mennecke's comment on her passport photo demonstrates a direct interest in and condemnation of her sexuality by a leading doctor of eugenics at the Ravensbrück camp. Her dispatch to the Bernburg Euthanasia Facility, shows how the authorities continued a targeted persecution of homosexual women, who were guilty, according to Nazi ideology, of lowering the Reich's birth rate and weakening the "master race".

== See also ==
- Elsa Conrad
