= Bonów =

Bonów refers to the following places in Poland:

- Bonów, Lublin Voivodeship
- Bonów, Lubusz Voivodeship

== See also ==
- Bonow, a Low German surname
