= Bujanica =

- Part of the village
- Location within Poland
- Coordinates: 51°3′13″N 22°47′24″E
- Country: Poland
- Voivodeship: Lublin Voivodeship
- County: Świdnik County
- Gmina: Rybczewice
- Village: Stryjno Drugie

Bujanica is a part of the Stryjno Drugie in the administrative district of Gmina Rybczewice, within Świdnik County, Lublin Voivodeship. It lies approximately 9 kilometres north-west of Rybczewice, 37 kilometres south-east of the voivodeship capital Lublin, and 29 kilometres south-east of the county capital Świdnik.
