= Janówek, Gmina Piaski =

Janówek
- Village
- Location within Poland
- Coordinates: 51°09′33″N 22°47′13″E
- Country: Poland
- Voivodeship: Lublin
- County: Świdnik
- Gmina: Piaski

Janówek [jaˈnuvɛk] is a village in the administrative district of Gmina Piaski, within Świdnik County, Lublin Voivodeship, in eastern Poland.
