= Wierzchowiska Pierwsze =

Wierzchowiska Pierwsze may refer to the following places:

- Wierzchowiska Pierwsze, Janów County in Lublin Voivodeship (east Poland)
- Wierzchowiska Pierwsze, Świdnik County in Lublin Voivodeship (east Poland)
- Wierzchowiska Pierwsze, Masovian Voivodeship (east-central Poland)
