= Siedliszczki, Świdnik County =

Siedliszczki
- Village
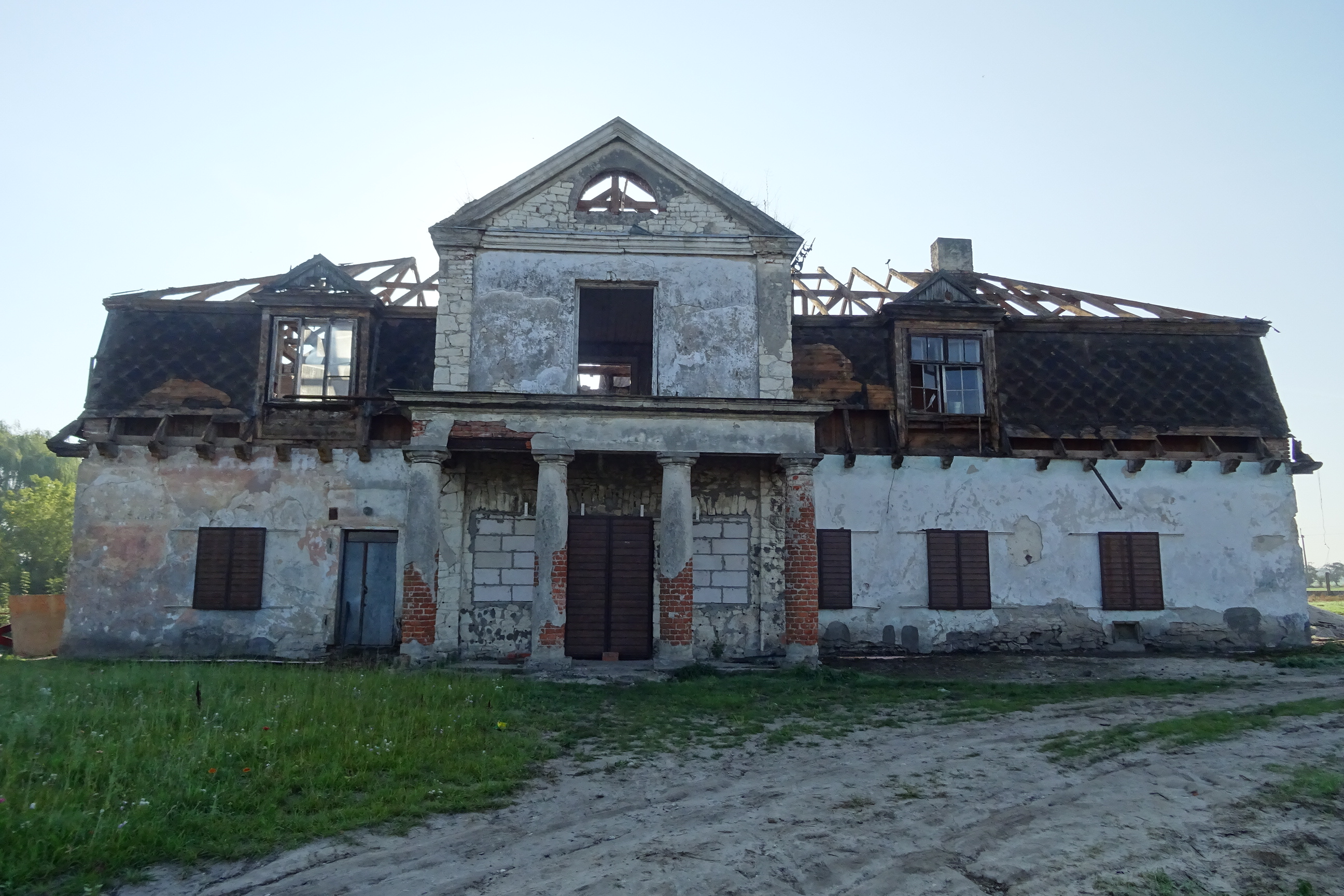

- Location within Poland
- Coordinates: 51°8′16″N 22°53′39″E
- Country: Poland
- Voivodeship: Lublin
- County: Świdnik
- Gmina: Piaski

Population
  - Total: 350
- Time zone: UTC+1 (CET)
  - Summer (DST): UTC+2 (CEST)

Siedliszczki [ɕɛdˈliʂt͡ʂki] is a village in the administrative district of Gmina Piaski, within Świdnik County, Lublin Voivodeship, in eastern Poland.

== History ==
Four Polish citizens were murdered by Nazi Germany in the village during World War II.
