= Wygnanowice =

- Village
- Location within Poland
- Coordinates: 51°5′N 22°51′E
- Country: Poland
- Voivodeship: Lublin
- County: Świdnik
- Gmina: Rybczewice

Wygnanowice [vɨɡnanɔˈvit͡sɛ] is a village in the administrative district of Gmina Rybczewice, within Świdnik County, Lublin Voivodeship, in eastern Poland.
