= Nowiny, Świdnik County =

Nowiny
- Village
- Location within Poland
- Coordinates: 51°10′53″N 22°50′20″E
- Country: Poland
- Voivodeship: Lublin
- County: Świdnik
- Gmina: Piaski

Nowiny [nɔˈvinɨ] is a village in the administrative district of Gmina Piaski, within Świdnik County, Lublin Voivodeship, in eastern Poland.
