= Siostrzytów =

- Village
- Location within Poland
- Coordinates: 51°11′N 22°59′E
- Country: Poland
- Voivodeship: Lublin
- County: Świdnik
- Gmina: Trawniki

Siostrzytów [ɕɔsˈtʂɨtuf] is a village in the administrative district of Gmina Trawniki, within Świdnik County, Lublin Voivodeship, in eastern Poland.
