= Izdebno, Lublin Voivodeship =

Izdebno
- Village
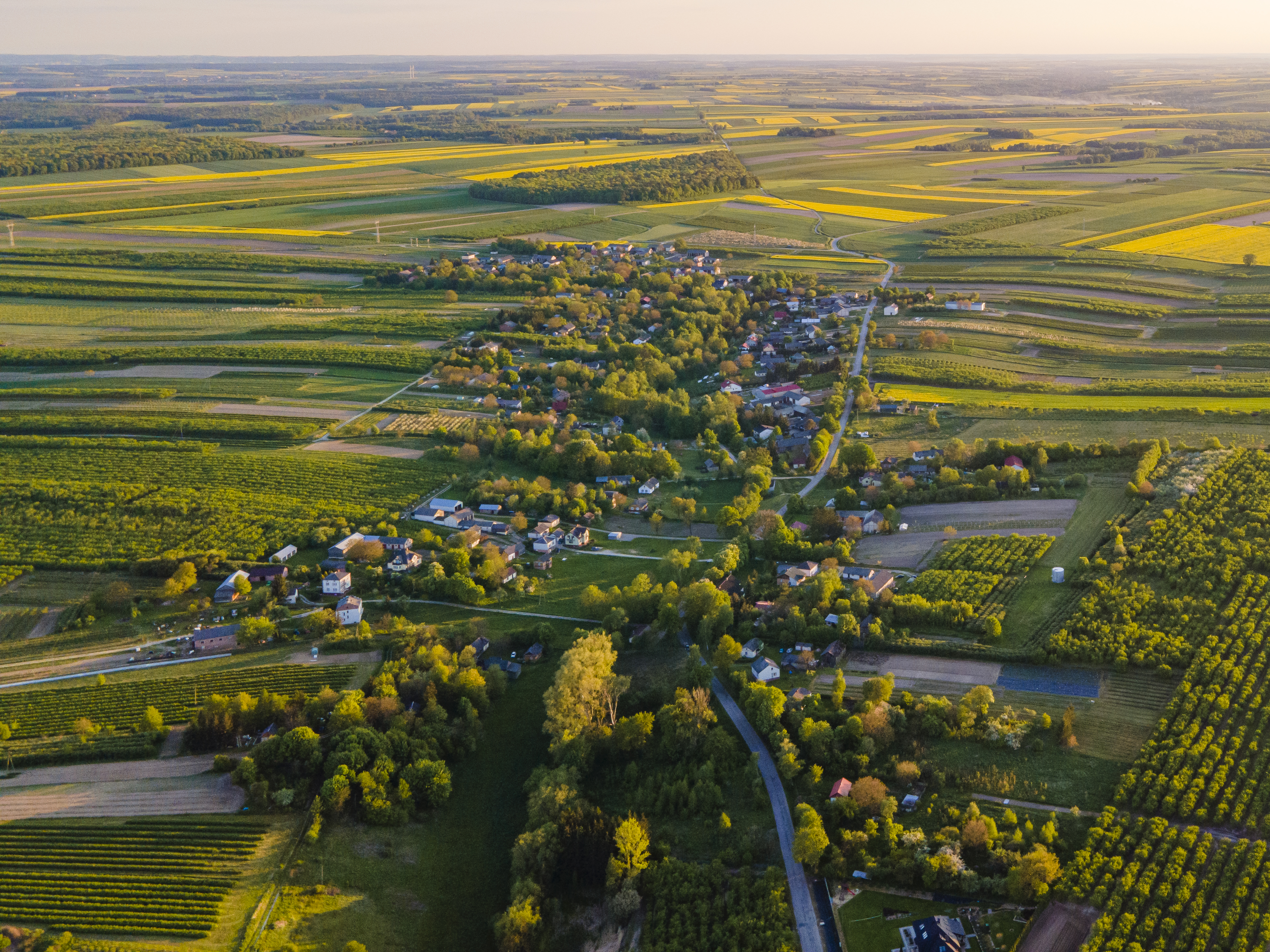
- Aerial view of Izdebno

- Location within Poland
- Coordinates: 51°00′04″N 22°55′12″E
- Country: Poland
- Voivodeship: Lublin
- County: Świdnik
- Gmina: Rybczewice
- Time zone: UTC+1 (CET)
  - Summer (DST): UTC+2 (CEST)

Izdebno [izˈdɛbnɔ] is a village in the administrative district of Gmina Rybczewice, within Świdnik County, Lublin Voivodeship, in eastern Poland.

== History ==
12 Polish citizens were murdered by Nazi Germany in the village during World War II.
