= Choiny, Lublin Voivodeship =

Choiny
- Village
- Location within Poland
- Coordinates: 51°4′N 22°47′E
- Country: Poland
- Voivodeship: Lublin
- County: Świdnik
- Gmina: Rybczewice
- Time zone: UTC+1 (CET)
  - Summer (DST): UTC+2 (CEST)
- Vehicle registration: LSW

Choiny [ˈxɔi̯nɨ] is a village in the administrative district of Gmina Rybczewice, within Świdnik County, Lublin Voivodeship, in eastern Poland.

One Polish citizen was murdered by Nazi Germany in the village during World War II.
