= Kozice Dolne-Kolonia =

- Village
- Location within Poland
- Coordinates: 51°07′58″N 22°46′50″E
- Country: Poland
- Voivodeship: Lublin
- County: Świdnik
- Gmina: Piaski

Kozice Dolne-Kolonia [kɔˈʑit͡sɛ ˈdɔlnɛ kɔˈlɔɲa] is a village in the administrative district of Gmina Piaski, within Świdnik County, Lublin Voivodeship, in eastern Poland.
