= Majdan Kawęczyński =

- Village
- Location within Poland
- Coordinates: 51°8′N 22°44′E
- Country: Poland
- Voivodeship: Lublin
- County: Świdnik
- Gmina: Piaski
- Population (approx.): 160

Majdan Kawęczyński (Polish pronunciation: [ˈmajdaŋ kavɛnˈtʂɨj̃skʲi]) is a village in the administrative district of Gmina Piaski, within Świdnik County, Lublin Voivodeship, in eastern Poland.
