= Oleśniki =

- Village
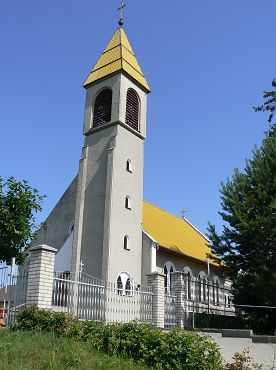
- Our Lady of Częstochowa church in Oleśniki

- Location within Poland
- Coordinates: 51°7′N 23°2′E
- Country: Poland
- Voivodeship: Lublin
- County: Świdnik
- Gmina: Trawniki
- Time zone: UTC+1 (CET)
  - Summer (DST): UTC+2 (CEST)
- Website: http://www.olesniki.xt.pl

Oleśniki [ɔlɛɕˈniki] is a village in the administrative district of Gmina Trawniki, within Świdnik County, Lublin Voivodeship, in eastern Poland.

== History ==
Eight Polish citizens were murdered by Nazi Germany in the village during World War II.
