= Trawniki-Kolonia =

- Village
- Location within Poland
- Coordinates: 51°09′03″N 22°59′05″E
- Country: Poland
- Voivodeship: Lublin
- County: Świdnik
- Gmina: Trawniki

Trawniki-Kolonia [travˈniki kɔˈlɔɲa] is a village in the administrative district of Gmina Trawniki, within Świdnik County, Lublin Voivodeship, in eastern Poland.
