= Brzeziczki =

- Village
- Location within Poland
- Coordinates: 51°8′N 22°51′E
- Country: Poland
- Voivodeship: Lublin
- County: Świdnik
- Gmina: Piaski
- Elevation: 186 m (610 ft)

Brzeziczki (Polish pronunciation: [bʐɛˈʑitskʲi]) is a village in the administrative district of Gmina Piaski, within Świdnik County, Lublin Voivodeship, in eastern Poland.
