= Podizdebno =

- Village
- Location within Poland
- Coordinates: 51°0′55″N 22°53′41″E
- Country: Poland
- Voivodeship: Lublin
- County: Świdnik
- Gmina: Rybczewice

Podizdebno [pɔdizˈdɛbnɔ] is a village in the administrative district of Gmina Rybczewice, within Świdnik County, Lublin Voivodeship, in eastern Poland.
