= Klimusin =

- Village
- Location within Poland
- Coordinates: 51°05′33″N 22°52′56″E
- Country: Poland
- Voivodeship: Lublin
- County: Świdnik
- Gmina: Piaski

Klimusin [kliˈmuɕin] is a village in the administrative district of Gmina Piaski, within Świdnik County, Lublin Voivodeship, in eastern Poland.
