= Majdanek Kozicki =

- Village
- Location within Poland
- Coordinates: 51°06′52″N 22°45′21″E
- Country: Poland
- Voivodeship: Lublin
- County: Świdnik
- Gmina: Piaski

Majdanek Kozicki [mai̯ˈdanɛk kɔˈʑit͡ski] is a village in the administrative district of Gmina Piaski, within Świdnik County, Lublin Voivodeship, in eastern Poland.
