= Żegotów =

- Village
- Location within Poland
- Coordinates: 51°4′30″N 22°52′42″E
- Country: Poland
- Voivodeship: Lublin
- County: Świdnik
- Gmina: Piaski
- Population: 110

Żegotów [ʐɛˈɡɔtuf] is a village in the administrative district of Gmina Piaski, within Świdnik County, Lublin Voivodeship, in eastern Poland.
