= Pilaszkowice Drugie =

- Village
- Location within Poland
- Coordinates: 50°59′2.97″N 22°50′9.75″E
- Country: Poland
- Voivodeship: Lublin
- County: Świdnik
- Gmina: Rybczewice

Pilaszkowice Drugie [pilaʂkɔˈvit͡sɛ ˈdruɡʲɛ] is a village in the administrative district of Gmina Rybczewice, within Świdnik County, Lublin Voivodeship, in eastern Poland.
