= Majdan Brzezicki =

- Village
- Location within Poland
- Coordinates: 51°10′49″N 22°51′44″E
- Country: Poland
- Voivodeship: Lublin
- County: Świdnik
- Gmina: Piaski

Majdan Brzezicki (Polish pronunciation: [ˈmajdan bʐɛˈʑitskʲi]) is a village in the administrative district of Gmina Piaski, within Świdnik County, Lublin Voivodeship, in eastern Poland.
