= Jadwisin, Świdnik County =

Jadwisin
- Village
- Location within Poland
- Coordinates: 51°08′01″N 22°42′12″E
- Country: Poland
- Voivodeship: Lublin
- County: Świdnik
- Gmina: Piaski

Jadwisin [jadˈviɕin] is a village in the administrative district of Gmina Piaski, within Świdnik County, Lublin Voivodeship, in eastern Poland.
