= Kolonia Wola Piasecka =

- Village
- Location within Poland
- Coordinates: 51°08′57″N 22°47′48″E
- Country: Poland
- Voivodeship: Lublin
- County: Świdnik
- Gmina: Piaski

Kolonia Wola Piasecka [kɔˈlɔɲa ˈvɔla pjaˈsɛt͡ska] is a village in the administrative district of Gmina Piaski, within Świdnik County, Lublin Voivodeship, in eastern Poland.
