= Dorohucza =

- Village
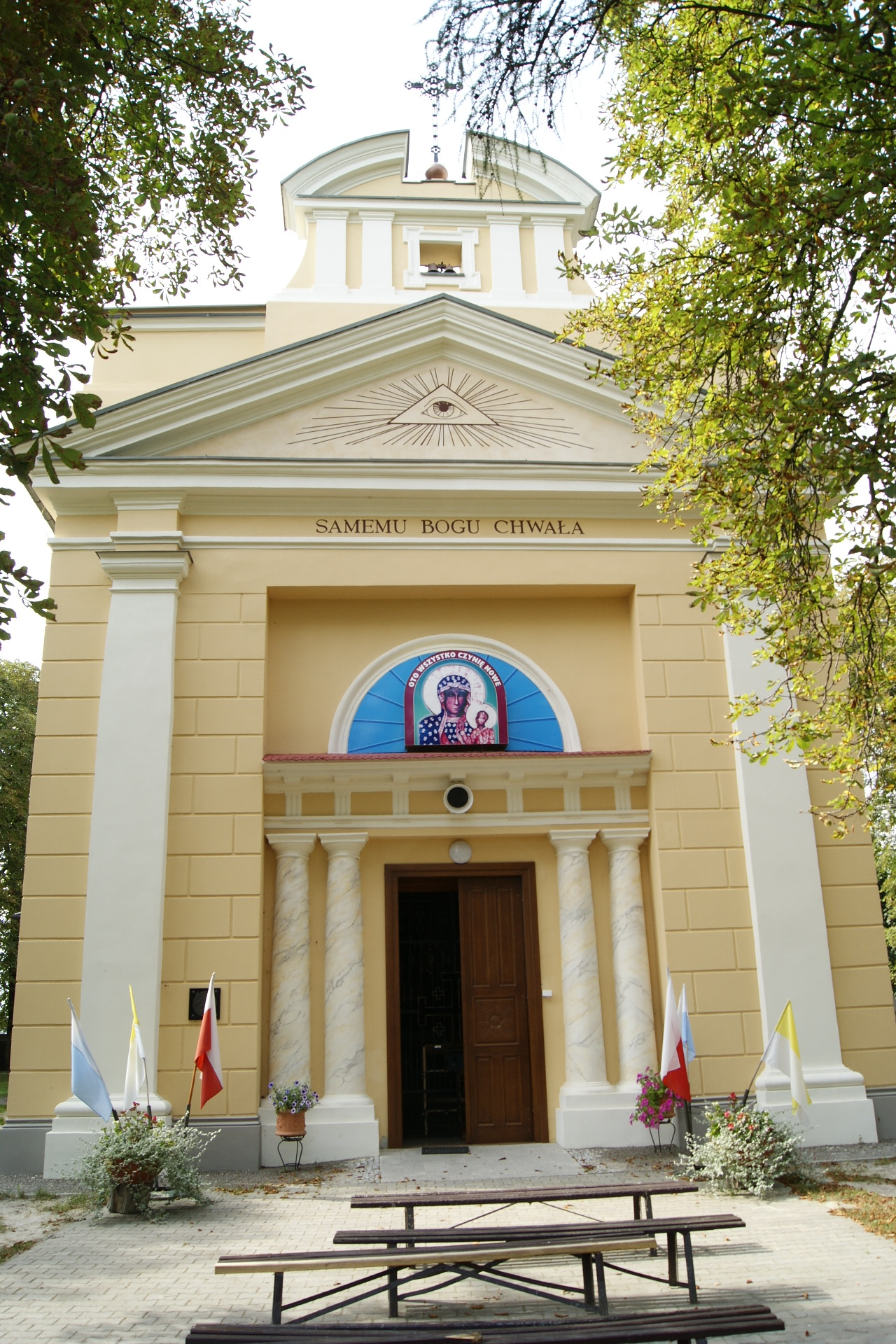
- Church of Saint Jude Thaddeus the Apostle in Dorohucza

- Location within Poland
- Coordinates: 51°10′N 23°1′E
- Country: Poland
- Voivodeship: Lublin
- County: Świdnik
- Gmina: Trawniki

Population
  - Total: 753

Dorohucza [dɔrɔˈxut͡ʂa] is a village in the administrative district of Gmina Trawniki, within Świdnik County, Lublin Voivodeship, in eastern Poland.

== World War II ==
During the occupation of Poland by Nazi Germany in World War II Dorohucza was the location of a forced labor camp of the Lublin Reservation complex. According to historian Jules Schelvis, at least 700 Dutch Jews were imprisoned there building latifundia of Generalplan Ost for the German settlers. They were transferred to Dorohucza directly upon arrival in Sobibór extermination camp. The Dorohucza camp was located just east of the village, five kilometres (three miles) from the Trawniki concentration camp, used as training base for the Trawniki men from Reichskommissariat Ukraine. The camp was liquidated at the start of Aktion Erntefest of 3 November 1943.

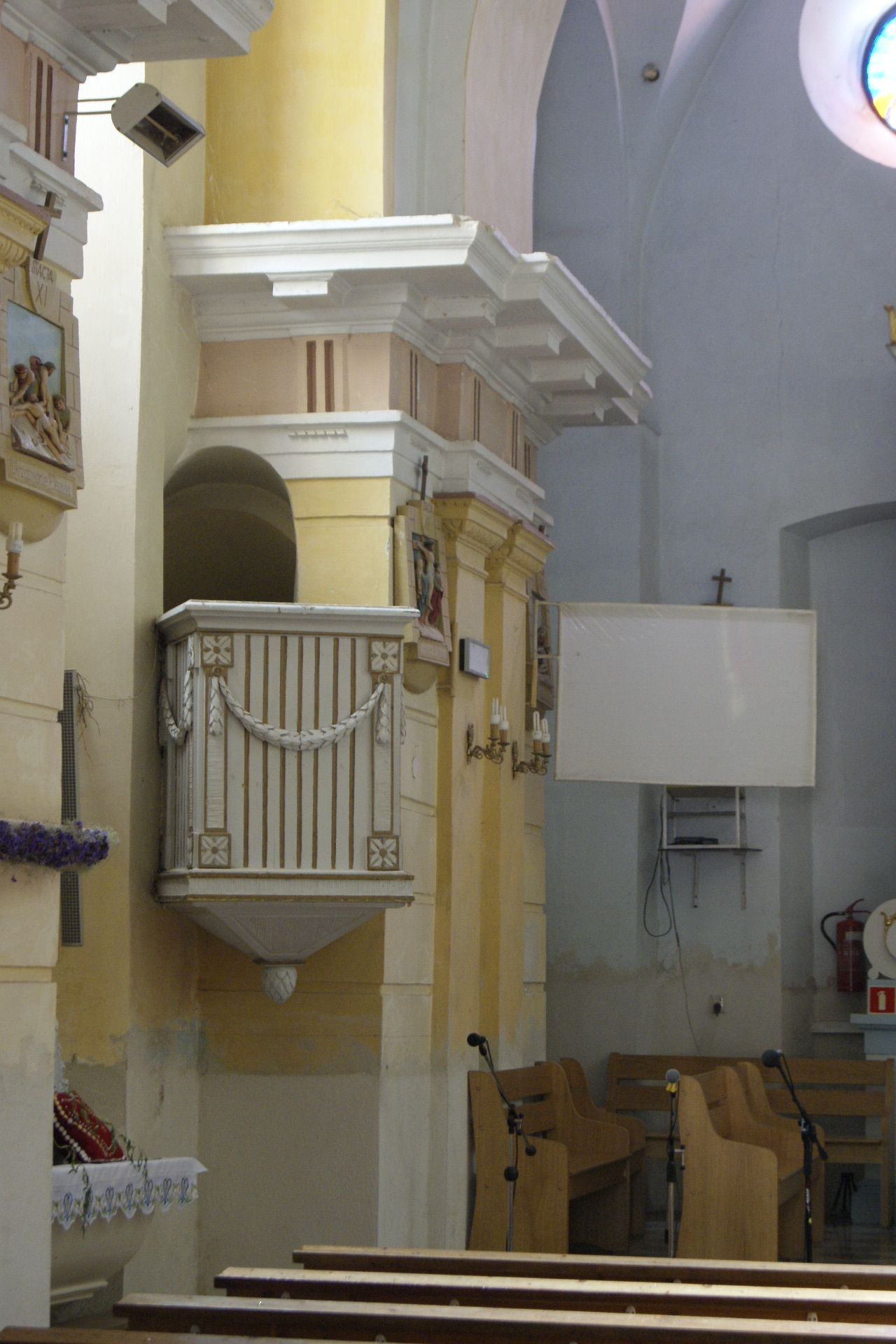

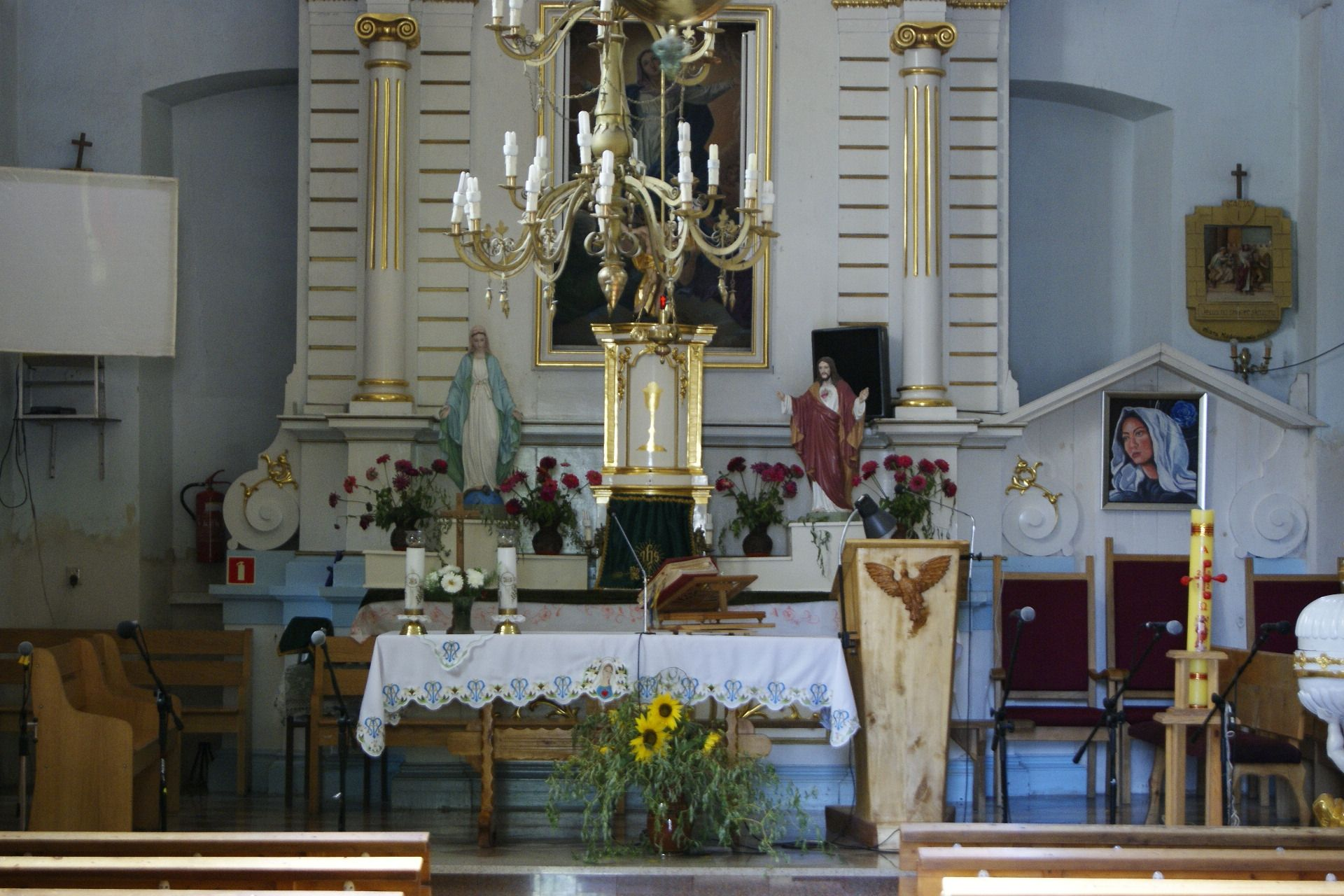

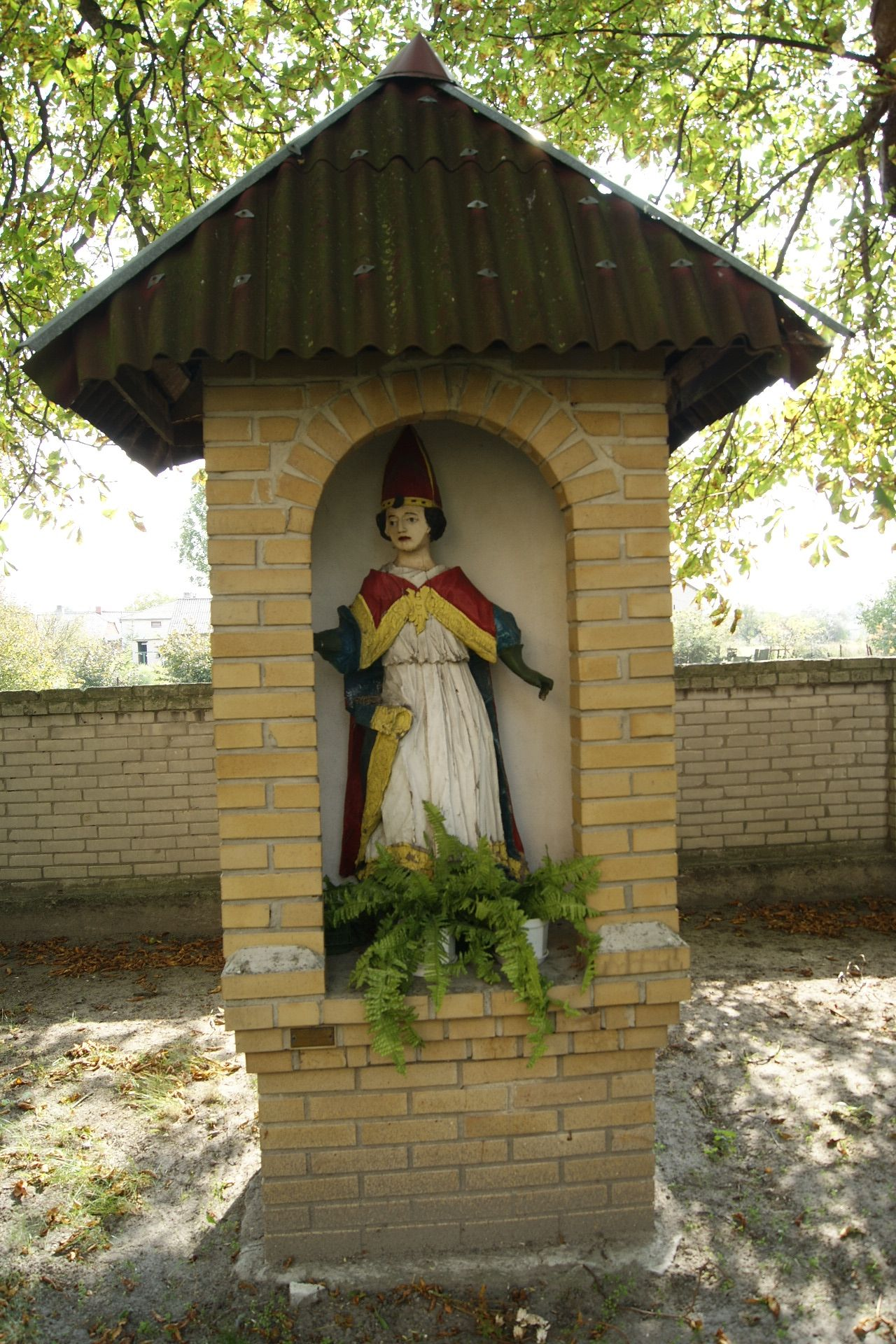

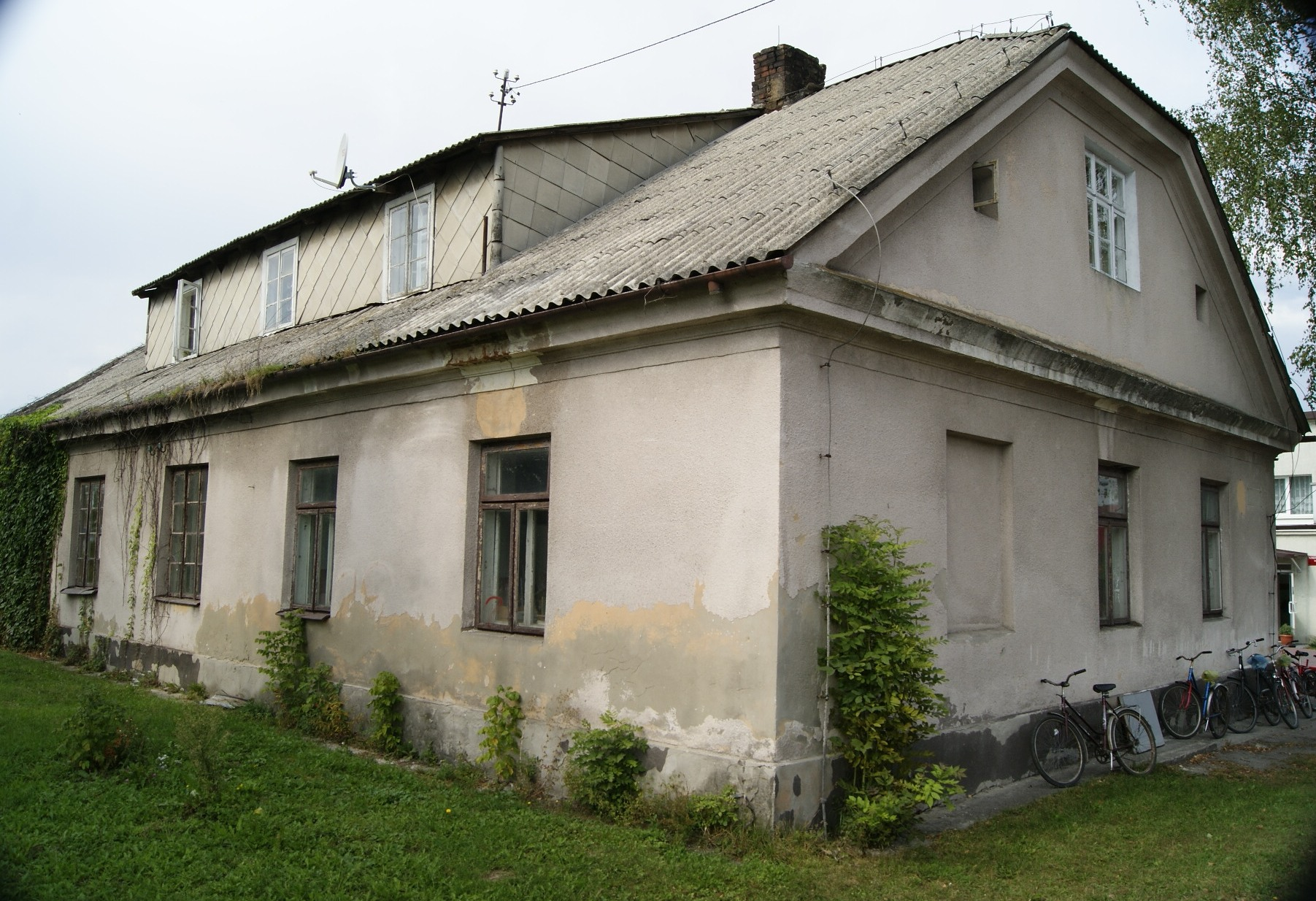

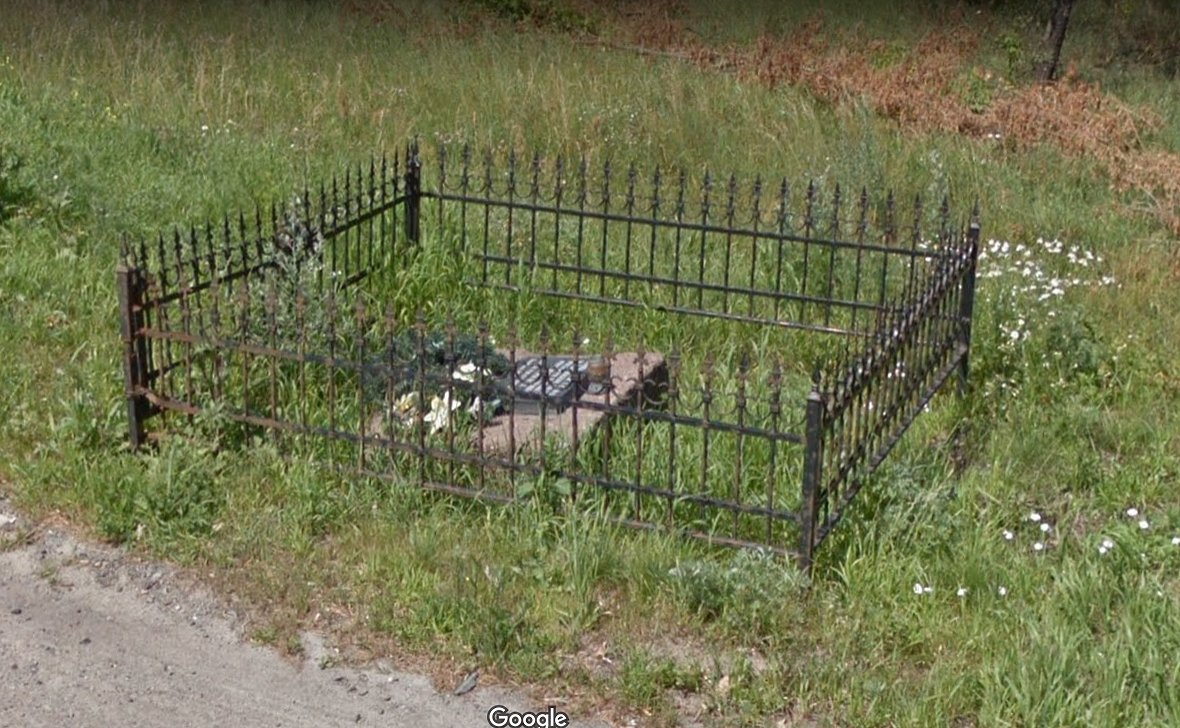
War memorial near former camp Dorohucza

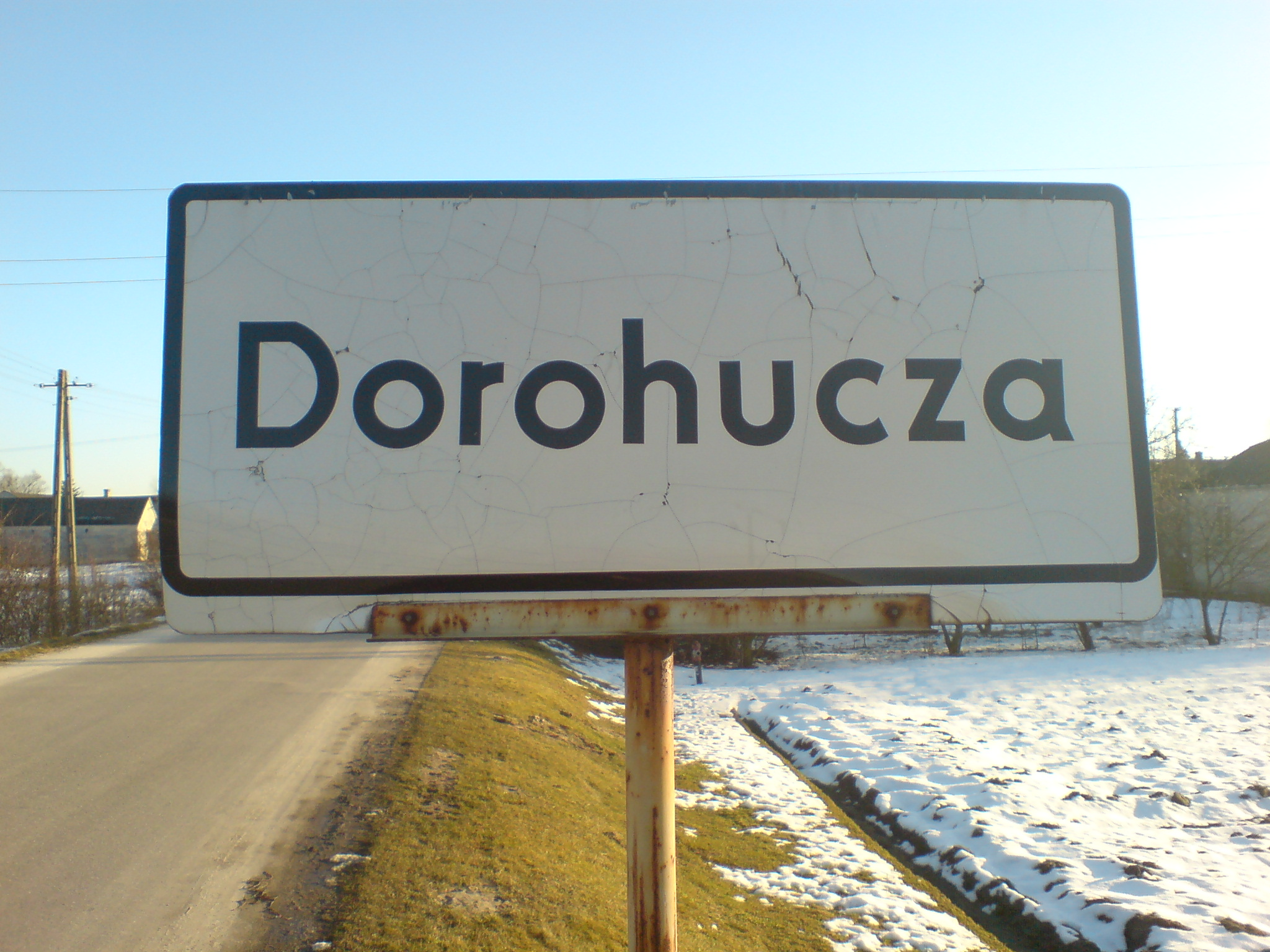
