= Petrokemija =

Croatian fertilizer company

Petrokemija d.d.

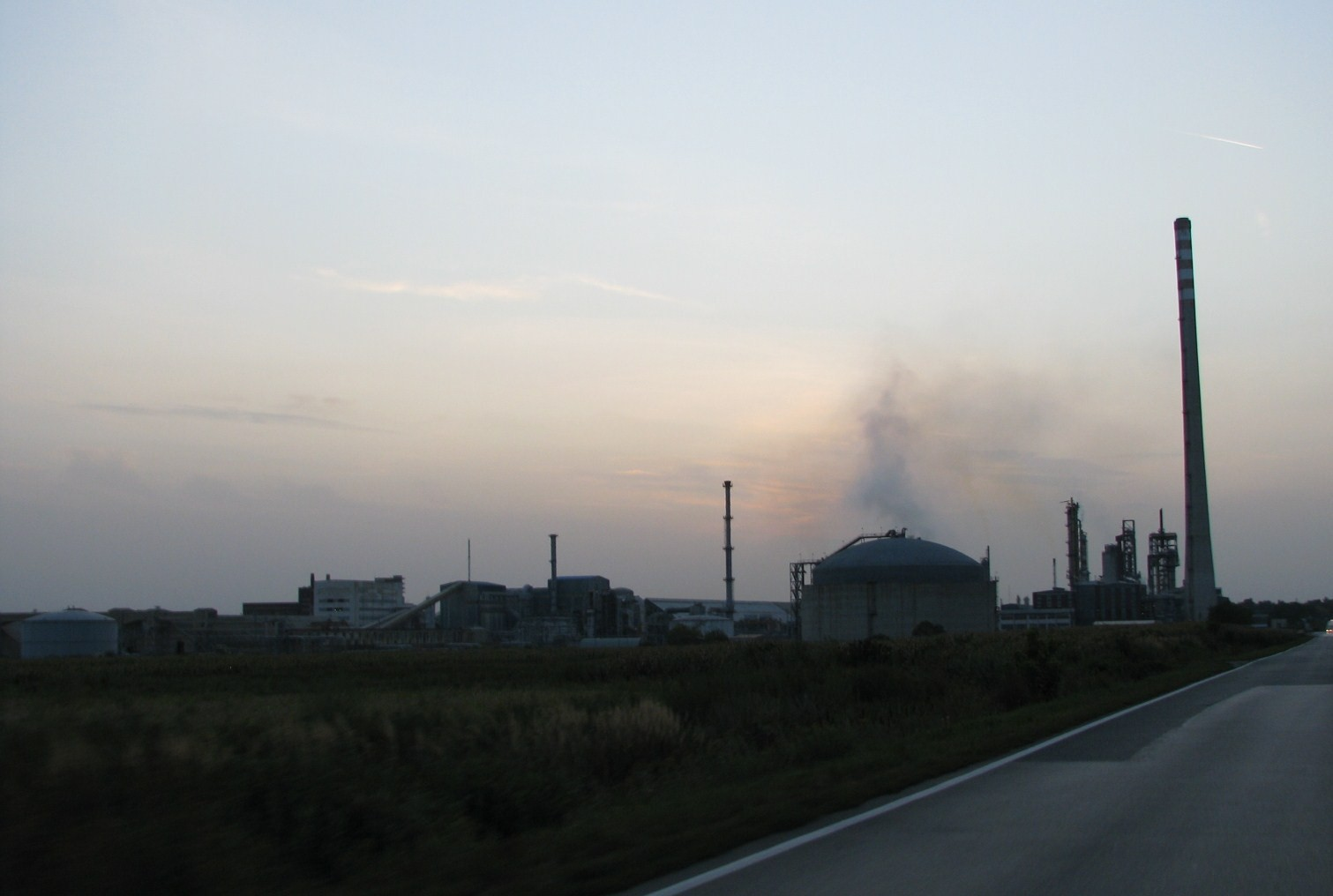
- Company type: Public
- Traded as: ZSE: PTKM
- Industry: Chemical
- Founded: 1968 (founded as subsidiary of INA; separated into an independent company and privatised in 1998)
- Headquarters: Kutina, Croatia
- Key people: Davor Žmegač (CEO)
- Products: Fertilizers
- Net income: HRK -6.1 million (2021)HRK 266.8 million (2020)HRK 154 million (2019)HRK 78.3 million (2007) ▲ from HRK –84.4 million in 2006
- Number of employees: 1,250
- Website: petrokemija.hr

Petrokemija is a Croatian chemical company which specializes in manufacturing agricultural fertilizers. It was founded in 1968 as a branch of the state-owned oil company INA with its headquarters in Kutina. In the late 1990s it was privatised and in 1998 it was incorporated as an independent joint stock company and listed at the Zagreb Stock Exchange. Petrokemija is, after INA, the second-largest exporter in the country. It is one of 24 companies included in the CROBEX share index.

== History ==
Explored oil and gas deposits in Moslavina and Western Slavonia led to the construction in 1926 of a carbon black plant in Brezine near Lipik, which used gas from neighboring Bujavica. Production of soot in Kutina, which is still intended mainly for the rubber industry, began in 1938 with gas from neighboring Goyle. In 1940 a lime factory was put into operation, which operated until 1982, and in 1955 a clay factory was built, which still offers a wide range of goods for many industries: from oil and food to foundry, construction and agriculture, especially livestock (feed additives). These plants operated under the name "Methane" and for a short time as the "Chemical Products Plant". Since 1943, there has been a project to build a low-capacity mineral fertilizer plant. In 1968, within the petrochemical plant in the eastern part of Kutina, a fertilizer plant was built, the largest in the production system of the Kutina petrochemical industry. In the same year, the plant with a capacity of 750,000 tons entered the top ten in the world. On 1 June 1968, the plant of mineral fertilizers merged with the plant of chemical products (carbon black, limestone, alumina). Since 1970, the plant called INA-Petrokemija has become one of the four newly created technological and functional divisions of INA. The company was privatised in the late 1990s, and in 1998 was registered as an independent joint stock company and listed on the Zagreb Stock Exchange, becoming one of 24 companies included in the CROBEX stock index.
