= Stryjno-Kolonia =

- Village
- Location within Poland
- Coordinates: 51°3′53″N 22°50′29″E
- Country: Poland
- Voivodeship: Lublin
- County: Świdnik
- Gmina: Rybczewice

Stryjno-Kolonia [ˈstrɨi̯nɔ kɔˈlɔɲa] is a village in the administrative district of Gmina Rybczewice, within Świdnik County, Lublin Voivodeship, in eastern Poland.
