= Bystrzejowice A =

- Village
- Location within Poland
- Coordinates: 51°9′31″N 22°45′34″E
- Country: Poland
- Voivodeship: Lublin
- County: Świdnik
- Gmina: Piaski
- Population: 750

Bystrzejowice A is a village in the administrative district of Gmina Piaski, within Świdnik County, Lublin Voivodeship, in eastern Poland.
