= Biskupice, Lublin Voivodeship =

Biskupice
- Village
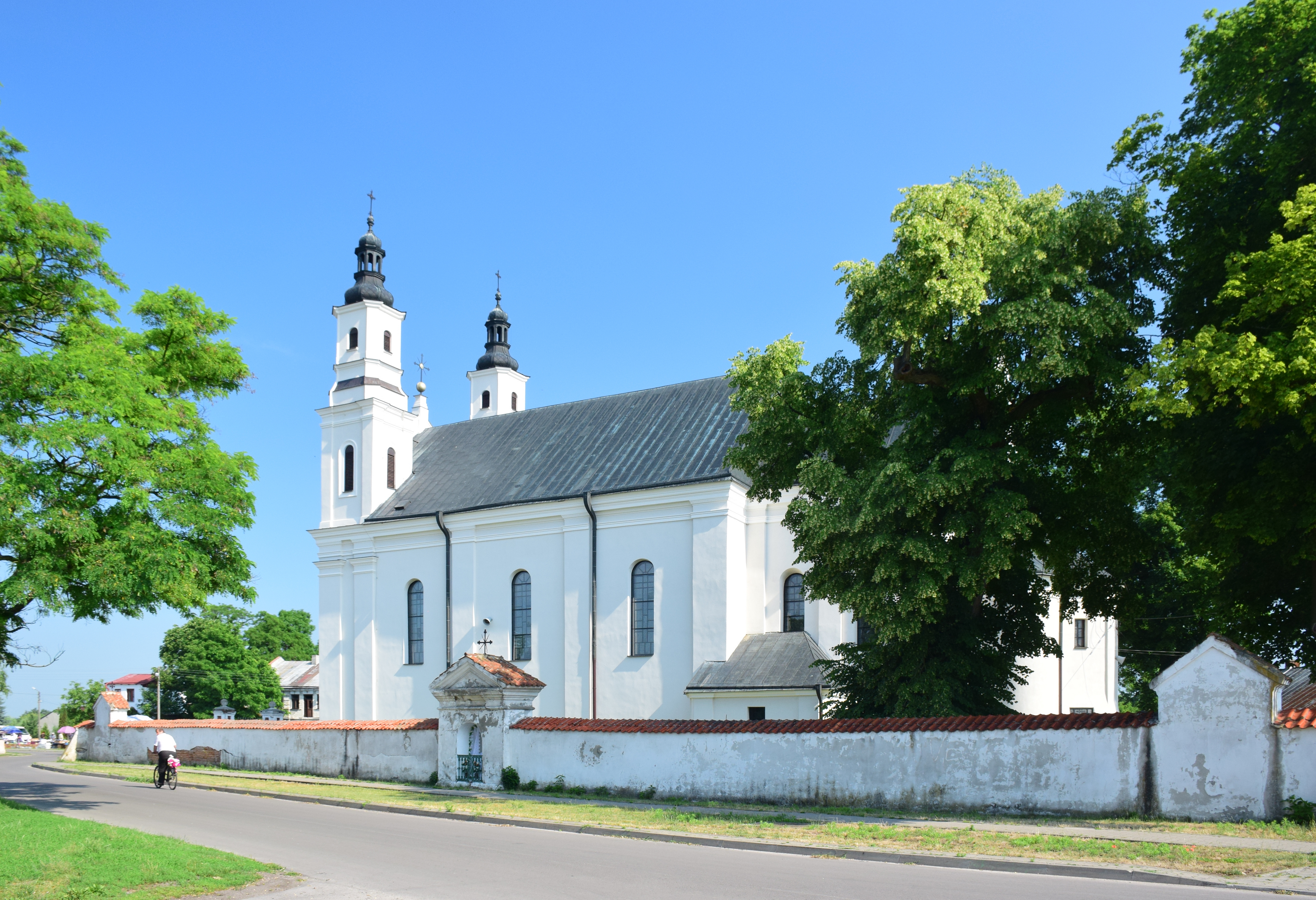
- Baroque Church of St. Stanislaus in Biskupice

- Location within Poland
- Coordinates: 51°8′N 22°57′E
- Country: Poland
- Voivodeship: Lublin
- County: Świdnik
- Gmina: Trawniki

Population
  - Total: 890
- Time zone: UTC+1 (CET)
  - Summer (DST): UTC+2 (CEST)
- Vehicle registration: LSW

Biskupice [biskuˈpit͡sɛ] is a village in the administrative district of Gmina Trawniki, within Świdnik County, Lublin Voivodeship, in eastern Poland.

The village has a current population of 890.

== History ==
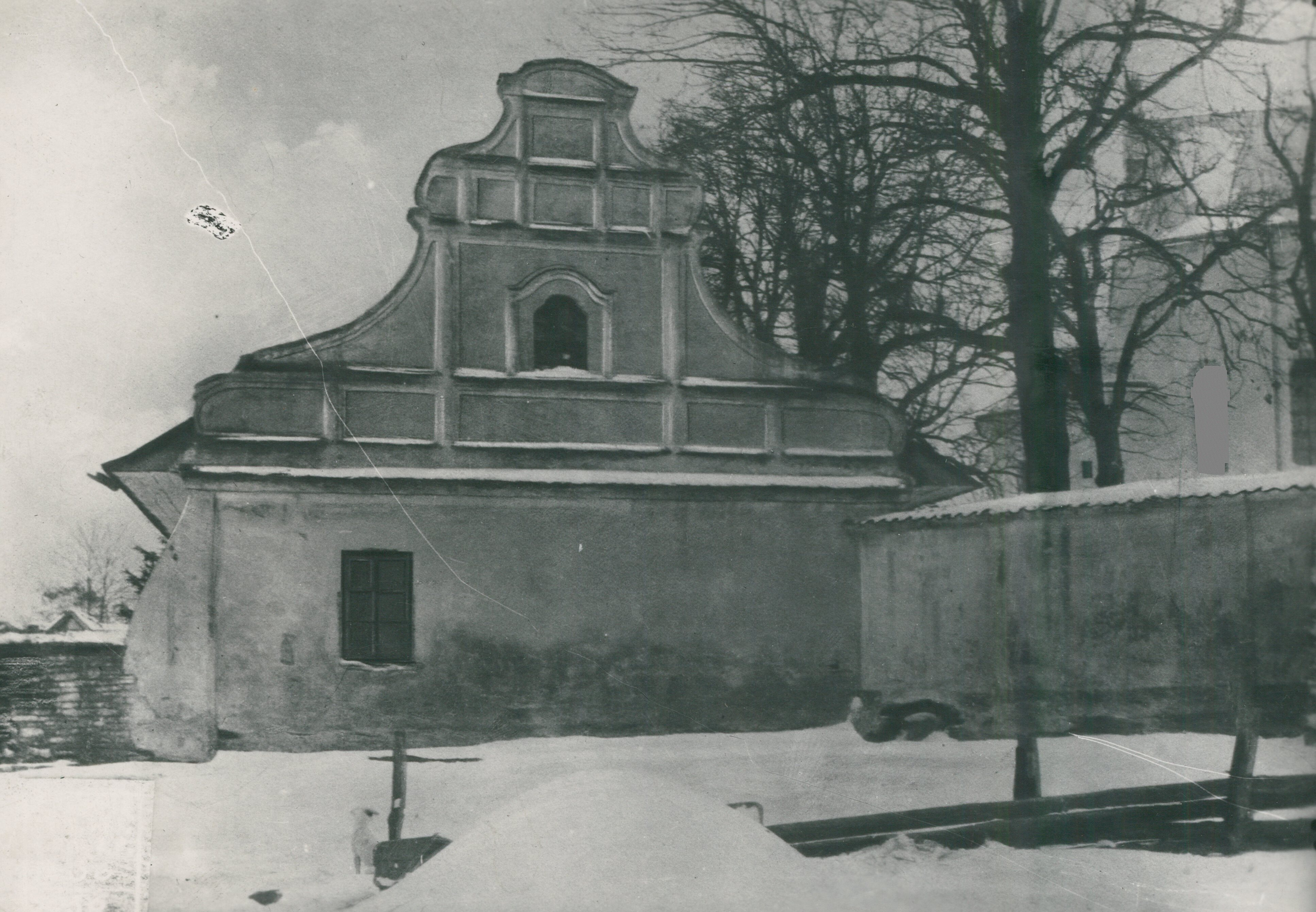
Rectory in Biskupice before 1916

Biskupice was possibly founded by Zbigniew Oleśnicki, cardinal and Bishop of Kraków, in the early 15th century. The name comes from the Polish word Biskup, which means "Bishop". In 1444, Cardinal Oleśnicki established a Catholic parish in Biskupice. Biskupice was granted town rights in 1450.

In 1921, there was a Jewish population of 129 people.

Following the German-Soviet invasion of Poland, which started World War II in September 1939, Biskupice was occupied by Germany until 1944. During the Holocaust, the Jewish population suffered tremendously. A group of 120 to 200 Jews from Kraków were sent to Biskupice. In February 1942 a transport of 600 Jews was directed to the Bełżec extermination camp. Other Jews in the ghetto apparently were sent to Majdanek. The Jewish community ceased to exist after March 1942.
