= Kolonia Kębłów =

- Village
- Location within Poland
- Coordinates: 51°8′39″N 22°48′49″E
- Country: Poland
- Voivodeship: Lublin
- County: Świdnik
- Gmina: Piaski
- Population: 340

Kolonia Kębłów [kɔˈlɔɲa ˈkɛmbwuf] is a village in the administrative district of Gmina Piaski, within Świdnik County, Lublin Voivodeship, in eastern Poland.
