= Zygmuntów, Lublin Voivodeship =

Zygmuntów
- Village
- Location within Poland
- Coordinates: 50°59′N 22°54′E
- Country: Poland
- Voivodeship: Lublin
- County: Świdnik
- Gmina: Rybczewice

Zygmuntów [zɨɡˈmuntuf] is a village in the administrative district of Gmina Rybczewice, within Świdnik County, Lublin Voivodeship, in eastern Poland.
