= Majdan Siostrzytowski =

- Village
- Location within Poland
- Coordinates: 51°10′46″N 23°1′25″E
- Country: Poland
- Voivodeship: Lublin
- County: Świdnik
- Gmina: Trawniki

Majdan Siostrzytowski (Polish pronunciation: [ˈmajdan ɕɔstʂɨˈtɔfskʲi]) is a village in the administrative district of Gmina Trawniki, within Świdnik County, Lublin Voivodeship, in eastern Poland.
