= Kawęczyn, Świdnik County =

Kawęczyn
- Village
- Location within Poland
- Coordinates: 51°9′N 22°46′E
- Country: Poland
- Voivodeship: Lublin
- County: Świdnik
- Gmina: Piaski
- Population: 350

Kawęczyn [kaˈvɛnt͡ʂɨn] is a village in the administrative district of Gmina Piaski, within Świdnik County, Lublin Voivodeship, in eastern Poland.
