= Marysin, Świdnik County =

Marysin
- Village
- Location within Poland
- Coordinates: 51°07′50″N 22°44′49″E
- Country: Poland
- Voivodeship: Lublin
- County: Świdnik
- Gmina: Piaski

Marysin [maˈrɨɕin] is a village in the administrative district of Gmina Piaski, within Świdnik County, Lublin Voivodeship, in eastern Poland.
