= Piaski, Świdnik County =

Town in Lublin Voivodeship, Poland

Piaski
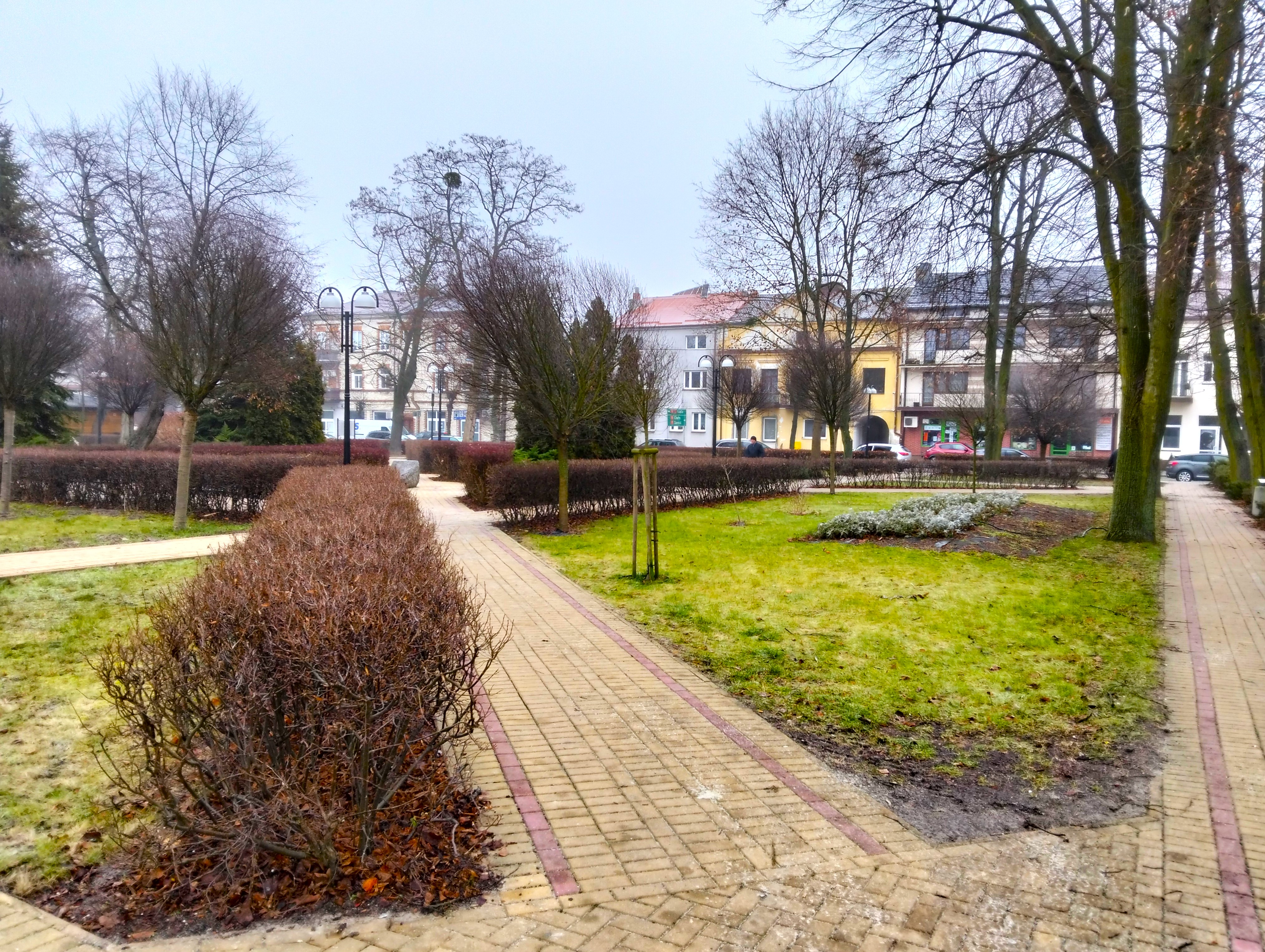
- Market Square in Piaski

- Coat of arms

- Location within Poland
- Coordinates: 51°8′3″N 22°50′41″E
- Country: Poland
- Voivodeship: Lublin
- County: Świdnik
- Gmina: Piaski
- First mentioned: 1401
- Town rights: 15th century

Government
  - Mayor: Michał Cholewa

Area
  - Total: 8.43 km^{2} (3.25 sq mi)

Population (2006)
  - Total: 2,626
  - Density: 312/km^{2} (807/sq mi)
- Time zone: UTC+1 (CET)
  - Summer (DST): UTC+2 (CEST)
- Postal code: 21-050
- Car plates: LSW
- Website: www.piaski.pl%20www.piaski.pl

Piaski (Polish: [ˈpjaskʲi]), formerly Piaski Luterskie, is a town in Poland at the Giełczew river. The town's population is about 2,660 (2004). Administratively it belongs to Świdnik County of the Lublin Voivodeship.

== History ==
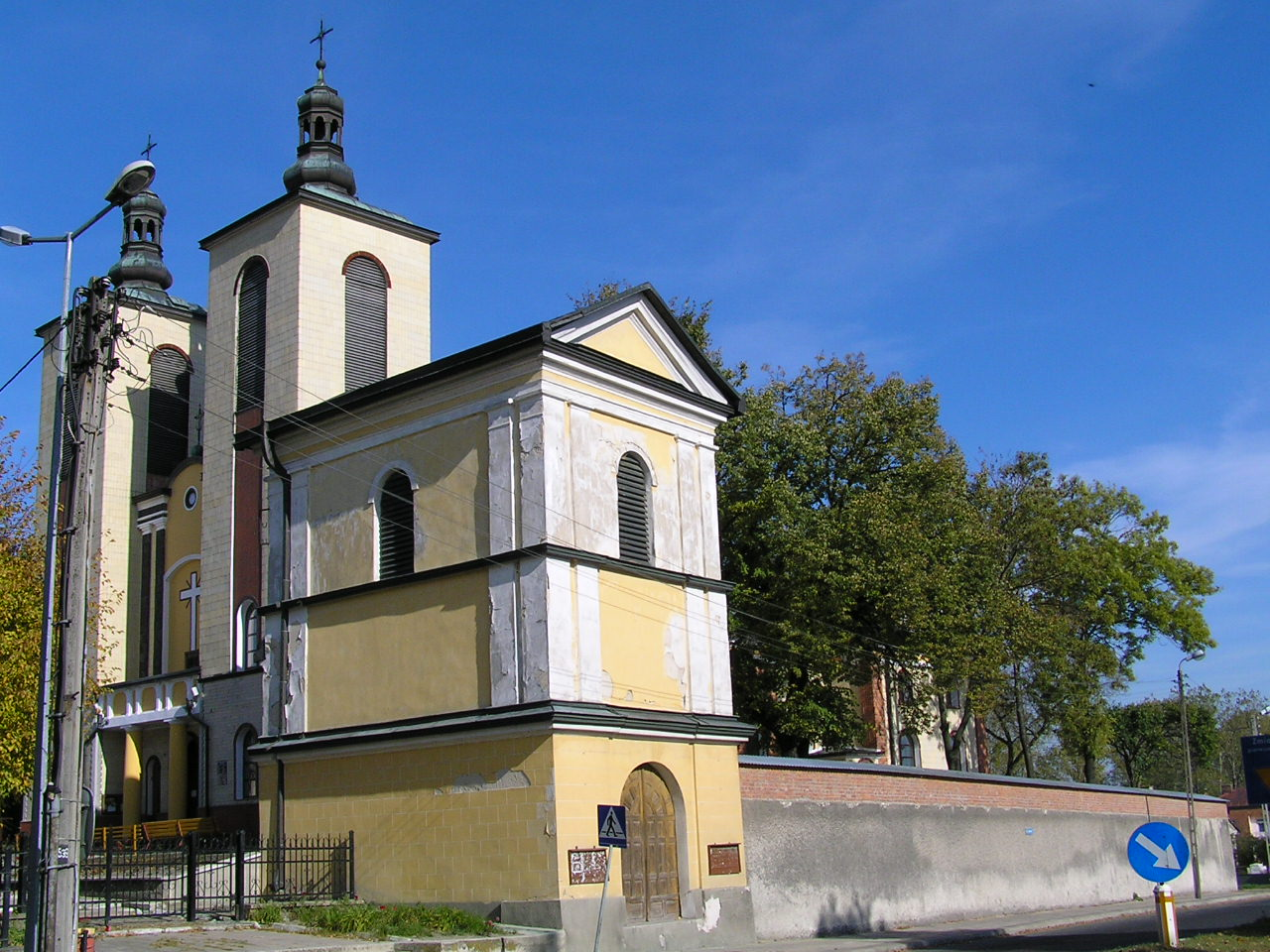
Exaltation of the Holy Cross church

The first mention of the village located near the site of the current town and called Pogorzały Staw comes from the 1401 document. The first specific mention of Piaski occurs in the Latin chronicle of Jan Długosz from 1470 which calls the town "Pyassek alias Gyelczew" (alias here meaning formerly), where Giełczew is the name of another local village. Based on this evidence, it is thought that the town of Piaski came into existence some time in the first half of the 15th century on the lands formerly belonging to those two villages. Administratively, Piaski was located in the Lublin Voivodeship in the Lesser Poland Province of the Polish Crown. In 1509 Polish King Sigismund I the Old established two annual fairs in Piaski, as well as weekly markets. As a result of the Reformation, in the 16th century, apart from the Catholic church, there were three Protestant churches in the town: Calvinist, Arian, and Lutheran. In the 16th and 17th centuries a significant part of the town's population was Protestant, hence it became known as Piaski Luterskie (Lutheran).

In 1795 during the Third Partition of Poland, the town became part of Habsburg Austria. Following the Austro-Polish War of 1809, it passed to the short-lived Polish Duchy of Warsaw, before becoming part of Congress Poland under Russian rule from 1815 onward. The town saw a significant influx of Jewish settlers as a result of Russian discriminatory policies, and the Jewish community grew to eventually constitute two thirds of the town's population. In 1869 Piaski lost its municipal rights as punishment for the January Uprising. After World War I, since 1918 it has belonged to reconstituted sovereign Poland, and then Polish cultural life was revived. After the Polish decisive victory in the Battle of Warsaw (1920) against the invading Russians, the Polish Riflemen's Association was established for local youth. Its pupils later joined the Polish underground resistance movement, including the Home Army, during the German occupation of Poland in World War II. According to the 1921 census, the town had a population of 3,974, 67.1% Jewish and 32.8% Polish.

=== World War II ===
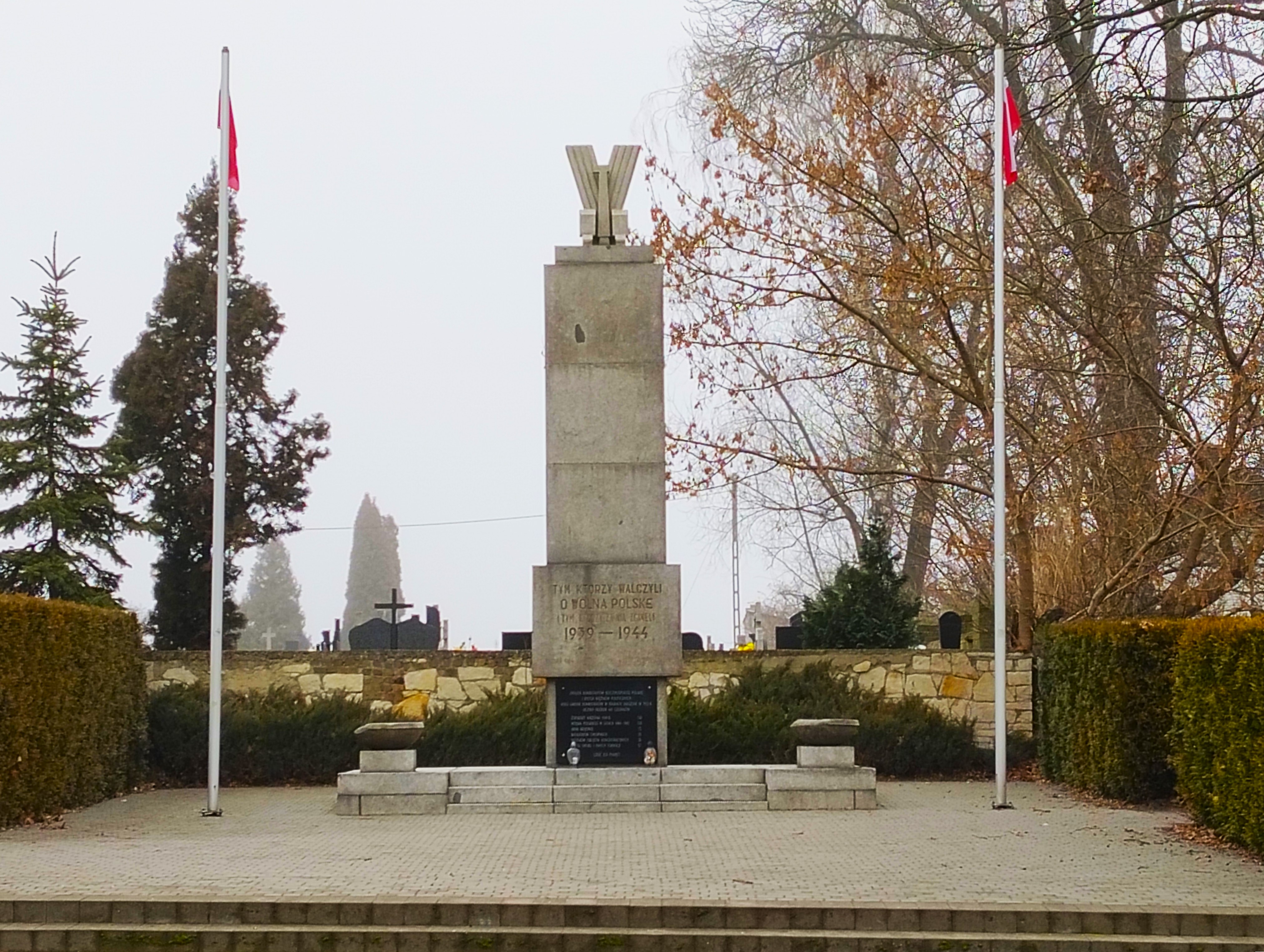
World War II memorial

During the invasion of Poland, which started World War II, Germany raided the town four times in September 1939. A dozen or so people were killed, and many buildings were destroyed, however, thanks to firefighters and civil defense the damage was limited. The town was flooded by refugees fleeing the western regions of Poland after the German invasion.

During the German occupation of Poland, the town became part of the semi-colonial General Government, established by the Nazi German regime in central Poland. At the beginning of this period, 4,165 Jews resided in Piaski. After the brief Soviet occupation in September 1939, many Jews fled east with the Soviet army. In 1940 the Nazi German occupiers established the Piaski ghetto, to imprison not only its Jewish inhabitants, but also several thousand Jews transported from the Lublin Ghetto, Germany and German-occupied Czechia. In addition to housing Piaski Jews, Piaski was a transit ghetto where thousands of Jews were located on their way to the death at the nearby Bełżec extermination camp. Severe overcrowding, hunger, and the lack of a secure water supply and sanitation led to a typhus epidemic in late 1941 that killed as many as 1500 ghetto residents. In early 1942, thousands of Jews were marched to nearby Trawniki and many died there en route to Belzec. The Polish underground resistance movement organized secret help for Jews through the council to Aid Jews, better known as Żegota.

In the second half of 1942, remaining Piaski Jews were taken to Trawniki and then by Holocaust trains to the Sobibor extermination camp where they were immediately murdered. The liquidation of the ghetto was aided by the Reserve Police Battalion 101 from Hamburg. The number of Piaski Jews who survived is unknown, but the Jewish community ceased to exist. After the war, the Podsiadło and Jarosz families were acknowledged for their help for Jews and named Righteous Among the Nations by Yad Vashem. The Posiadłys for protecting Kurt Ticho Thomas who had escaped from Sobibor, and the Jarosz family, whose members were part of the Polish underground resistance, for helping several Jews in various ways.

=== Recent period ===
In 1993 Piaski recovered its municipal rights, officially becoming a town again after a break of over a hundred years.

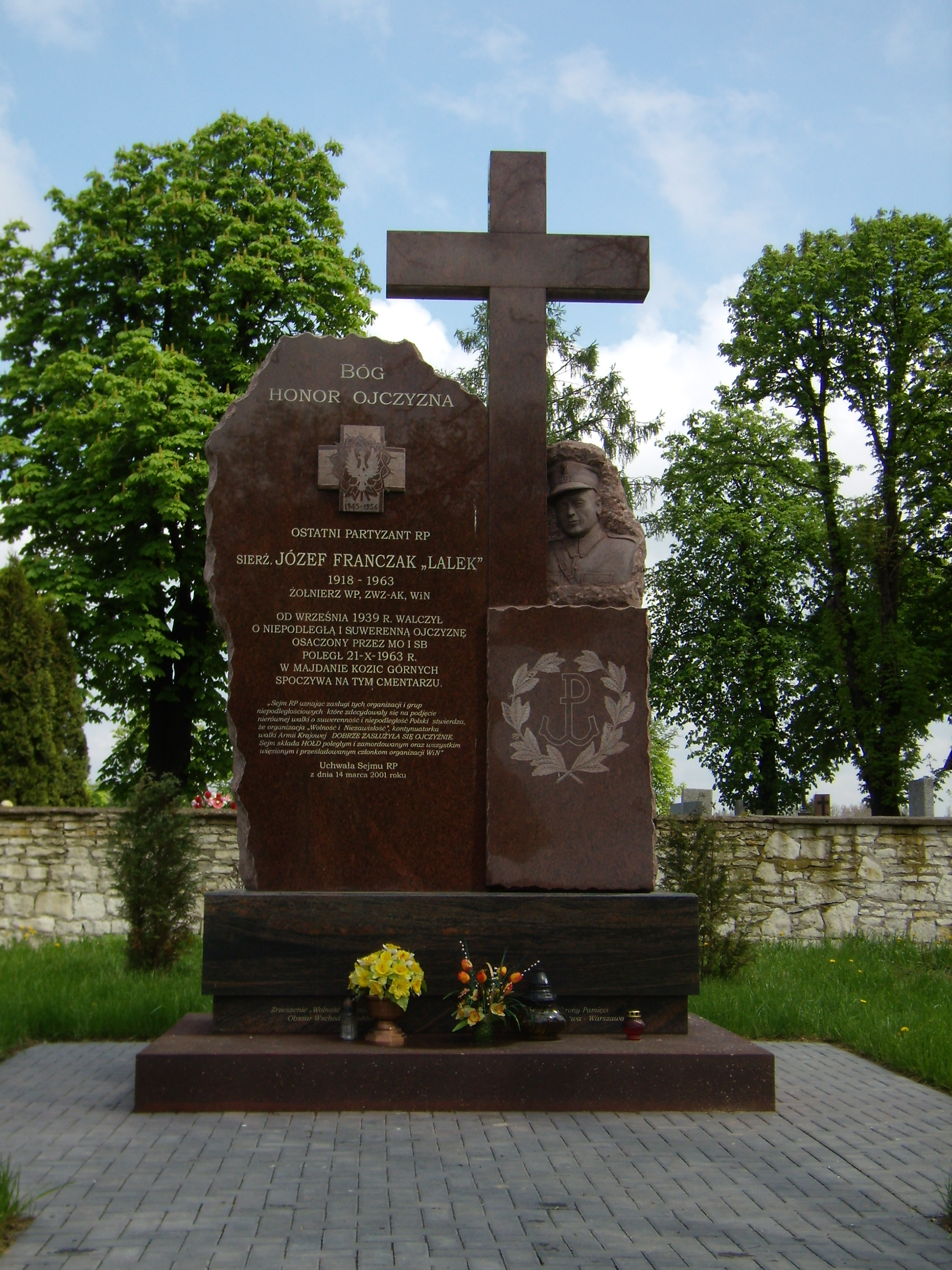
Monument to partisan Józef Franczak

In 2007 a monument to Józef Franczak, the last partisan of the anti-communist resistance in Poland, who is buried at the local cemetery, was unveiled in Piaski.

== Facilities ==
Near Piaski there is a TV transmission site, with a 342-metre-high (1,122 ft) guyed mast, one of the tallest in Poland.

== Sports ==
The main sports club of the town is Piaskovia Piaski with football, volleyball and table tennis sections.

== Notable people ==
- Antoni Patek (1812–1877), Polish watchmaker, co-founder of Patek Philippe, November Uprising participant
- Marcin Świetlicki (born 1961), Polish poet, writer, and musician
- Andrzej Zaorski (born 1942), Polish actor and cabaret artist

== Bibliography ==
- Browning, Christopher R. (2001). "Arrival in Poland". Ordinary Men: Reserve Police Battalion 101 and the Final Solution in Poland (PDF). United Kingdom: Penguin Books. p. 49. ISBN 9780141000428. OCLC 838611906. Archived from the original (PDF file, direct download 7.91 MB) on 2013-10-19.
- "Official webpage: Town History" (in Polish). Urząd Miejski w Piaskach. 27 February 2013.
- "The Piaski Ghetto. Town history". Survivors, Rabbis of Piaski, Righteous Gentiles. Remember Jewish Piaski - Genealogy Group. 2014. With selection of period photographs, list of references and relevant weblinks.
- Dane Głównego Urzędu Statystycznego: Ludność. Stan i struktura w przekroju terytorialnym. Stan w dniu 31 XII 2008 r.
