= Wola Piasecka =

- Village
- Location within Poland
- Coordinates: 51°8′N 22°49′E
- Country: Poland
- Voivodeship: Lublin
- County: Świdnik
- Gmina: Piaski
- Time zone: UTC+1 (CET)
  - Summer (DST): UTC+2 (CEST)

Wola Piasecka [ˈvɔla pjaˈsɛt͡ska] is a village in the administrative district of Gmina Piaski, within Świdnik County, Lublin Voivodeship, in eastern Poland.

== History ==
Six Polish citizens were murdered by Nazi Germany in the village during World War II.
