= Wierzchowiska Drugie =

Wierzchowiska Drugie may refer to the following places:

- Wierzchowiska Drugie, Janów County in Lublin Voivodeship (east Poland)
- Wierzchowiska Drugie, Świdnik County in Lublin Voivodeship (east Poland)
- Wierzchowiska Drugie, Masovian Voivodeship (east-central Poland)
