= Rybczewice Pierwsze =

- Village
- Location within Poland
- Coordinates: 51°02′17″N 22°51′38″E
- Country: Poland
- Voivodeship: Lublin
- County: Świdnik
- Gmina: Rybczewice

Rybczewice Pierwsze [rɨpt͡ʂɛˈvit͡sɛ ˈpjɛrfʂɛ] is a village in the administrative district of Gmina Rybczewice, within Świdnik County, Lublin Voivodeship, in eastern Poland.
