= Częstoborowice =

- Village
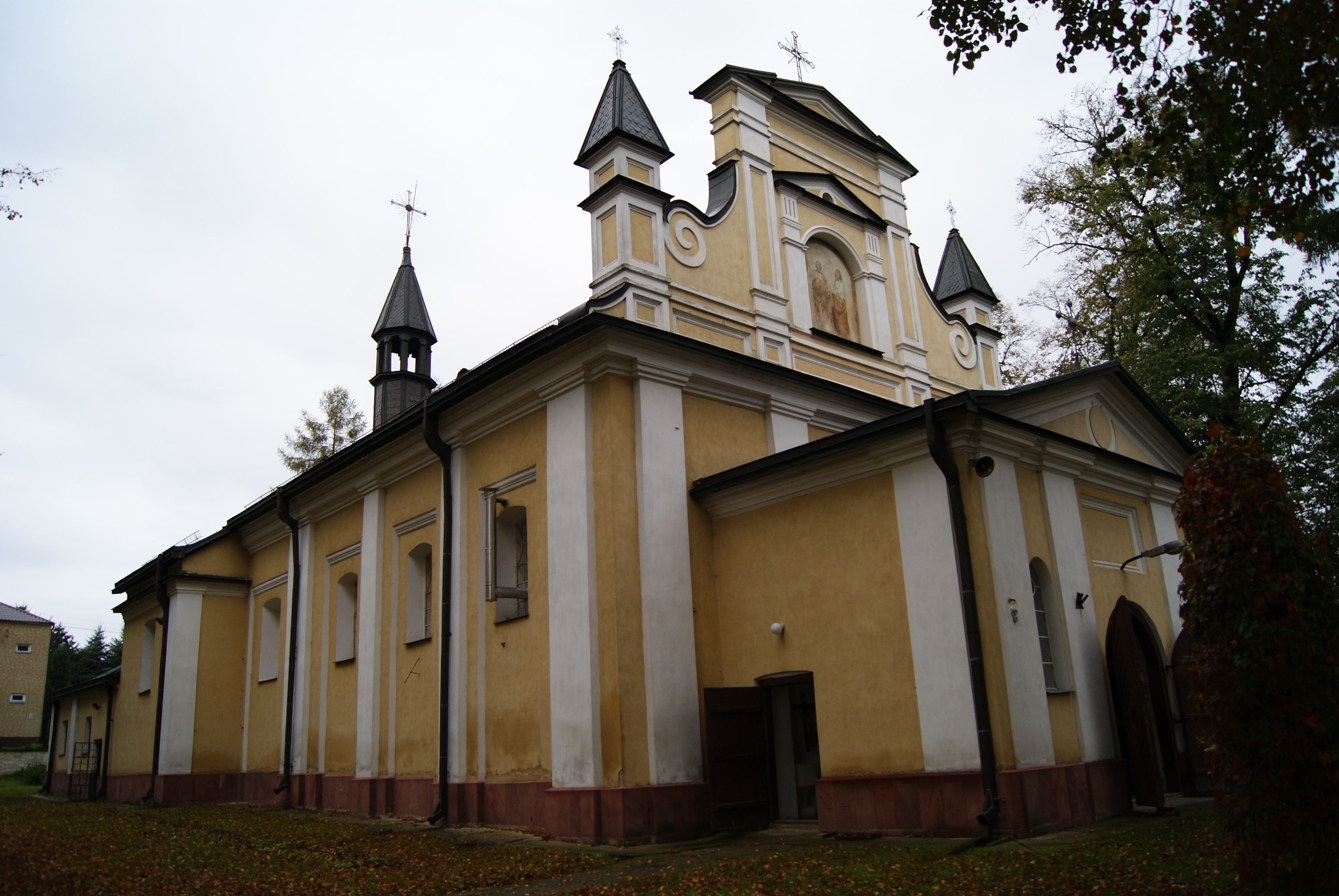
- Saints Peter and Paul Church in Częstoborowice

- Location within Poland
- Coordinates: 51°1′N 22°52′E
- Country: Poland
- Voivodeship: Lublin
- County: Świdnik
- Gmina: Rybczewice
- Time zone: UTC+1 (CET)
  - Summer (DST): UTC+2 (CEST)

Częstoborowice [t͡ʂɛ̃stɔbɔrɔˈvit͡sɛ] is a village in the administrative district of Gmina Rybczewice, within Świdnik County, Lublin Voivodeship, in eastern Poland.

== History ==
Nine Polish citizens were murdered by Nazi Germany in the village during World War II.
