= Struża-Kolonia =

- Village
- Location within Poland
- Coordinates: 51°9′N 22°56′E
- Country: Poland
- Voivodeship: Lublin
- County: Świdnik
- Gmina: Trawniki
- Population: 760

Struża-Kolonia [ˈstruʐa kɔˈlɔɲa] is a village in the administrative district of Gmina Trawniki, within Świdnik County, Lublin Voivodeship, in eastern Poland.
