= Bazar, Lublin Voivodeship =

Bazar
- Village
- Location within Poland
- Coordinates: 50°59′42″N 22°51′8″E
- Country: Poland
- Voivodeship: Lublin
- County: Świdnik
- Gmina: Rybczewice

Bazar [ˈbazar] is a village in the administrative district of Gmina Rybczewice, within Świdnik County, Lublin Voivodeship, in eastern Poland.
