= Stefanówka, Świdnik County =

Stefanówka
- Village
- Location within Poland
- Coordinates: 51°05′24″N 22°47′55″E
- Country: Poland
- Voivodeship: Lublin
- County: Świdnik
- Gmina: Piaski

Stefanówka [stɛfaˈnufka] is a village in the administrative district of Gmina Piaski, within Świdnik County, Lublin Voivodeship, in eastern Poland.
