= Powiat świdnicki =

Powiat świdnicki may refer to either of two counties (powiats) in Poland:

- Świdnica County, in Lower Silesian Voivodeship (SW Poland)
- Świdnik County, in Lublin Voivodeship (E Poland)
