= Stryjno Pierwsze =

- Village
- Location within Poland
- Coordinates: 51°4′3″N 22°49′54″E
- Country: Poland
- Voivodeship: Lublin
- County: Świdnik
- Gmina: Rybczewice
- Population: 320

Stryjno Pierwsze [ˈstrɨi̯nɔ ˈpjɛrfʂɛ] is a village in the administrative district of Gmina Rybczewice, within Świdnik County, Lublin Voivodeship, in eastern Poland.
