= Pełczyn, Lublin Voivodeship =

Pełczyn
- Village
- Location within Poland
- Coordinates: 51°10′N 22°59′E
- Country: Poland
- Voivodeship: Lublin
- County: Świdnik
- Gmina: Trawniki
- Time zone: UTC+1 (CET)
  - Summer (DST): UTC+2 (CEST)

Pełczyn [ˈpɛu̯t͡ʂɨn] is a village in the administrative district of Gmina Trawniki, within Świdnik County, Lublin Voivodeship, in eastern Poland.

== History ==
Six Polish citizens were murdered by Nazi Germany in the village during World War II.
