= Stryjno Drugie =

- Village
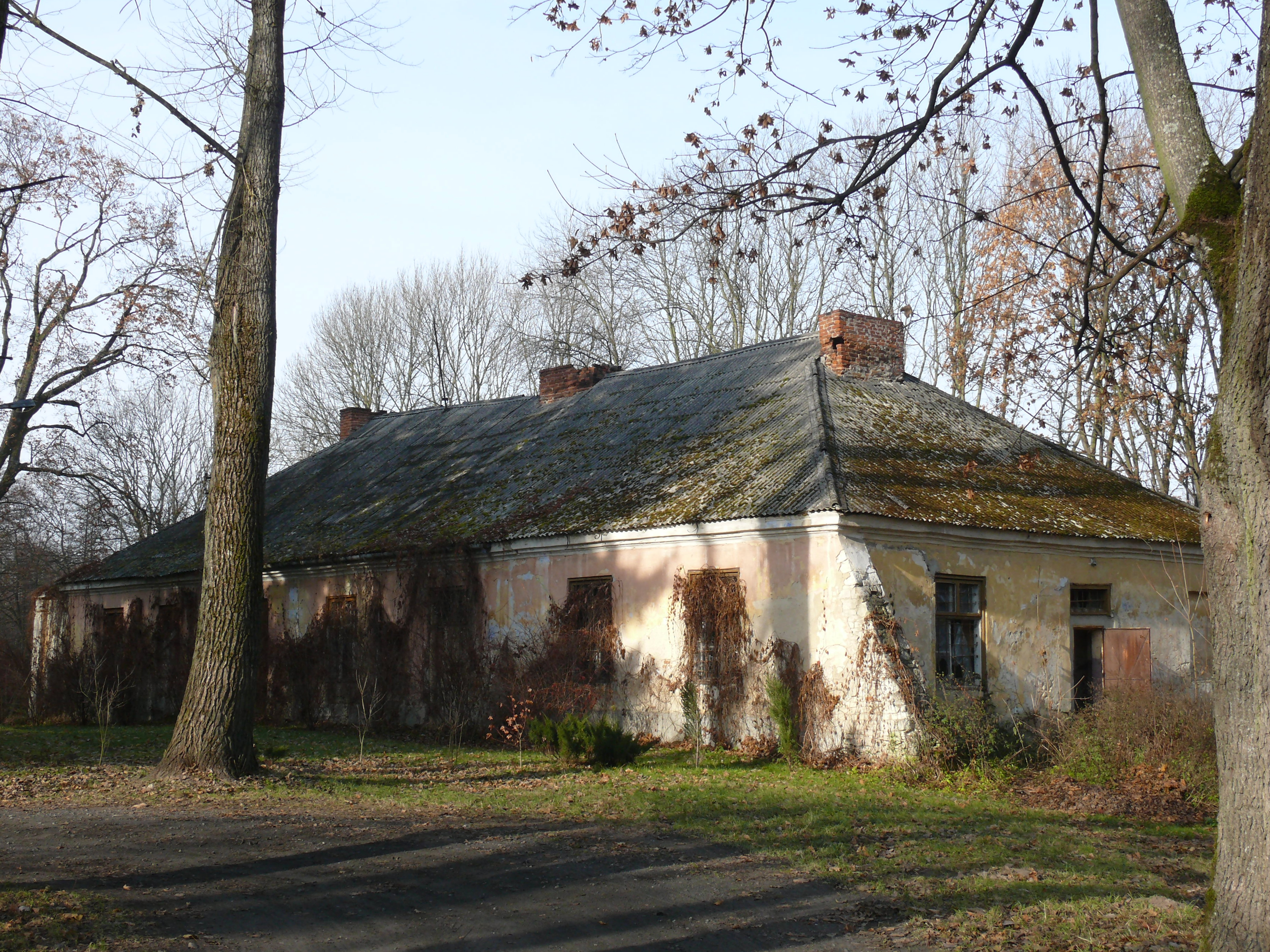

- Location within Poland
- Coordinates: 51°03′41″N 22°49′14″E
- Country: Poland
- Voivodeship: Lublin
- County: Świdnik
- Gmina: Rybczewice

Stryjno Drugie [ˈstrɨi̯nɔ ˈdruɡʲɛ] is a village in the administrative district of Gmina Rybczewice, within Świdnik County, Lublin Voivodeship, in eastern Poland.

== See also ==
- Bujanica
