= Józefów, Gmina Piaski =

Józefów
- Village
- Location within Poland
- Coordinates: 51°10′16″N 22°50′22″E
- Country: Poland
- Voivodeship: Lublin
- County: Świdnik
- Gmina: Piaski

Józefów (Polish pronunciation: [juˈzɛfuf]) is a village in the administrative district of Gmina Piaski, within Świdnik County, Lublin Voivodeship, in eastern Poland.
