= Gardzienice Drugie =

- Village
- Location within Poland
- Coordinates: 51°6′38″N 22°51′31″E
- Country: Poland
- Voivodeship: Lublin
- County: Świdnik
- Gmina: Piaski
- Population: 620

Gardzienice Drugie [ɡard͡ʑɛˈnit͡sɛ ˈdruɡʲɛ] is a village in the administrative district of Gmina Piaski, within Świdnik County, Lublin Voivodeship, in eastern Poland.
