= Brzezice Pierwsze =

- Village
- Location within Poland
- Coordinates: 51°09′04″N 22°53′17″E
- Country: Poland
- Voivodeship: Lublin
- County: Świdnik
- Gmina: Piaski

Brzezice Pierwsze [bʐɛˈʑit͡sɛ ˈpjɛrfʂɛ] is a village in the administrative district of Gmina Piaski, within Świdnik County, Lublin Voivodeship, in eastern Poland.
