= Bonow =

Bonow is a Low German surname. Notable people with the surname include:

- Amelia Bonow (born 1984), an American abortion rights activist
- Robert Bonow, an American cardiologist
- Tilo Bonow (born 1980), a German tech investor and entrepreneur

== See also ==
- Bonów, Lublin Voivodeship, Poland
- Bonów, Lubusz Voivodeship Poland
