= Piaski Górne =

- Village
- Location within Poland
- Coordinates: 51°09′56″N 22°50′41″E
- Country: Poland
- Voivodeship: Lublin
- County: Świdnik
- Gmina: Piaski

Piaski Górne (Polish pronunciation: [ˈpjaskʲi ˈɡurnɛ]) is a village in the administrative district of Gmina Piaski, within Świdnik County, Lublin Voivodeship, in eastern Poland.
