= Młodziejów =

- Village
- Location within Poland
- Coordinates: 51°7′N 22°53′E
- Country: Poland
- Voivodeship: Lublin
- County: Świdnik
- Gmina: Piaski

Młodziejów [mwɔˈd͡ʑɛjuf] is a village in the administrative district of Gmina Piaski, within Świdnik County, Lublin Voivodeship, in eastern Poland.
