= Giełczew, Świdnik County =

Giełczew
- Village
- Location within Poland
- Coordinates: 51°07′48″N 22°51′39″E
- Country: Poland
- Voivodeship: Lublin
- County: Świdnik
- Gmina: Piaski
- Population: 170

Giełczew [ˈɡʲɛu̯t͡ʂɛf] is a village in the administrative district of Gmina Piaski, within Świdnik County, Lublin Voivodeship, in eastern Poland.
