= Gmina Trawniki =

Gmina Trawniki Trawniki Commune
- Gmina
- Interactive map of Gmina Trawniki
- Coordinates (Trawniki): 51°7′55″N 23°0′9″E
- Country: Poland
- Voivodeship: Lublin
- County: Świdnik
- Seat: Trawniki

Area
  - Total: 84.16 km^{2} (32.49 sq mi)

Population (2015)
  - Total: 9,055
  - Density: 107.6/km^{2} (278.7/sq mi)
- Website: http://www.trawniki.pl

Gmina Trawniki is an upstate gmina (administrative district) in Świdnik County, Lublin Voivodeship, in eastern Poland. Its seat is the village of Trawniki, which lies approximately 24 kilometres (15 mi) south-east of Świdnik and 33 km (21 mi) south-east of the regional capital Lublin.

The gmina covers an area of 84.16 square kilometres (32.5 sq mi), and as of 2006 its total population is 9,211 (9,055 in 2015).

== Villages ==
Gmina Trawniki contains the villages and settlements of Biskupice, Bonów, Dorohucza, Ewopole, Majdan Siostrzytowski, Oleśniki, Pełczyn, Siostrzytów, Struża, Struża-Kolonia, Trawniki and Trawniki-Kolonia.

== Neighbouring gminas ==
Gmina Trawniki is bordered by the gminas of Fajsławice, Łopiennik Górny, Milejów, Piaski, Rejowiec Fabryczny and Siedliszcze.
