= Gmina Piaski, Lublin Voivodeship =

Gmina Piaski Piaski Commune
- Gmina
- Coat of arms
- Interactive map of Gmina Piaski
- Coordinates (Piaski): 51°8′3″N 22°50′41″E
- Country: Poland
- Voivodeship: Lublin
- County: Świdnik
- Seat: Piaski

Area
  - Total: 169.73 km^{2} (65.53 sq mi)

Population (2015)
  - Total: 10,563
  - Density: 62.234/km^{2} (161.19/sq mi)
  - Urban: 2,629
  - Rural: 7,934
- Website: http://www.piaski.pl

Gmina Piaski is an urban-rural gmina (administrative district) in Świdnik County, Lublin Voivodeship, in eastern Poland. Its seat is the town of Piaski, which lies approximately 14 kilometres (9 mi) south-east of Świdnik and 23 km (14 mi) south-east of the regional capital Lublin.

The gmina covers an area of 169.73 square kilometres (65.5 sq mi), and as of 2006 its total population is 10,759 (out of which the population of Piaski amounts to 2,626, and the population of the rural part of the gmina is 8,133).

== Villages ==
Apart from the town of Piaski, Gmina Piaski contains the villages and settlements of Borkowszczyzna, Brzezice, Brzezice Pierwsze, Brzeziczki, Bystrzejowice A, Bystrzejowice B, Bystrzejowice Pierwsze, Emilianów, Gardzienice Drugie, Gardzienice Pierwsze, Giełczew, Jadwisin, Janówek, Józefów, Kawęczyn, Kębłów, Klimusin, Kolonia Kębłów, Kolonia Siedliszczki, Kolonia Wola Piasecka, Kozice Dolne, Kozice Dolne-Kolonia, Kozice Górne, Majdan Brzezicki, Majdan Kawęczyński, Majdan Kozic Dolnych, Majdan Kozic Górnych, Majdanek Kozicki, Marysin, Młodziejów, Nowiny, Piaski Górne, Siedliszczki, Stefanówka, Wierzchowiska Drugie, Wierzchowiska Pierwsze, Wola Gardzienicka, Wola Piasecka and Żegotów.

== Neighbouring gminas ==
Gmina Piaski is bordered by the gminas of Fajsławice, Głusk, Jabłonna, Krzczonów, Mełgiew, Milejów, Rybczewice and Trawniki.
