= Kolonia Siedliszczki =

- Village
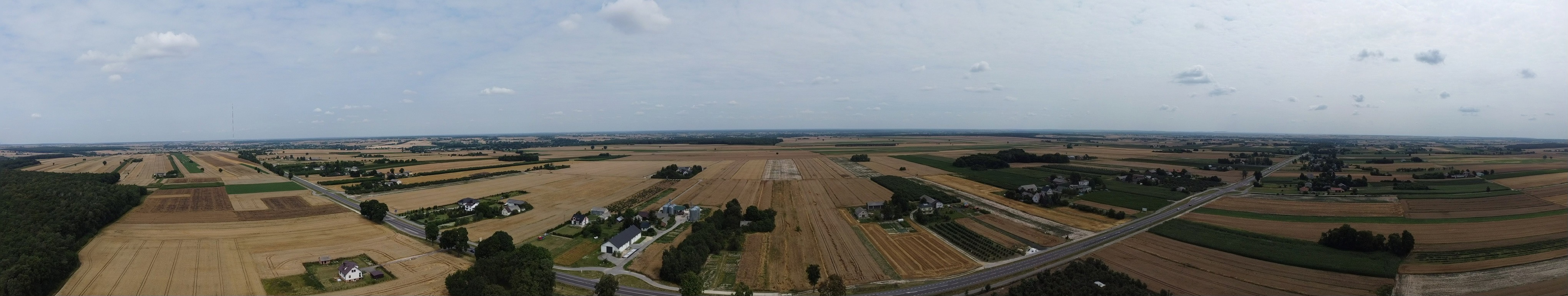

- Location within Poland
- Coordinates: 51°06′58″N 22°54′27″E
- Country: Poland
- Voivodeship: Lublin
- County: Świdnik
- Gmina: Piaski
- Time zone: UTC+1 (CET)
  - Summer (DST): UTC+2 (CEST)
- Vehicle registration: LSW

Kolonia Siedliszczki [kɔˈlɔɲa ɕɛˈdliʂt͡ʂki] is a village in the administrative district of Gmina Piaski, within Świdnik County, Lublin Voivodeship, in eastern Poland.
