= Pilaszkowice Pierwsze =

- Village
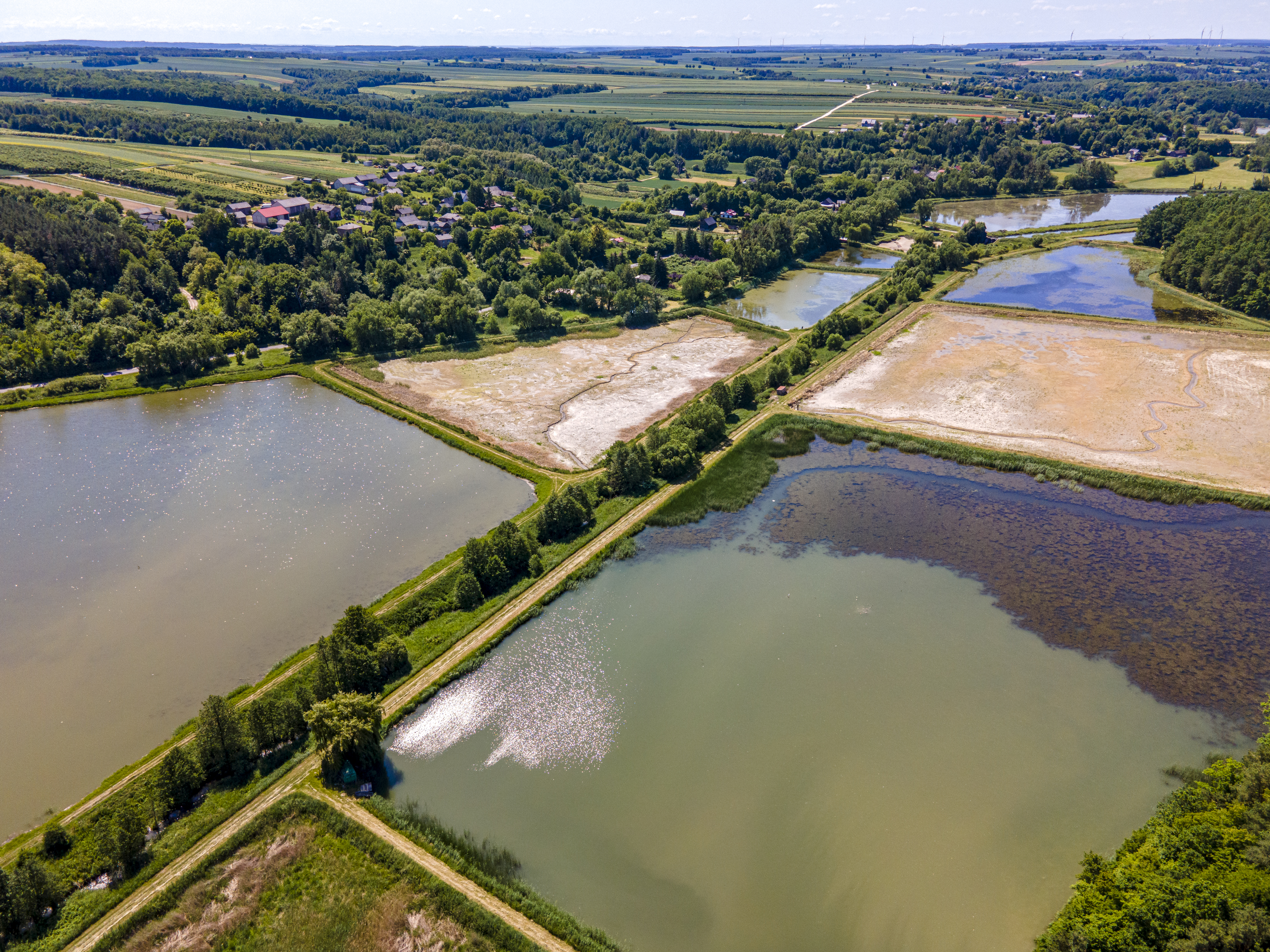
- Ponds in Pilaszkowice Pierwsze

- Location within Poland
- Coordinates: 50°59′N 22°51′E
- Country: Poland
- Voivodeship: Lublin
- County: Świdnik
- Gmina: Rybczewice
- Time zone: UTC+1 (CET)
  - Summer (DST): UTC+2 (CEST)
- Vehicle registration: LSW

Pilaszkowice Pierwsze [pilaʂkɔˈvit͡sɛ ˈpjɛrfʂɛ] is a village in the administrative district of Gmina Rybczewice, within Świdnik County, Lublin Voivodeship, in eastern Poland.
