= Izdebno-Kolonia, Lublin Voivodeship =

Izdebno-Kolonia
- Village
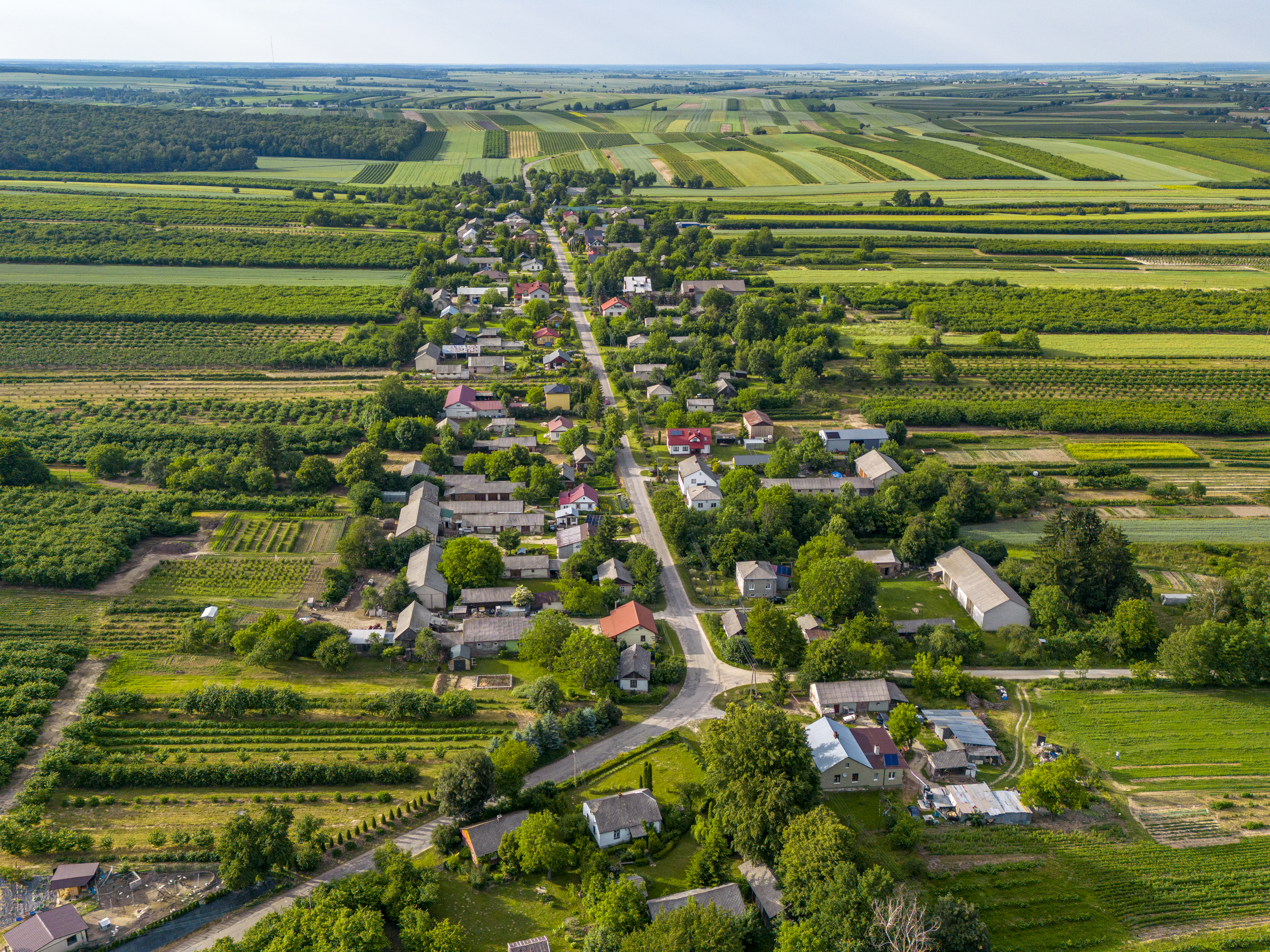
- Aerial view of Izdebno-Kolonia

- Location within Poland
- Coordinates: 51°0′33″N 22°55′42″E
- Country: Poland
- Voivodeship: Lublin
- County: Świdnik
- Gmina: Rybczewice
- Time zone: UTC+1 (CET)
  - Summer (DST): UTC+2 (CEST)
- Vehicle registration: LSW

Izdebno-Kolonia [izˈdɛbnɔ kɔˈlɔɲa] is a village in the administrative district of Gmina Rybczewice, within Świdnik County, Lublin Voivodeship, in eastern Poland.
