= Wierzchowiska Pierwsze, Świdnik County =

Wierzchowiska Pierwsze
- Village
- Location within Poland
- Coordinates: 51°10′57″N 22°45′32″E
- Country: Poland
- Voivodeship: Lublin
- County: Świdnik
- Gmina: Piaski

Wierzchowiska Pierwsze [vjɛʂxɔˈviska ˈpjɛrfʂɛ] is a village in the administrative district of Gmina Piaski, within Świdnik County, Lublin Voivodeship, in eastern Poland.
