= Gardzienice Pierwsze =

- Village
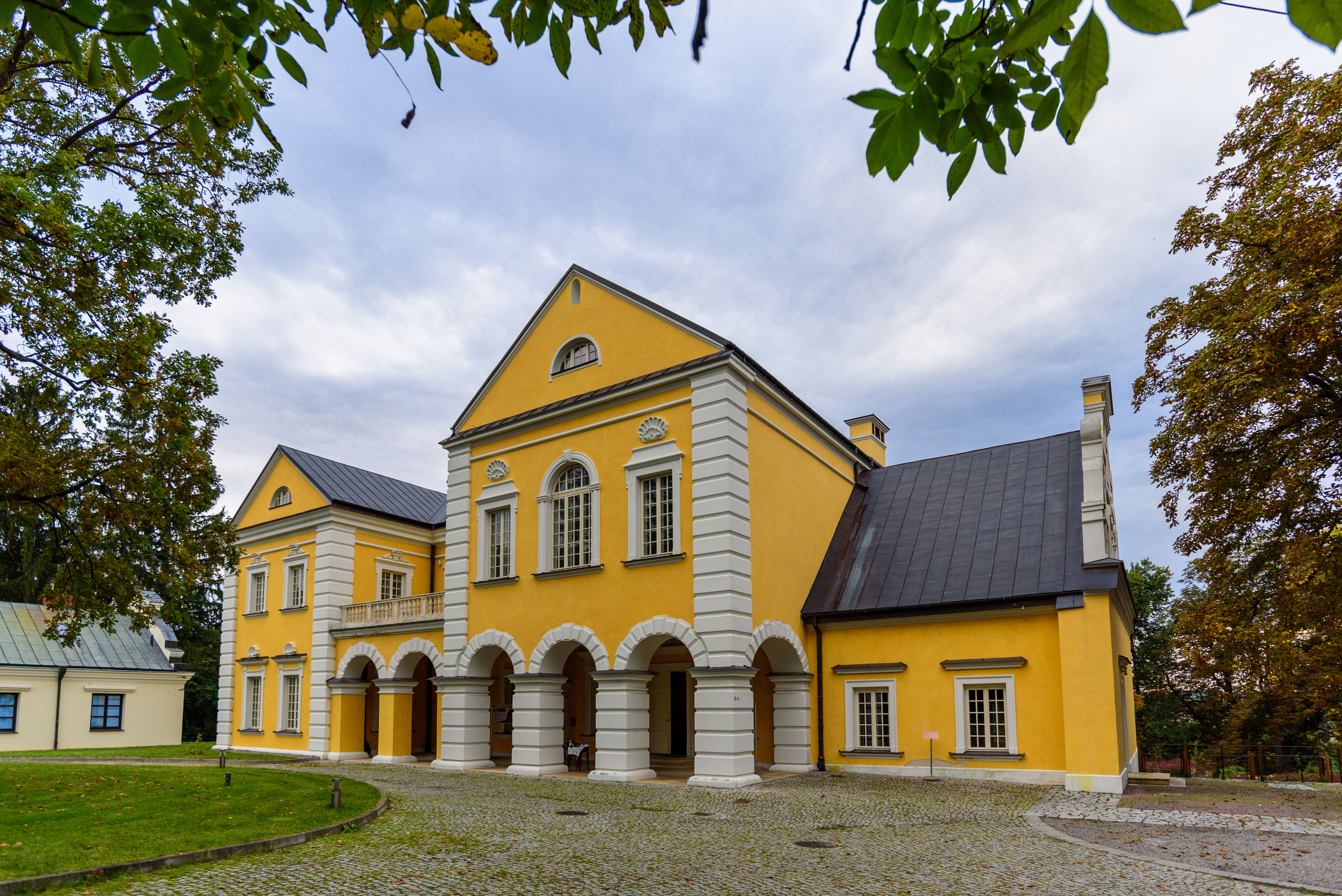
- Palace in Gardzienice Pierwsze

- Location within Poland
- Coordinates: 51°05′47″N 22°50′37″E
- Country: Poland
- Voivodeship: Lublin
- County: Świdnik
- Gmina: Piaski
- Time zone: UTC+1 (CET)
  - Summer (DST): UTC+2 (CEST)
- Vehicle registration: LSW

Gardzienice Pierwsze [ɡard͡ʑɛˈnit͡sɛ ˈpjɛrfʂɛ] is a village in the administrative district of Gmina Piaski, within Świdnik County, Lublin Voivodeship, in eastern Poland.
