= Wierzchowiska Drugie, Świdnik County =

Wierzchowiska Drugie
- Village
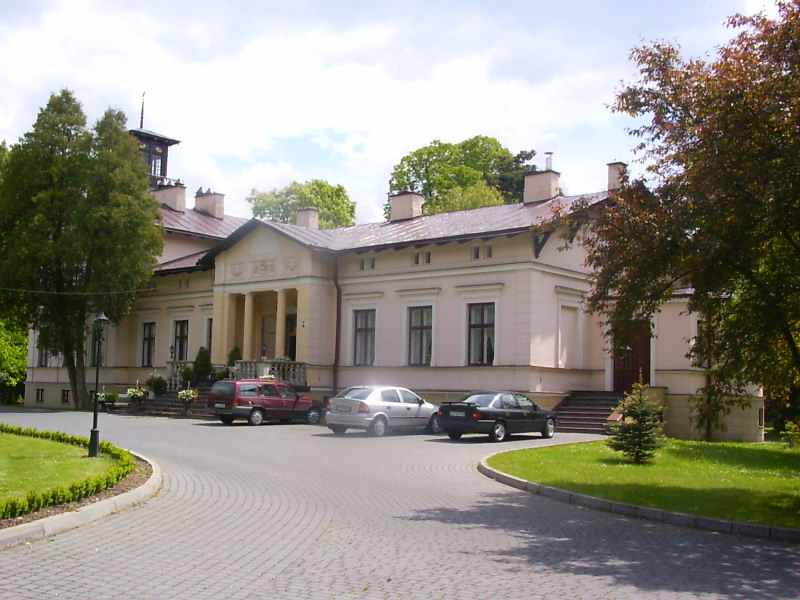

- Location within Poland
- Coordinates: 51°10′38″N 22°44′37″E
- Country: Poland
- Voivodeship: Lublin
- County: Świdnik
- Gmina: Piaski

Wierzchowiska Drugie [vjɛʂxɔˈviska ˈdruɡʲɛ] is a village in the administrative district of Gmina Piaski, within Świdnik County, Lublin Voivodeship, in eastern Poland.
