= Gmina Rybczewice =

Gmina Rybczewice Rybczewice Commune
- Gmina
- Coat of arms
- Interactive map of Gmina Rybczewice
- Coordinates (Rybczewice): 51°1′45″N 22°51′1″E
- Country: Poland
- Voivodeship: Lublin
- County: Świdnik
- Seat: Rybczewice

Area
  - Total: 99.09 km^{2} (38.26 sq mi)

Population (2015)
  - Total: 3,536
  - Density: 35.68/km^{2} (92.42/sq mi)
- Website: http://www.rybczewice.ug.gov.pl

Gmina Rybczewice is a rural gmina (administrative district) in Świdnik County, Lublin Voivodeship, in eastern Poland. Its seat is the village of Rybczewice, which lies approximately 24 kilometres (15 mi) south-east of Świdnik and 32 km (20 mi) south-east of the regional capital Lublin.

The gmina covers an area of 99.09 square kilometres (38.3 sq mi), and as of 2006 its total population is 3,931 (3,536).

== Villages ==
Gmina Rybczewice contains the villages and settlements of Bazar, Choiny, Częstoborowice, Izdebno, Izdebno-Kolonia, Pilaszkowice Drugie, Pilaszkowice Pierwsze, Podizdebno, Rybczewice, Rybczewice Pierwsze, Stryjno Drugie, Stryjno Pierwsze, Stryjno-Kolonia, Wygnanowice and Zygmuntów.

== Neighbouring gminas ==
Gmina Rybczewice is bordered by the gminas of Fajsławice, Gorzków, Krzczonów, Łopiennik Górny, Piaski and Żółkiewka.
