= Bonów, Lublin Voivodeship =

Bonów
- Village
- Location within Poland
- Coordinates: 51°10′40″N 22°56′46″E
- Country: Poland
- Voivodeship: Lublin
- County: Świdnik
- Gmina: Trawniki

Bonów [ˈbɔnuf] is a village in the administrative district of Gmina Trawniki, within Świdnik County, Lublin Voivodeship, in eastern Poland.
