= Rybczewice =

- Village
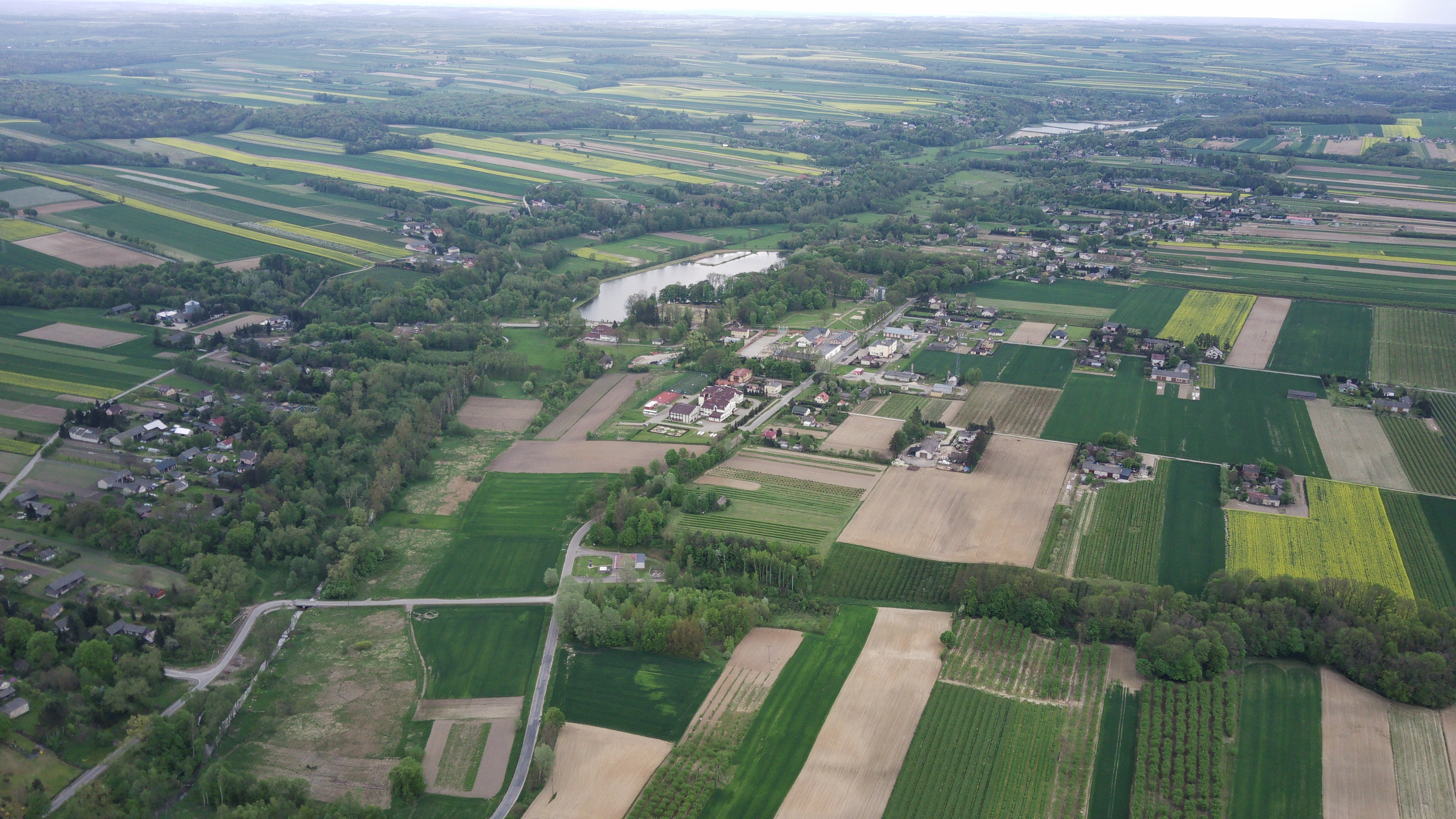
- Aerial view of Rybczewice

- Location within Poland
- Coordinates: 51°1′45″N 22°51′1″E
- Country: Poland
- Voivodeship: Lublin
- County: Świdnik
- Gmina: Rybczewice

Population
  - Total: 840
- Time zone: UTC+1 (CET)
  - Summer (DST): UTC+2 (CEST)

Rybczewice [rɨpt͡ʂɛˈvʲit͡sɛ] is a village in Świdnik County, Lublin Voivodeship, in eastern Poland. It is the seat of the gmina (administrative district) called Gmina Rybczewice.

== History ==
Ten Polish citizens were murdered by Nazi Germany in the village during World War II.
