= Bonów, Lubusz Voivodeship =

Bonów
- Village
- Location within Poland
- Coordinates: 51°41′8″N 15°50′4″E
- Country: Poland
- Voivodeship: Lubusz
- County: Nowa Sól
- Gmina: Bytom Odrzański
- Population (approx.): 70

Bonów [ˈbɔnuf] (1945-1950: Banów) is a village in the administrative district of Gmina Bytom Odrzański, within Nowa Sól County, Lubusz Voivodeship, in western Poland.
