= Świdnik County =

Świdnik County Powiat świdnicki
- County
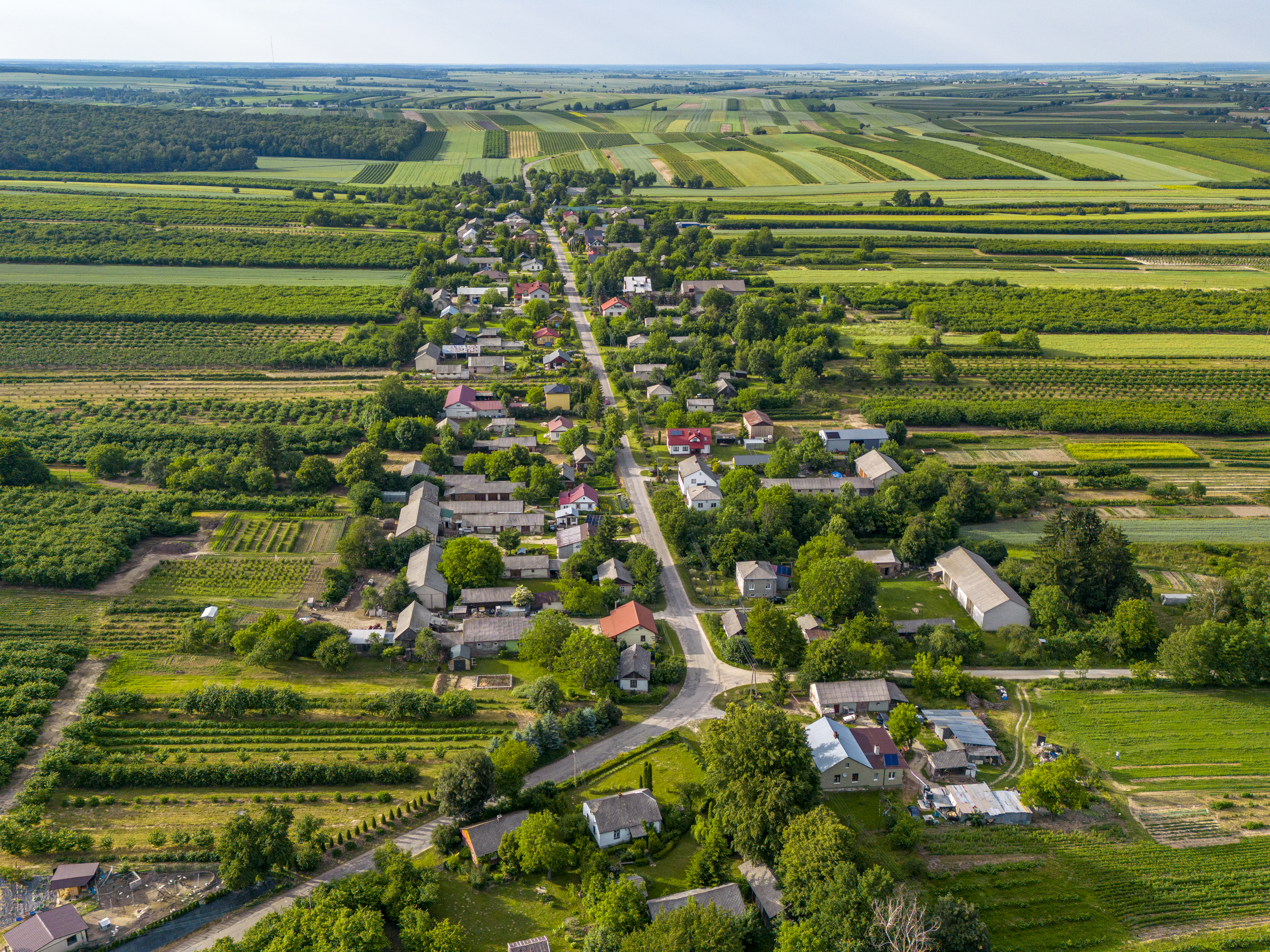
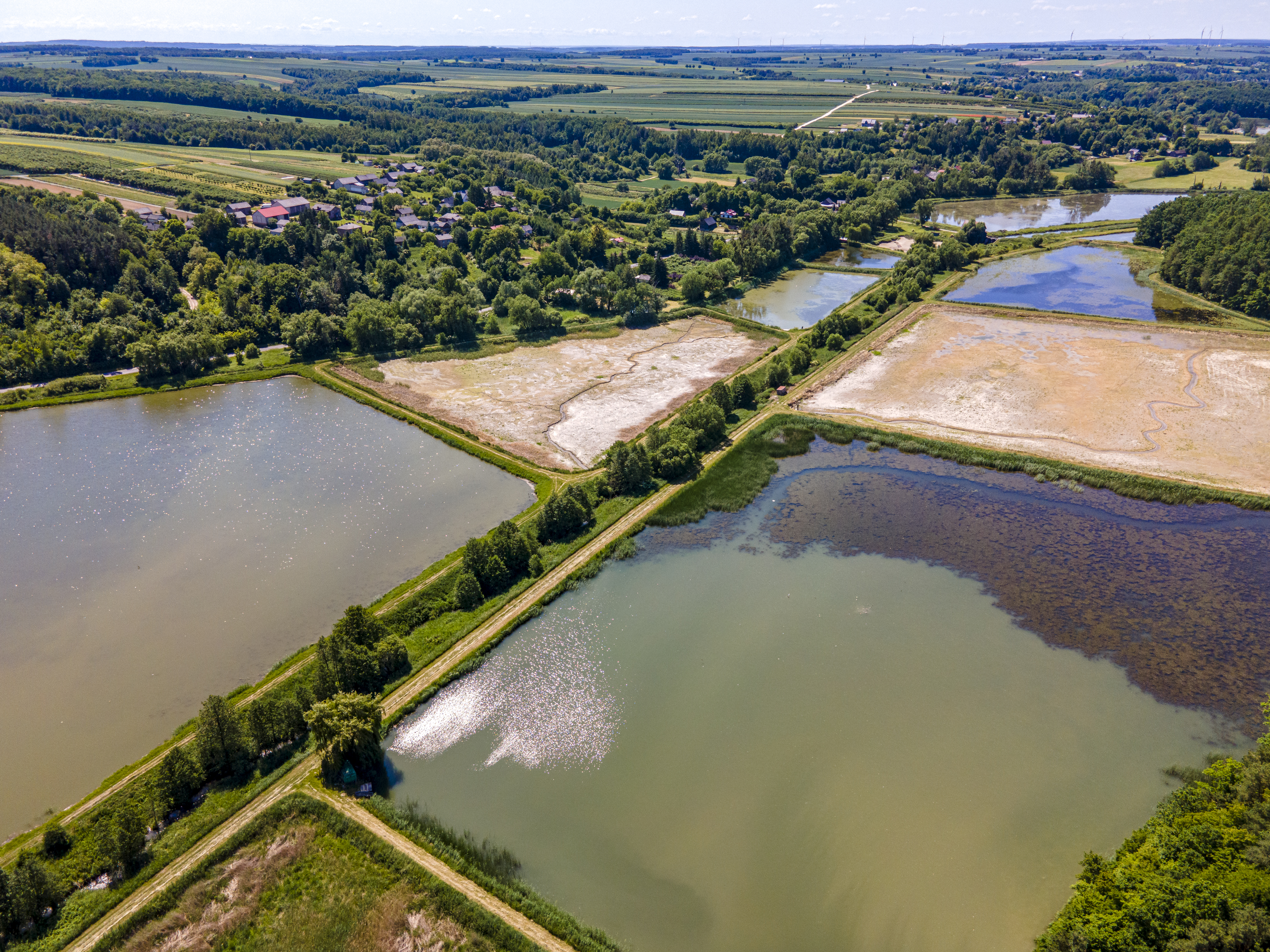
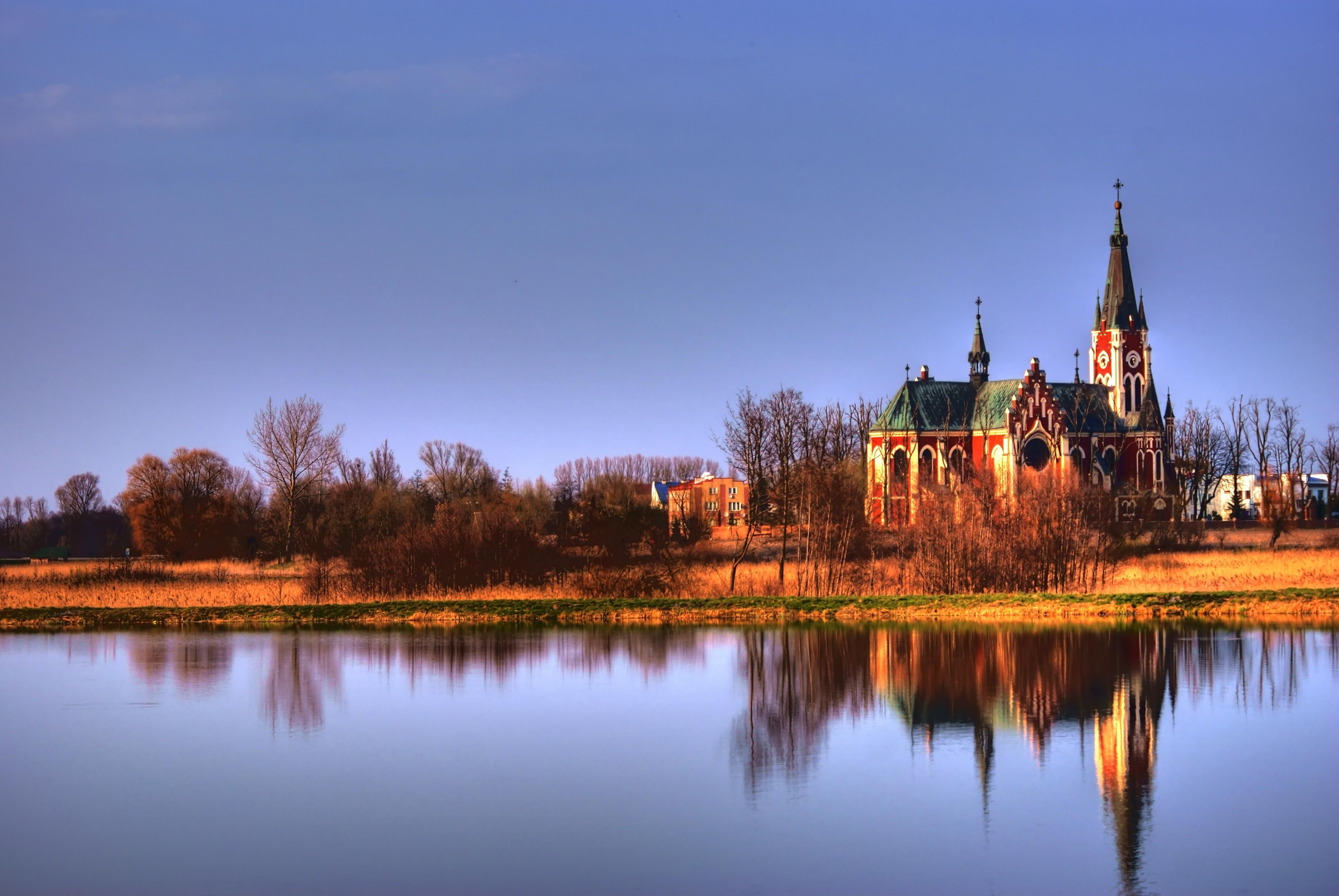
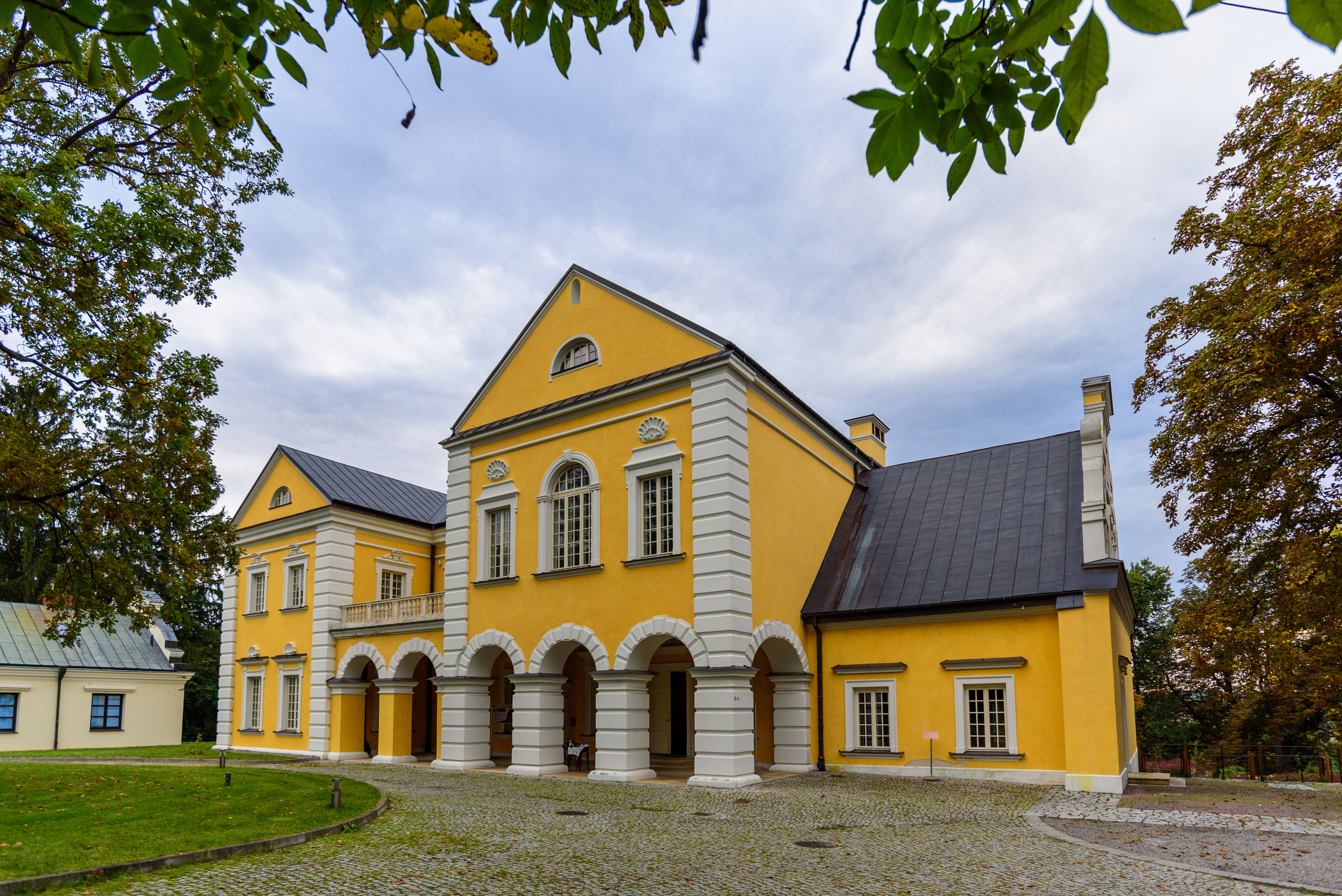
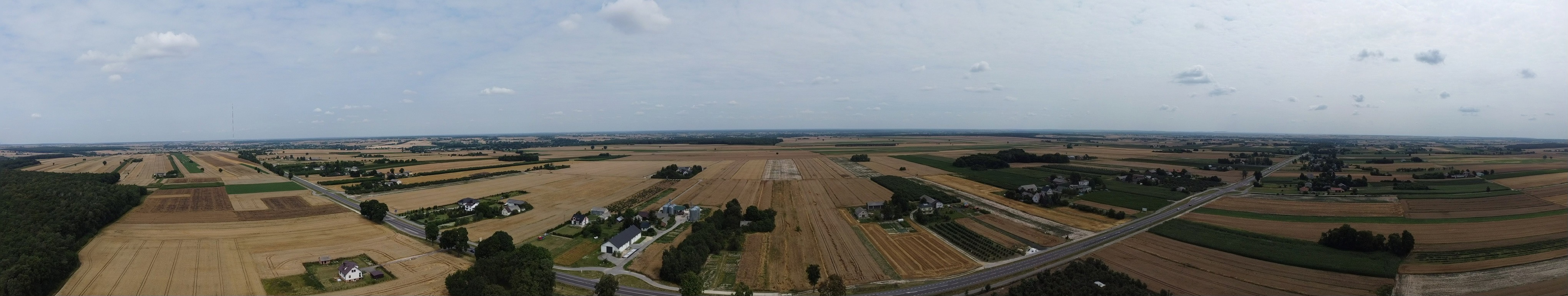
- Izdebno-Kolonia Ponds in Pilaszkowice Pierwsze Saint Vitus church in Mełgiew Palace in Gardzienice Pierwsze Countryside in Kolonia Siedliszczki

- Flag Coat of arms

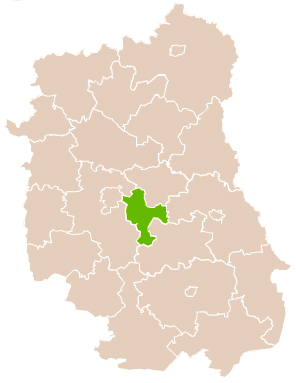
- Location within the voivodeship
- Coordinates (Świdnik): 51°13′N 22°42′E
- Country: Poland
- Voivodeship: Lublin
- Seat: Świdnik
- Gminas: Total 5 (incl. 1 urban): Świdnik; Gmina Mełgiew; Gmina Piaski; Gmina Rybczewice; Gmina Trawniki

Area
  - Total: 468.97 km^{2} (181.07 sq mi)

Population (2019)
  - Total: 71,897
  - Density: 153.31/km^{2} (397.07/sq mi)
  - Urban: 41,770
  - Rural: 30,127
- Time zone: UTC+1 (CET)
  - Summer (DST): UTC+2 (CEST)
- Car plates: LSW
- Website: www.powiatswidnik.pl

Świdnik County (Polish: powiat świdnicki) is a unit of territorial administration and local government (powiat) in Lublin Voivodeship, eastern Poland. It was established on January 1, 1999, as a result of the Polish local government reforms passed in 1998. Its administrative seat and largest city is Świdnik, which lies 10 kilometres (6 mi) east of the regional capital Lublin. The only other town in the county is Piaski, lying 14 km (9 mi) south-east of Świdnik.

The county covers an area of 468.97 square kilometres (181.1 sq mi). As of 2019, its total population is 71,897, including a population of 39,217 in Świdnik, 2,553 in Piaski, and a rural population of 30,127.

== Neighbouring counties ==
Świdnik County is bordered by Łęczna County to the north-east, Chełm County to the east, Krasnystaw County to the south-east, and Lublin County and the city of Lublin to the west.

== Administrative divisions ==
The county is subdivided into five gminas (one urban, one urban-rural and three rural). These are listed in the following table, in descending order of population.

Gmina	Type	Area (km^{2})	Population (2019)	Seat
Świdnik	urban	20.4	39,217	
Gmina Piaski	urban-rural	169.7	10,538	Piaski
Gmina Mełgiew	rural	95.6	9,819	Mełgiew
Gmina Trawniki	rural	84.2	8,931	Trawniki
Gmina Rybczewice	rural	99.1	3,392	Rybczewice
