= Bizarre =

Bizarre may refer to:

- Bizarre (TV series), a Canadian sketch comedy television series
- Bizarre (magazine), a British alternative magazine published from 1997 to 2015
- Bizarre (film), a 2015 French film
- Bizarre (American fetish magazine), a sexual fetish magazine published by John Willie
- Bizarre (1941 magazine), a semi-professional science fiction magazine that produced a single issue in 1941
- French ship Bizarre, several ships

== Music ==
- Bizarre (band), a Spanish rock band, or their debut album
- Bizarre (rapper) (born 1976), an American rapper and member of hip hop group D12
- Bizarre Records, a record label
- "Bizarre" (song), a song by Madonna and Martin Garrix from Confessions II, 2026
- Bizarre, an album by The Sylvers, or the title track, 1984
- "Bizarre", a song by U-God from Golden Arms Redemption, 1999
- "Bizarre", a song by Wahnfried from Trance Appeal, 1996
- Bizarre / Child Of The Universe (Sanvean), an EP by DJ Taucher, 1999
- "(You're So) Bizarre", a song by Kayak from Royal Bed Bouncer, 1975

== See also ==
- Bazaar (disambiguation)
- Bizarre, Bizarre, a 1937 French comedy film
- Bizarre Creations, a video game developer
- Bizarre Foods with Andrew Zimmern, a television series airing on Travel Channel
- Bizaar, a 2000 album by Insane Clown Posse
- Bizarre Inc, an English house band
- Bizarro (disambiguation)
- Bizzar, a companion 2000 album by Insane Clown Posse
- Bizzarria, a type of hybrid plant
- Some Bizzare Records, a record label
