= Bazaar =

Type of public marketplace

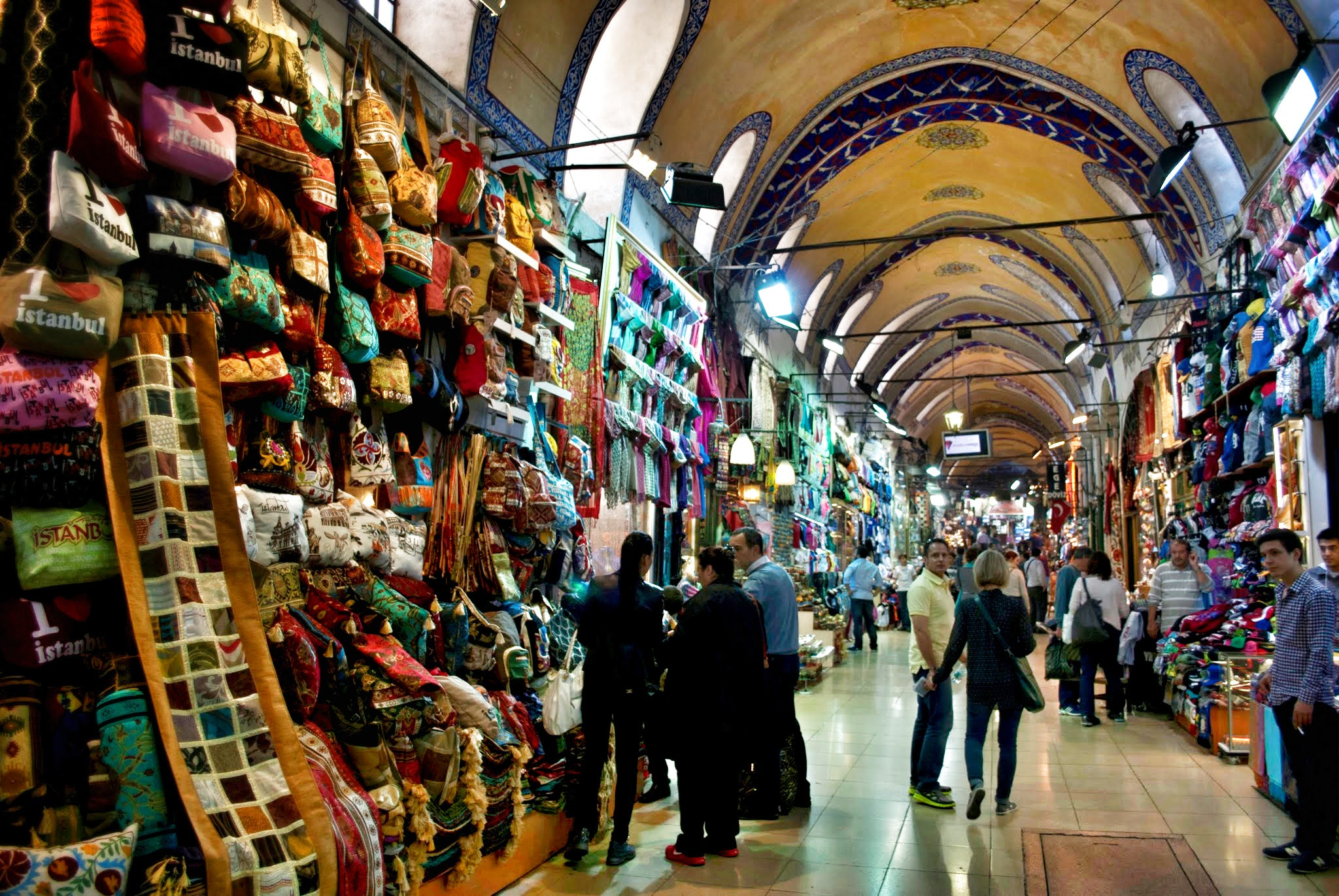
The Grand Bazaar in Istanbul, Turkey

A bazaar (Note: Persian: بازار, romanized: bâzâr; Arabic: بازار; Ottoman Turkish: پازار, romanized: pazar; Uzbek: бозор/bozor; Hindi: बाज़ार, romanized: bāzār; Punjabi: ਬਜ਼ਾਰ।, romanized: bazāra; Bengali: বাজার, romanized: bājār; Urdu: بازار, romanized: bazār; Kurdish: بازاڕ, romanized: bazar) or souk (Note: Arabic: سوق, romanized: sūq; Hebrew: שׁוּק, romanized: šūq. In English, the word can also be spelled souq or suq.) is a marketplace consisting of multiple small stalls or shops, especially in West Asia, North Africa, the Balkans, Central Asia, and South Asia. They are traditionally located in vaulted or covered streets that have doors on each end and served as a city's central marketplace.

The term bazaar originates from Persian, where it referred to a town's public market district. Bazaari refers collectively to the merchants, bankers and craftsmen who work in a bazaar. The term souk comes from Arabic and refers to marketplaces in West Asia and North Africa.

Although the lack of archaeological evidence has limited detailed studies of the evolution of bazaars, the earliest evidence for the existence of bazaars or souks dates to around 3000 BCE. Cities in the ancient West Asia appear to have contained commercial districts. Later, in the historic Islamic world, bazaars typically shared in common certain institutions, such as the position of the muḥtasib, and certain architectural forms, such as roofed streets and courtyard buildings known in English as caravanserais. The exact details of their evolution and organization varied from region to region.

In the 18th and 19th centuries, Western interest in oriental culture led to the publication of many books about daily life in West Asian countries. Souks, bazaars and the trappings of trade feature prominently in paintings and engravings, works of fiction and travel writing.

Shopping at a bazaar or market-place remains a central feature of daily life in many West and South Asian cities and towns and the bazaar remains the beating heart of West Asian and South Asian life; in West Asia, souks tend to be found in a city's old quarter. Bazaars and souks are often important tourist attractions. A number of bazaar districts have been listed as UNESCO World Heritage Sites due to their historical and/or architectural significance.

== Terminology ==
=== Bazaar ===
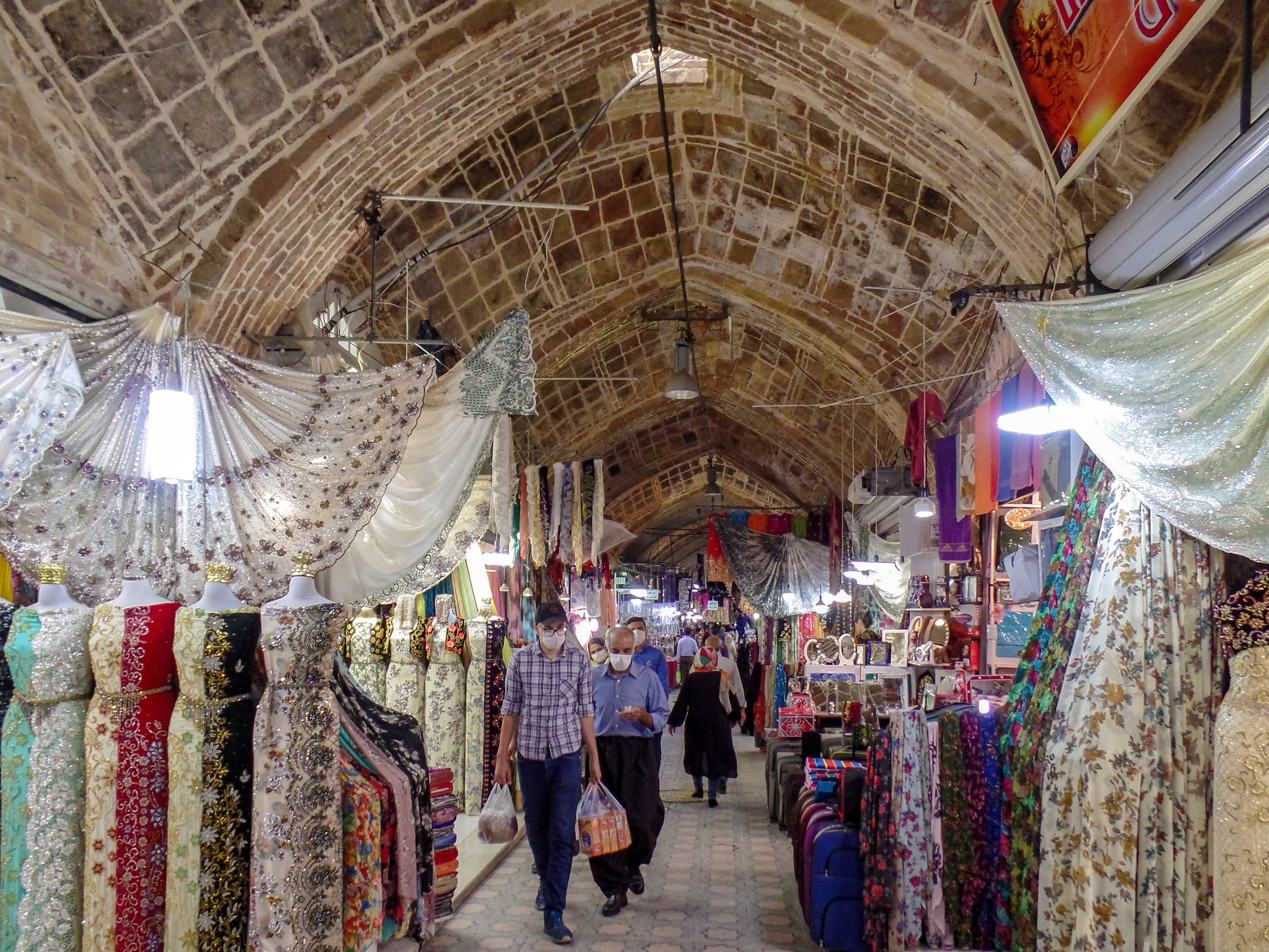
Bazaar in Sanandaj, Iran

The origin of the word "bazaar" comes from New Persian bāzār, Persian: بازار from Middle Persian wāzār, from Old Persian wāčar, from Proto-Indo-Iranian *wahā-čarana. The term spread from Persian into Arabic, now used throughout West Asia and in the Indian subcontinent.

In North America and Europe, the English word "bazaar" can denote more generically a shop or market selling miscellaneous items. It can also refer in particular to a sale or fair to raise money for charitable purposes (e.g. charity bazaar).

=== Souk ===
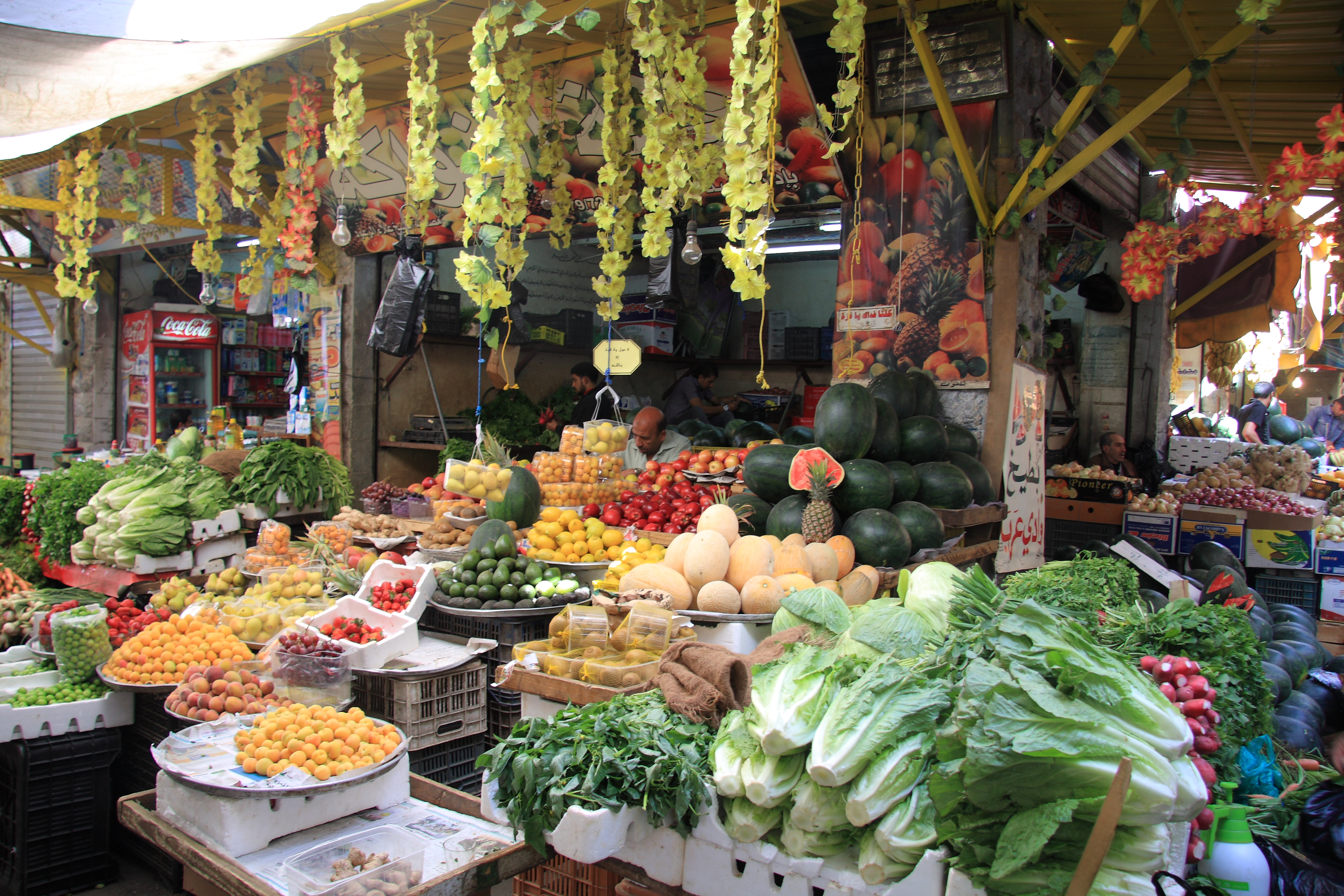
Souk in Amman, Jordan

The word "souk" in the Arabic-speaking world is roughly equivalent to "bazaar". The Arabic word is a loan from Aramaic "šūqā" ("street, market"), itself a loanword from the Akkadian "sūqu" ("street"). The Arabic word sūq was then borrowed into English via French (souk) by the 19th century. The English word can also be spelled "suq" or "souq" — with the 'q' being a transliteration of the Arabic 'ق' (qaf).

In Modern Standard Arabic the term al-sūq refers to markets in both the physical sense and the abstract economic sense (e.g., an Arabic-speaker would speak of the sūq in the old city as well as the sūq for oil, and would call the concept of the free market السوق الحرّ, as-sūq al-ḥurr).

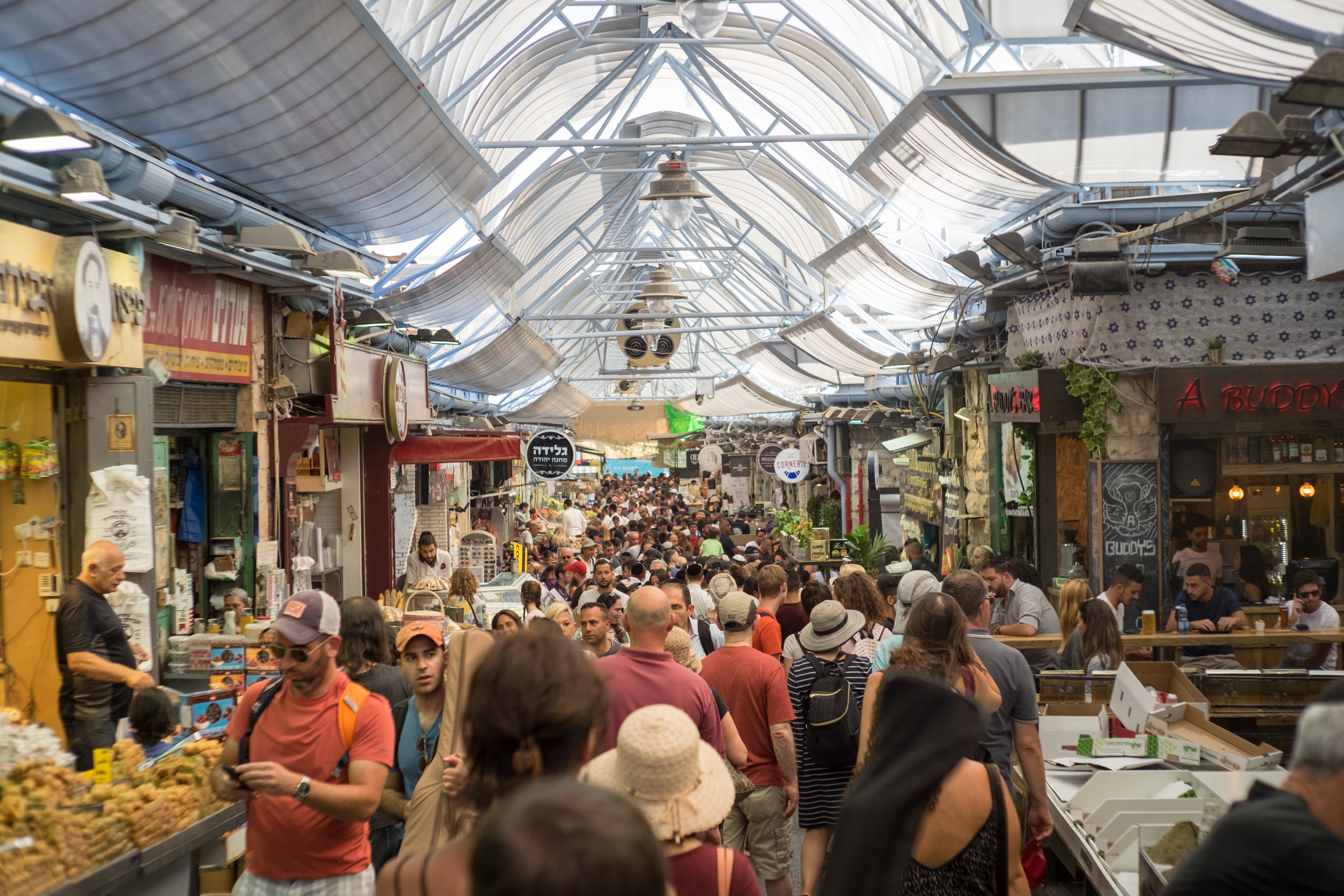
Shuk Mahane Yehuda, a popular shuk in Jerusalem, often simply called the Shuk (Hebrew: השוק, romanized: ha-Šūq)

In Israel, the term shuk or shuq (Hebrew: שׁוּק, romanized: šūq) shares a common Aramaic origin with the Arabic souk, and holds a prominent role in everyday life. Markets such as Mahane Yehuda in Jerusalem are often covered rows of stalls much like those seen elsewhere in the region, selling produce, spices, halvah, and even clothing.

==== Variations ====
In northern Morocco, the Spanish corruption socco is often used as in the Grand Socco and Petit Socco of Tangiers.

== History ==
=== Origins in antiquity ===
Scholar Mohammad Gharipour has pointed out that in spite of the centrality of bazaars in Persian history, relatively little is known due to the lack of archaeological evidence. Historical records document the concept of a bazaar existing in Iran as early as 3000 BCE, where some large cities contained districts dedicated to trade and commerce. Archeological data also suggests the existence of market districts in ancient Mesopotamia. Markets centres must have existed in Egypt to conduct international trade, but no archaeological evidence for them has been found. In Achaemenid Persia (550–330 BCE), documents indicate that crafts were sold in markets close to Persepolis. A network of bazaars had sprung up alongside ancient caravan trade routes. Bazaars located along these trade routes formed networks, linking major cities with each other and in which goods, culture, people and information could be exchanged. Sources from around the same era also indicate that ancient Greeks regulated trade in areas at the centre of their cities around stoa buildings. The ideas of Greek city planning were spread to West Asia during the Seleucid period, following the conquests of Alexander the Great.

The Greek historian, Herodotus, noted that in Egypt, roles were reversed compared with other cultures and Egyptian women frequented the market and carried on trade, while the men remained at home weaving cloth. He also described The Babylonian Marriage Market.

Sassanid rule in Iran was an important period for the development of urbanization and commerce. In Sassanid Iran, the bazaar was usually the heart of a town or city, where it spread outwards and affected the development of other neighbourhoods. The bazaar usually contained, or was adjoined by, an open-air plaza that served as a forum of socio-economic activity.

Historically, bazaars were also held outside cities at locations where incoming caravans stopped and merchants displayed their goods for sale. Bazaars were established at caravanserai, places where a caravan or caravans arrived and remained for rest and refreshments. Since this might be infrequent, souks often extended beyond buying and selling goods to include major festivals involving various cultural and social activities. Any bazaar may serve a social function as being a place for people to meet in, in addition to its commercial function.

In pre-Islamic Arabia, two types of souks existed: permanent urban markets and temporary seasonal markets. The temporary seasonal markets were held at specific times of the year and became associated with particular types of produce. Suq Hijr in Bahrain was noted for its dates while Suq 'Adan was known for its spices and perfumes. In spite of the centrality of West Asia in the history of souks, relatively little is known due to the lack of archaeological evidence. However, documentary sources point to permanent marketplaces in cities from as early as 550 BCE.

=== Islamic period ===
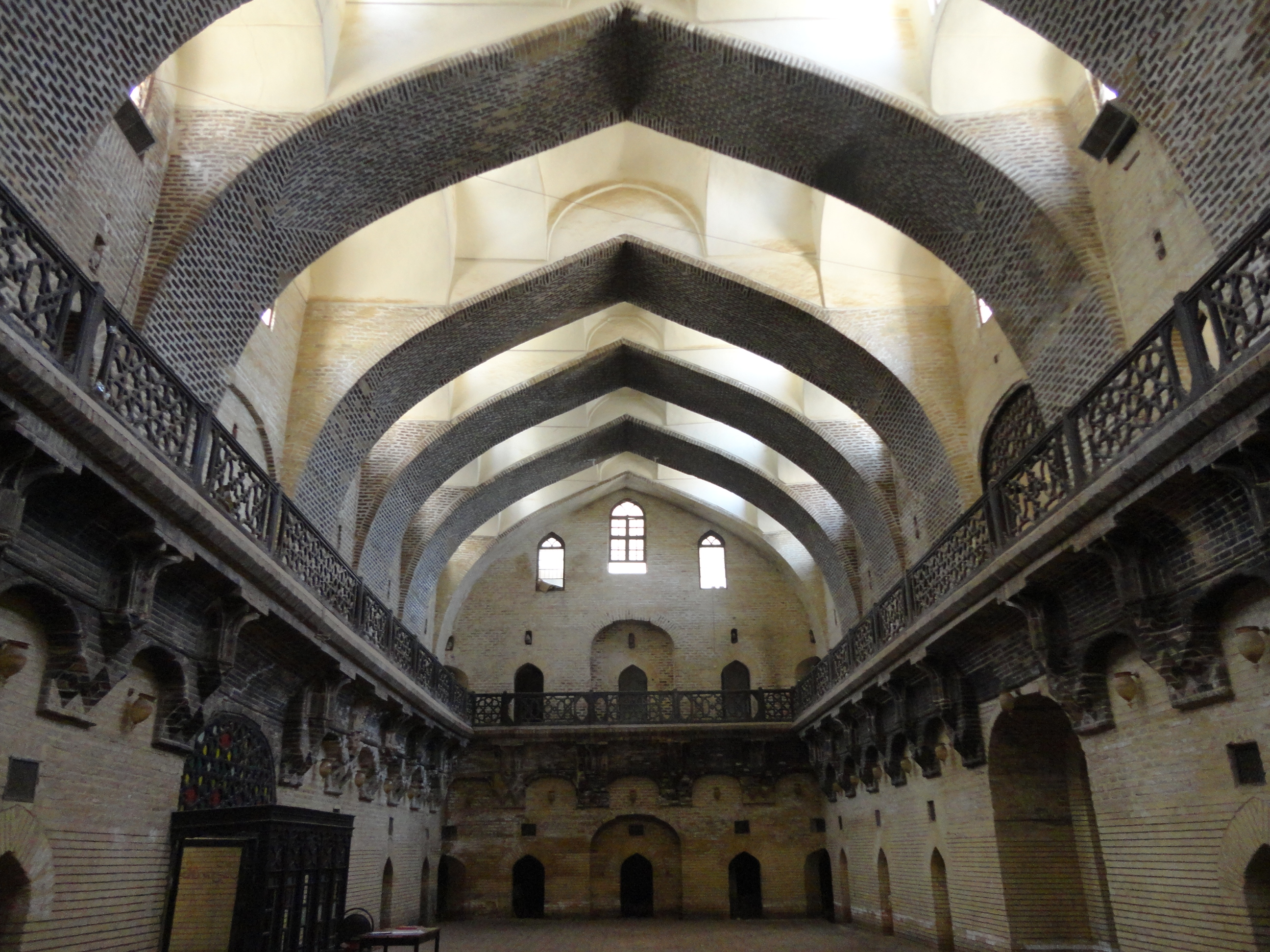
Khan al-Mirjan in Baghdad (14th century), one of the oldest preserved urban commercial structures in the Islamic world

According to traditional Muslim narratives, Muhammad established a market place (sūq) in Medina shortly after arriving there during the Hijrah in 622 CE. He designated an open, unbuilt space as the market area and forbade both the construction of permanent structures and the levying of taxes in this area. Eight years later, he is said to have appointed a market inspector ('āmil 'alā l-sūq), a position that likely evolved into the later muḥtasib in Islamic cities, an official in charge of overseeing public morality and regulating weights and measures.

Despite the importance of the bazaar to economic life and the prominence of marketplace terminology in the Quran, not much is known about the early history of bazaars and it remains a topic of ongoing research. Most of the surviving urban commercial structures in the Islamic world date from the 16th century or later, though some preserved urban caravanserais (commonly known as a funduq, khān, or wakāla) date from earlier periods. The oldest of these is the Khan al-Mirjan in Baghdad, built in 1359 as part of a larger architectural complex.

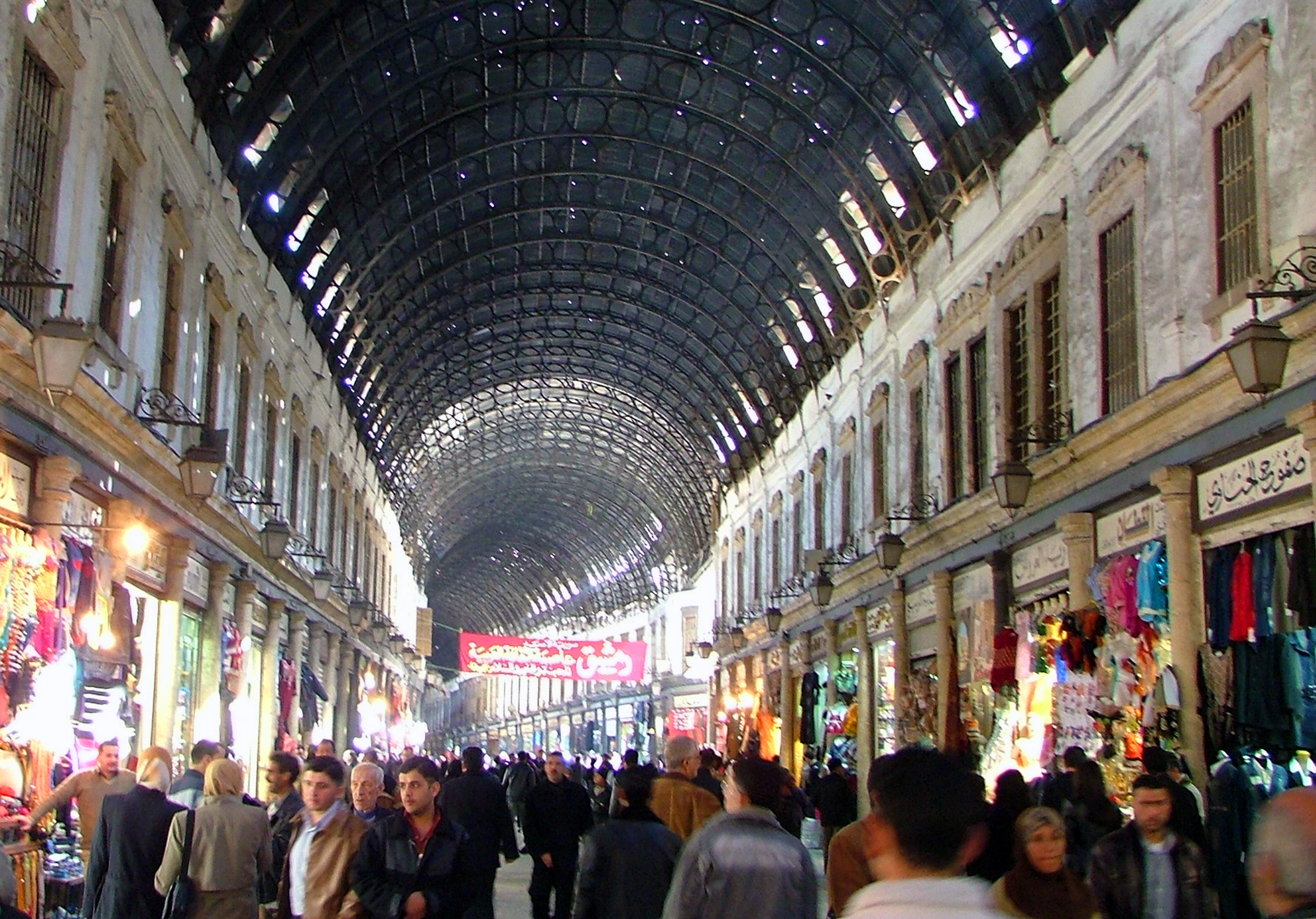
Al-Hamidiyah Souq in Damascus

Muhammad's prohibition against constructing permanent buildings and levying taxes in the market began to be disregarded as early as the Umayyad period (7th to 8th centuries). The Umayyad caliphs Mu'awiya I and Hisham ibn Abd al-Malik both built structures in the market of Medina and levied taxes there, while purpose-built markets were built in early Islamic cities further abroad such as Basra in Iraq, Fustat in Egypt, and Kairouan in Tunisia. This process seems to have accelerated during the reign of Hisham ibn Abd al-Malik (r. 724–743) in particular. Markets that sold the most important or expensive goods were usually located near the city's central Friday mosque. In some cities, such as Cairo and Aleppo, the main bazaar was initially focused along one important street and then progressively grew and branched off into the surrounding streets.

During the Islamic period in Iran, bazaars developed along the same lines as those of the Sassanid period. Up to the 11th century, the bazaar developed more commonly in the suburbs outside the city walls that enclosed the shahristān, the formal city. This was especially true in Central Asia, though there were exceptions in some regions where the bazaar was grouped with the citadel and the city's Friday mosque inside the city walls. After the 11th century, the growing importance of the suburbs and the commercial districts resulted in most of them being enclosed within newly expanded city walls. From the 10th century onward, the bazaar became the financial centre of a city and was heavily patronized and developed by ruling elites. The grouping of a bazaar, citadel, and Friday mosque also became more common.

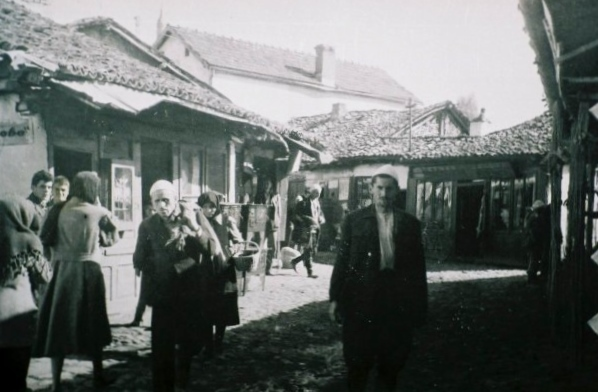
The Old Bazaar of Pristina, Kosovo

In the Mamluk Sultanate (13th to 16th centuries) and in the Ottoman Empire (14th to 20th centuries), the construction of commercial buildings in and around the bazaar was often sponsored by sultans, ruling elites, or by members of the Ottoman royal family. The revenues generated by these buildings were typically earmarked to support the upkeep of religious complexes sponsored by these same patrons, through the legal framework of a waqf (legal endowment).

=== 21st century ===
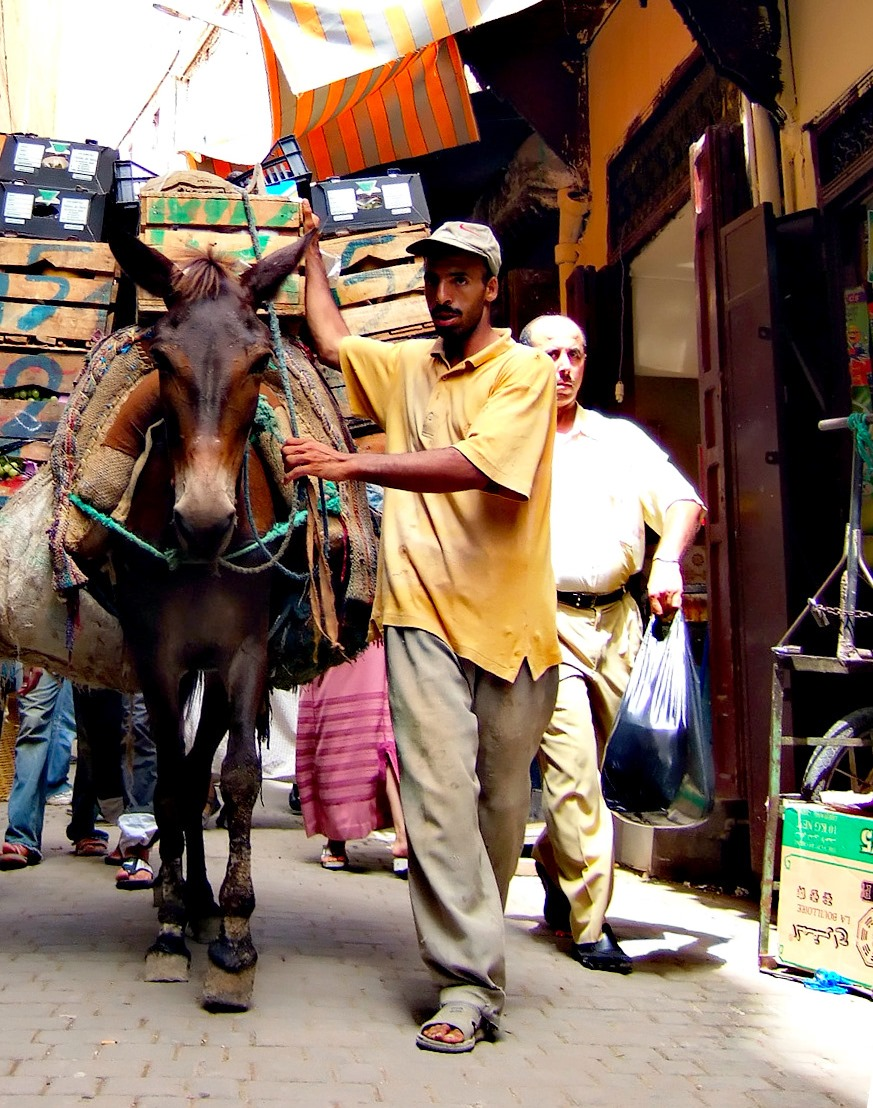
Mule moving goods around in the car-free Medina quarter, Fes, Morocco

In West Asia, the bazaar is considered to be "the beating heart of the city and a symbol of Islamic architecture and culture of high significance." Today, bazaars are popular sites for tourists and some of these ancient bazaars have been listed as world heritage sites or national monuments on the basis of their historical, cultural or architectural value.

The Medina of Fez, Morocco, which includes numerous long market streets (e.g. Tala'a Kebira) and bazaar areas (e.g. Kissariat al-Kifah), was listed as a UNESCO World Heritage Site in 1981. Al-Madina Souk in Aleppo is the largest covered historic market in the world, with an approximate length of 13 kilometres. It is part of the Ancient Aleppo, a UNESCO World Heritage Site since 1986 in Syria. The Bazaar complex in Tabriz, Iran, was listed by UNESCO in 2010. The Bazaar of Qaisiyariye in Lar, Iran, is on the tentative list of UNESCO World Heritage Sites since 2007. Kemeraltı Bazaar in İzmir was placed on tentative list in 2020.

== Organization and institutions ==
Shopping at a souk or market place is part of daily life throughout much of West Asia. Prices are commonly set by bargaining, also known as haggling, between buyers and sellers.

Bazaars or souks are traditionally divided into specialized sections dealing in specific types of product, each usually housed in a few narrow streets and named after the product it specializes in such as the gold souk, the textile souk, the spice souk, the leather souk, the booksellers' souk, etc. This promotes competition among sellers and helps buyers easily compare prices. Merchants specialized in each trade were also organized into guilds, which provided support to merchants but also to clients. The exact details of the organizations varied from region to region. Each guild had rules that members were expected to follow, but they were loose enough to allow for competition. Guilds also fulfilled some functions similar to trade unions and were able to negotiate with the government on behalf of merchants or represent their interests when needed.

Though each neighbourhood within the city would have a local souk selling food and other essentials, the main bazaar was one of the central structures of a large city, selling durable goods, luxuries and providing services such as money exchange. Workshops where goods for sale are produced (in the case of a merchant selling locally made products) are typically located away from the souk itself.

Historically, in Islamic cities, the muḥtasib was the official in charge of regulating and policing the bazaar and other aspects of urban life. They monitored things such as weights and measures, pricing, cleanliness, noise, and traffic circulation, as well as being responsible for other issues of public morality. They also investigated complaints about cheating or the quality of goods. The equivalent official could be known by other titles in different regions, such as the kedkhoda in Istanbul or the amir-i bazariyan in Delhi. In the Maghreb (northwestern Africa), the muḥtasib also shared responsibilities with other officials such as the qadi or the hakim.

== Layout and architecture ==
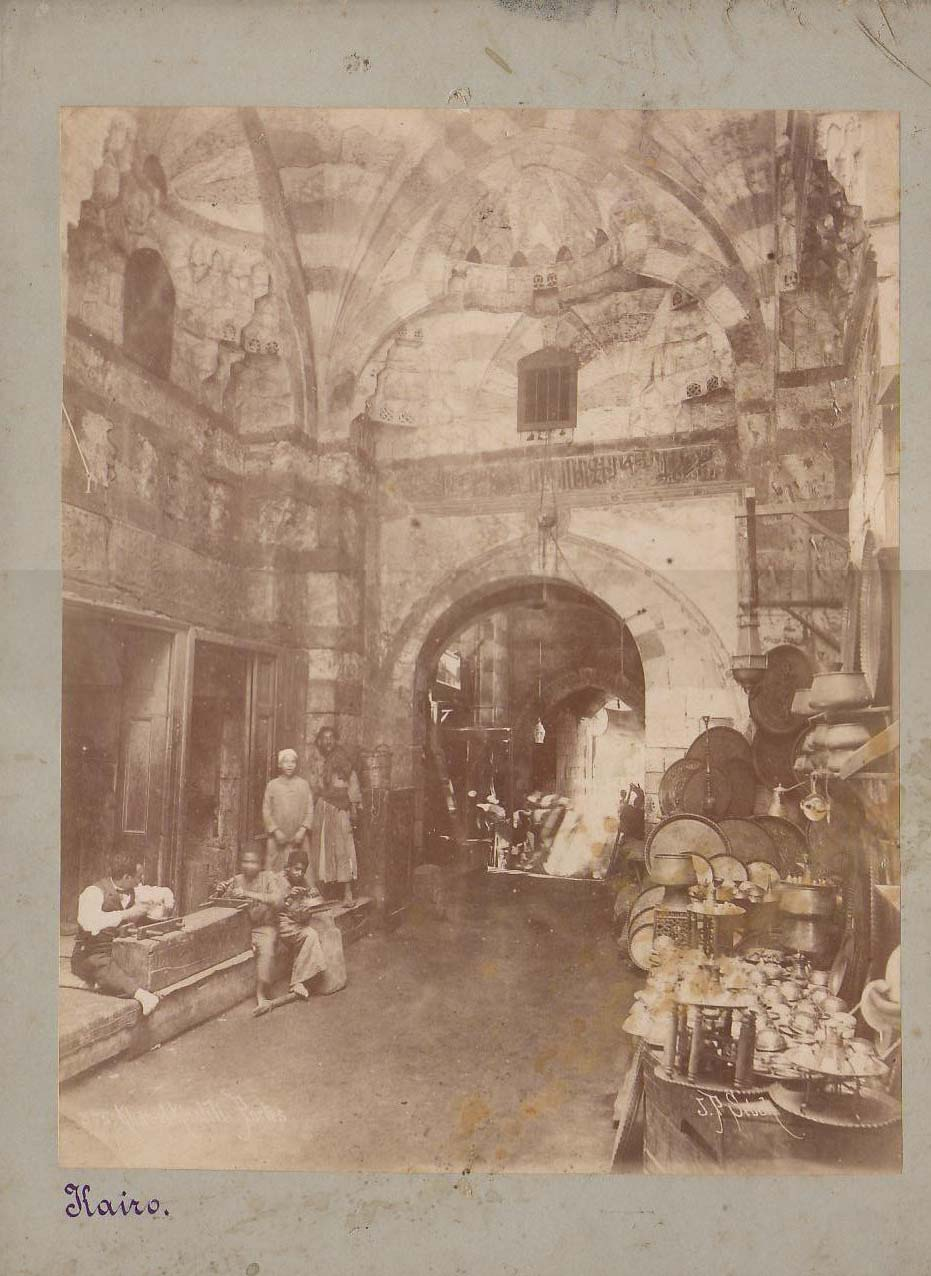
Khan el-Khalili, the central bazaar of Cairo (photo from 1880s)

Permanent bazaars were established in urban zones, usually within the city walls and close to the heart of the city. In much of West Asia and North Africa, the bazaar is a network of interconnected spaces, including streets and buildings, with diverse architectural forms. Its boundaries are not sharply defined and can vary according to circumstance, as the bazaar is closely integrated with its urban surroundings and with other important institutions of the city.

Although there is great variety among the bazaars of this region, there are three recurring elements, in addition to the general network of market streets. One element is the individual shops or booths that line each side of a market street. The shops are usually small spaces open to the street and occupied by merchants. They are typically equipped with large shutters which can be closed and locked when the shopkeeper is away. Another element is a more secure market area, usually centrally located and consisting of streets that were covered or roofed. This complex is variably known as a qayṣariyya, bedesten, or khān, depending on the city or historical period. It usually hosted the most prestigious and profitable trades such as jewelry, perfumes, and textiles. In order to protect these goods, the entrances to this area could be closed and locked at night or in times of danger. The other recurring element is the presence of courtyard buildings entered via a single large doorway. Often translated into English as a caravanserai, this type of building is known in different regions as a funduq, khān, samsara, or wakāla. They could serve a variety of functions including an inn for travellers and merchants, a manufacturing centre, a trade venue, or a warehouse.

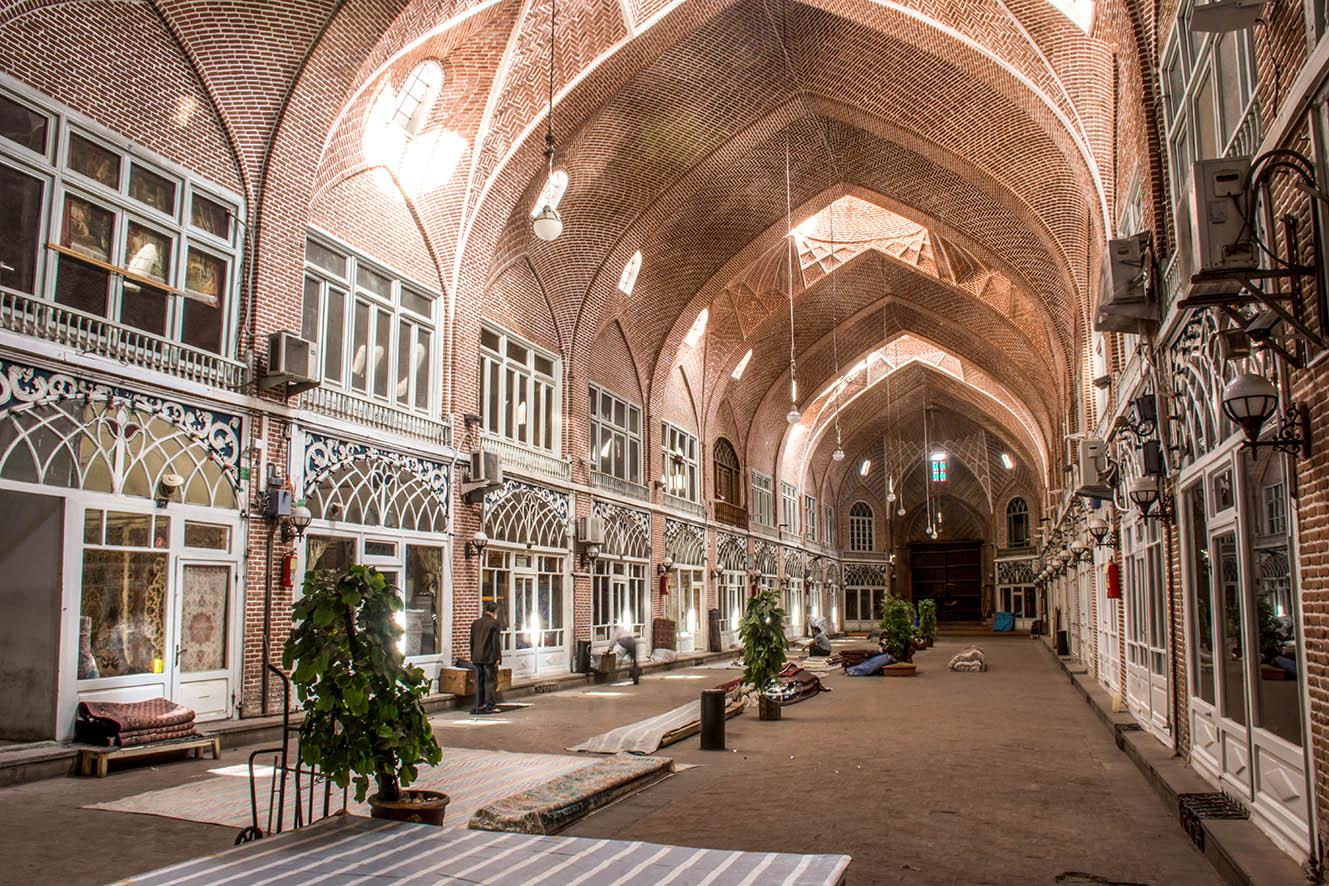
A covered market street in the Bazaar of Tabriz

In Iran and Central Asia, the permanent bazaar is likewise in the centre of a city and had common architectural elements. These bazaars acted as financial centres of the city and were traditionally overseen by the state. Some Iranian bazaars are organized around one long market street from which other market streets branch off (e.g. in Isfahan or Tehran), while others are large rectangular zones with a grid-like network of parallel and intersecting streets (e.g. as in Tabriz). The streets are lined with structures of one or two storeys that contain spaces for shops. The streets are typically roofed with brick vaults, pierced by skylights to allow for light and air circulation. The shops are often adjacent or connected to the workshops where the goods are also produced, so that manufacturing and retail are often concentrated in the same areas, though some production (especially of textiles) was also distributed in other parts of the city. Like the bazaars further west, there were also many khāns (caravanserais) built in the area. They acted as warehouses, production centres, wholesale centres, hostels for merchants, and offices for conducting business.

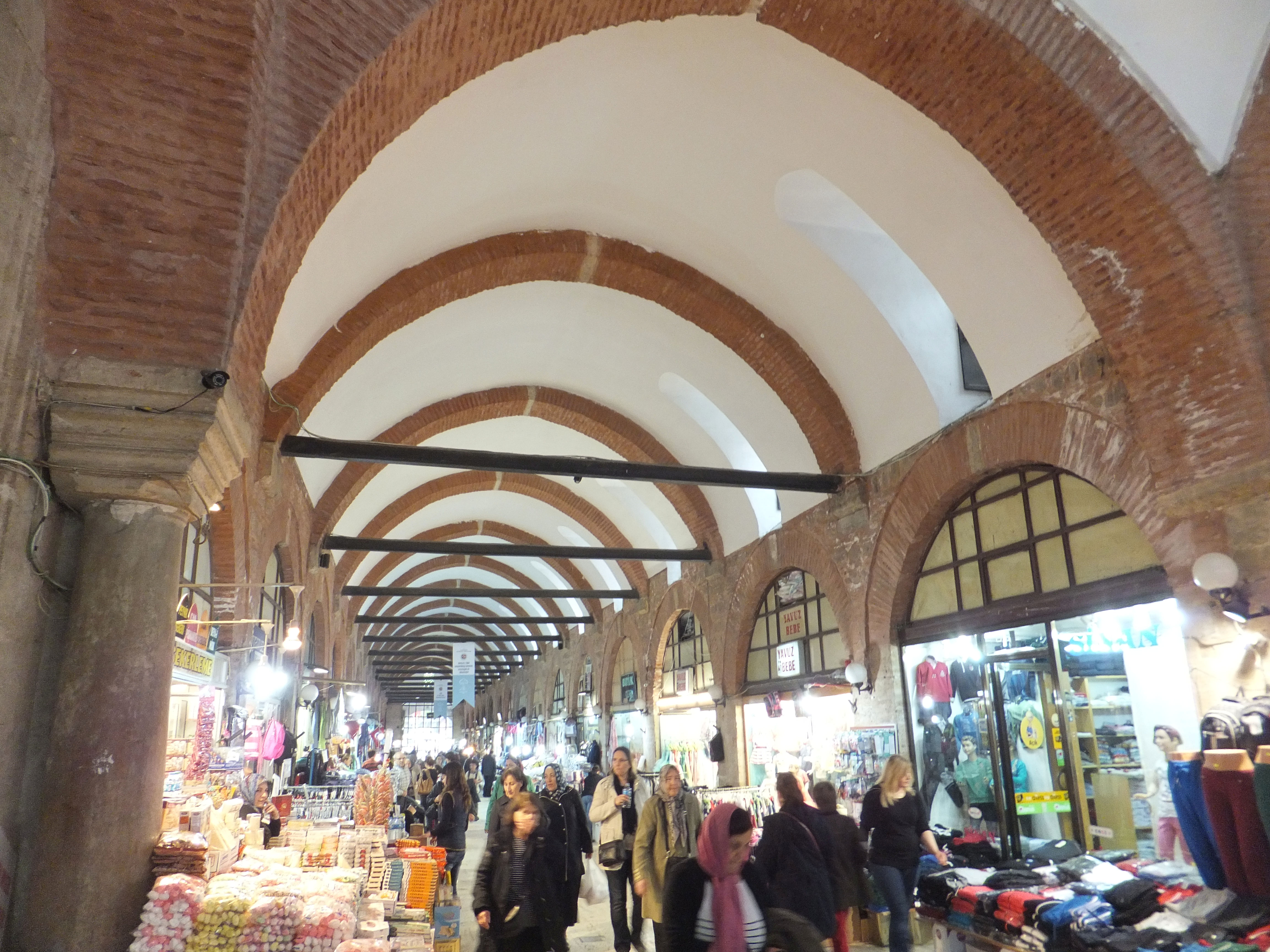
The arasta of the Selimiye Mosque complex in Edirne

In the cities that developed under the Ottoman Empire, there was generally one central bazaar area, known in Turkish as the çarşı. The Grand Bazaar in Istanbul, known locally as the Kapalıçarşı ('covered market'), is a famous example. Additionally, several types of market structures were common: the bedesten, the arasta, and the han (Turkish cognate of khān). The Ottoman bedesten was a solid stone building, typically rectangular and roofed by domes, with shops inside. Like the qayṣariyya or bedesten in other regions, it hosted the most important and luxurious trades. The arasta is usually an elongated market structure or market street with shops lining its façades. Arastas could be independent markets built outside the main bazaar area, such as those built as part of large religious complexes like the Selimiye Mosque complex in Edirne or the Sultanahmet Mosque complex in Istanbul. The Spice Bazaar or Mısır Çarşısı ('Egyptian Market') in Istanbul is also one of the largest and best-known examples. The han is similar in function to other khān or caravanserai buildings elsewhere, with a courtyard enclosed by two storeys. The ground floor was usually used for storage and for stabling horses, while the upper floor housed merchants.

== Temporary souks ==
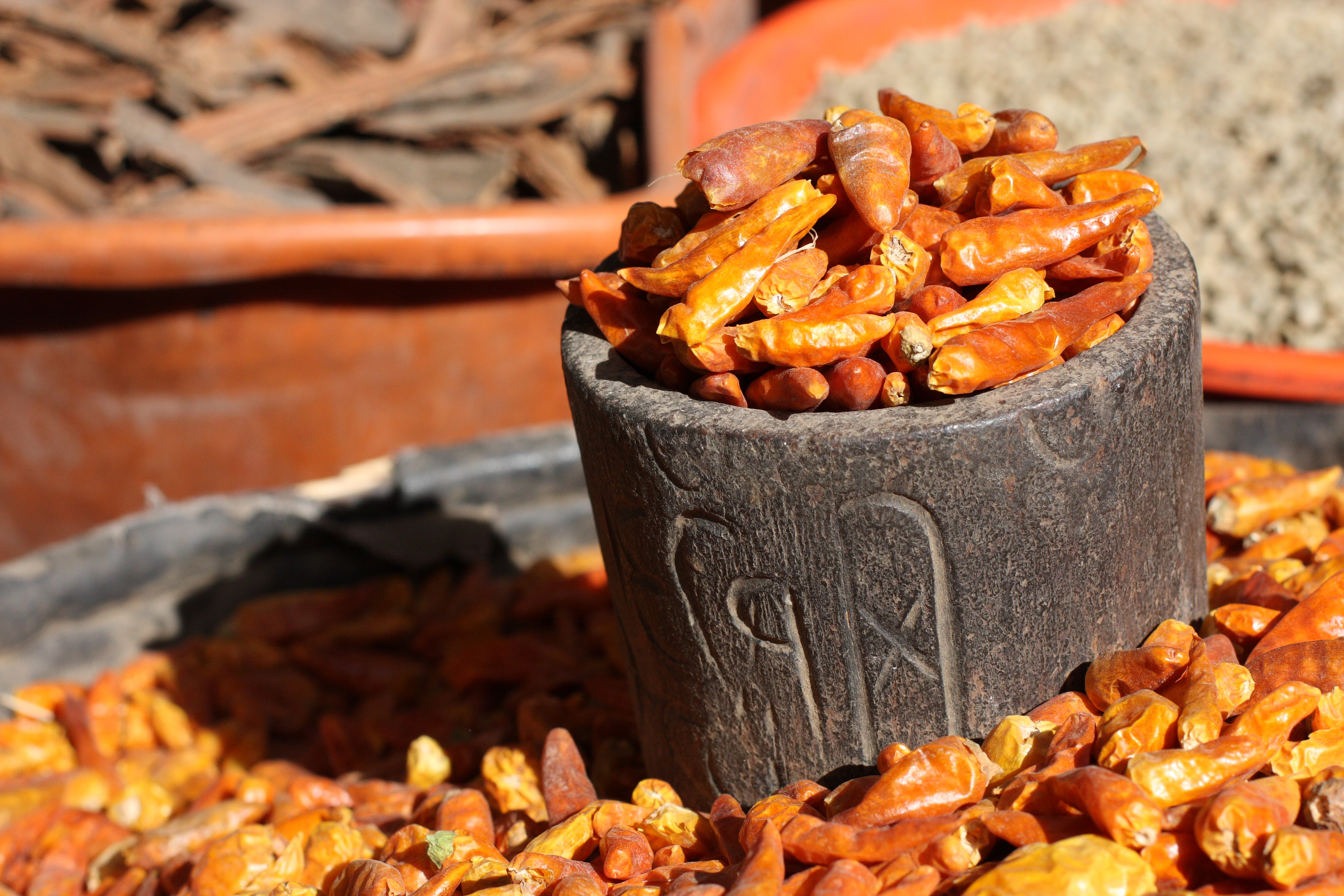
Cayenne peppers at the Souk Al Milh in Sanaa, Yemen

A temporary, seasonal souk is held at a set time that might be yearly, monthly or weekly. The oldest souks were set up annually, and were typically general festivals held outside cities. For example, Souk Ukadh was held yearly in pre-Islamic times in an area between Mecca and Ta’if during the sacred month of Dhu al-Qi'dah. While a busy market, it was more famous for its poetry competitions, judged by prominent poets such as Al-Khansa and Al-Nabigha. An example of an Islamic annual souk is Al Mirbid just outside Basra, also famed for its poetry competitions in addition to its storytelling activities. Temporary souks tended to become known for specific types of produce. For example, Suq Hijr in Bahrain was noted for its dates while Suq 'Adan was known for its spices and perfumes. Political, economic and social changes have left only the small seasonal souks outside villages and small towns, primarily selling livestock and agricultural products.

Weekly markets have continued to function throughout the Arab world. Most of them are named from the day of the week on which they are held. They usually have open spaces specifically designated for their use inside cities. Examples of surviving markets are the Wednesday Market in Amman that specializes in the sale of used products, the Ghazl market held every Friday in Baghdad specializing in pets; the Fina’ Market in Marrakesh offers performance acts such as singing, music, acrobats and circus activities.

In tribal areas, where seasonal souks operated, neutrality from tribal conflicts was usually declared for the period of operation of a souk to permit the unhampered exchange of surplus goods. Some of the seasonal markets were held at specific times of the year and became associated with particular types of produce such as Suq Hijr in Bahrain, noted for its dates while Suq 'Adan was known for its spices and perfumes. In spite of the centrality of the West Asian market place, relatively little is known due to the lack of archaeological evidence.

== In art and literature – Orientalism ==
During the 18th and 19th centuries, Europeans conquered and excavated parts of North Africa and the Levant. These regions were, in relation to Europe, called the Near East and the Middle East, but also known as the Orient. Europeans sharply divided peoples into two broad groups – the European West (the Occident, ultimately from the Latin language) and the East (or Orient); us and the other. Europeans often saw Orientals as the opposite of Western civilization; the peoples could be threatening- they were "despotic, static and irrational whereas Europe was viewed as democratic, dynamic and rational." At the same time, the Orient was seen as exotic, mysterious, a place of fables and beauty. This fascination with the other gave rise to a genre of painting known as Orientalism. A proliferation of both Oriental fiction and travel writing occurred during the early modern period.

=== Subject-matter ===
Many of these works were lavishly illustrated with engravings of every day scenes of Oriental lifestyles, including scenes of market places and market trade. Artists focused on the exotic beauty of the land – the markets, caravans and snake charmers. Islamic architecture also became favourite subject matter. Some of these works were propaganda designed to justify European imperialism in the East, however many artists relied heavily on their everyday experiences for inspiration in their artworks. For example, Charles D'Oyly, who was born in India, published the Antiquities of Dacca featuring a series of 15 engraved plates of Dacca [now Dhaka, Bangladesh] featuring scenes of markets, commerce, buildings and streetscapes. European society generally frowned on nude painting – but harems, concubines and slave markets, presented as quasi-documentary works, satisfied European desires for pornographic art. The Oriental female wearing a veil was a particularly tempting subject because she was hidden from view, adding to her mysterious allure.

=== Notable Orientalist artists ===
Notable artists in the Orientalist genre include: Jean-Léon Gérôme Delacroix (1824–1904), Alexandre-Gabriel Decamps (1803–1860), Frederic Leighton (1830–1896), Eugène Alexis Girardet (1853–1907) and William Holman Hunt (1827–1910) who all found inspiration in Oriental street scenes, trading and commerce. French painter Jean-Étienne Liotard visited Istanbul in the 17th century and painted pastels of Turkish domestic scenes. British painter John Frederick Lewis who lived for several years in a traditional mansion in Cairo, painted highly detailed works showing realistic genre scenes of Egyptian life. Edwin Lord Weeks was a notable American example of a 19th-century artist and author in the Orientalism genre. His parents were wealthy tea and spice merchants who were able to fund his travels and interest in painting. In 1895 Weeks wrote and illustrated a book of travels titled From the Black Sea through Persia and India. Other notable painters in the Orientalist genre who included scenes of street life and market-based trade in their work are Jean-Léon Gérôme Delacroix (1824–1904), Alexandre-Gabriel Decamps (1803–1860), Frederic Leighton (1830–1896), Eugène Alexis Girardet 1853–1907 and William Holman Hunt (1827–1910), who all found inspiration in Oriental street scenes, trading and commerce.

=== Orientalist literature ===
A proliferation of both Oriental fiction and travel writing occurred during the early modern period.

Many English visitors to the Orient wrote narratives around their travels. British Romantic literature in the Orientalism tradition has its origins in the early eighteenth century, with the first translations of The Arabian Nights (translated into English from the French in 1705–08). The popularity of this work inspired authors to develop a new genre, the Oriental tale. Samuel Johnson's History of Rasselas, Prince of Abyssinia, (1759) is mid-century example of the genre. Byron's Oriental Tales, is another example of the Romantic Orientalism genre.

Although these works were purportedly non-fiction, they were notoriously unreliable. Many of these accounts provided detailed descriptions of market places, trading and commerce. Examples of travel writing include: Les Mysteres de L'Egypte Devoiles by Olympe Audouard published in 1865 and Jacques Majorelle's Road Trip Diary of a Painter in the Atlas and the Anti-Atlas published in 1922

=== Gallery of paintings and drawings ===
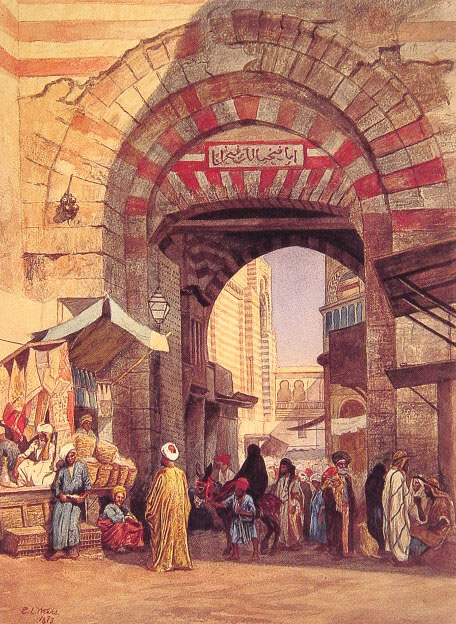
The Moorish Bazaar, painting by Edwin Lord Weeks, 1873

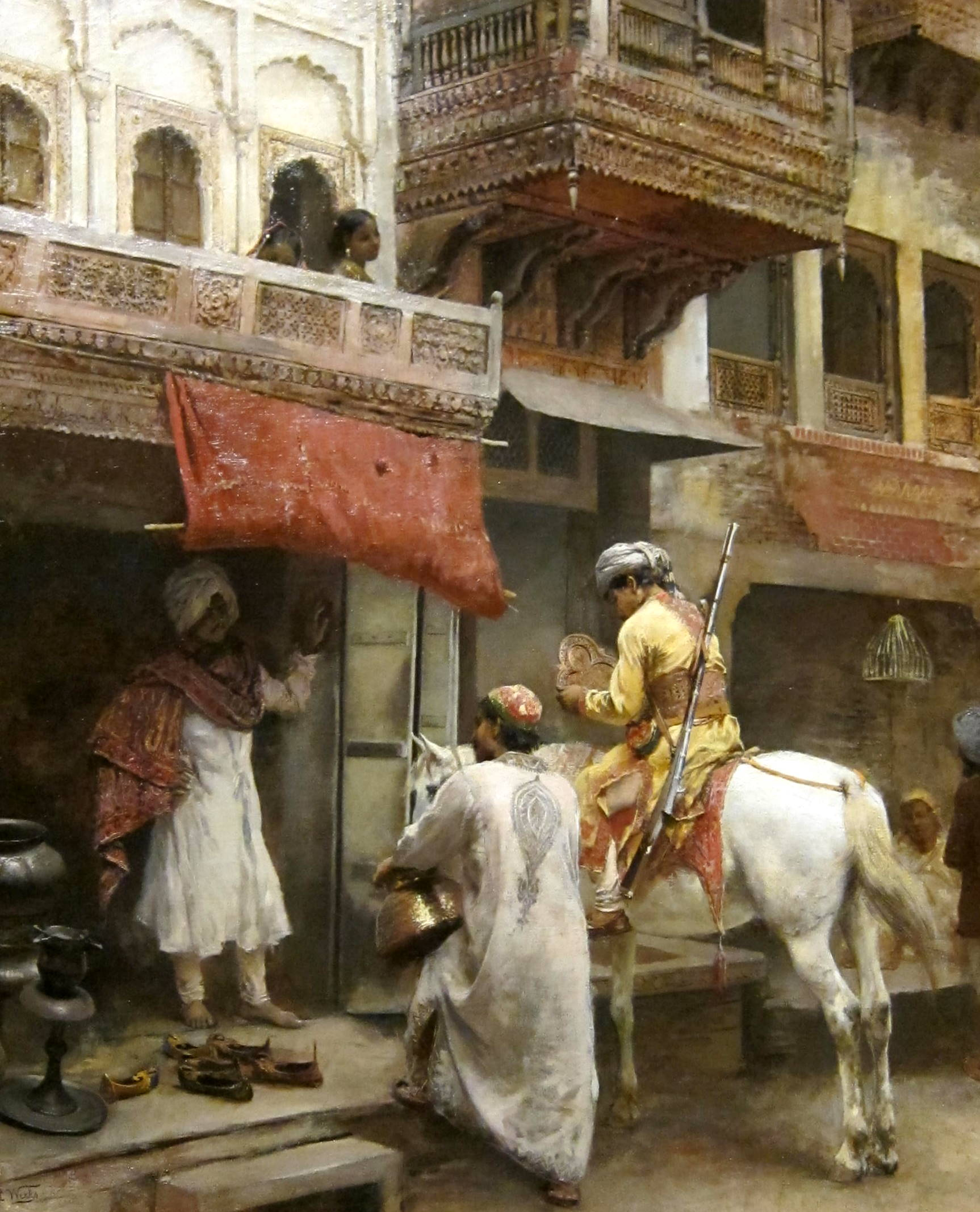
Street Scene in India, by Edwin Lord Weeks, circa 1885

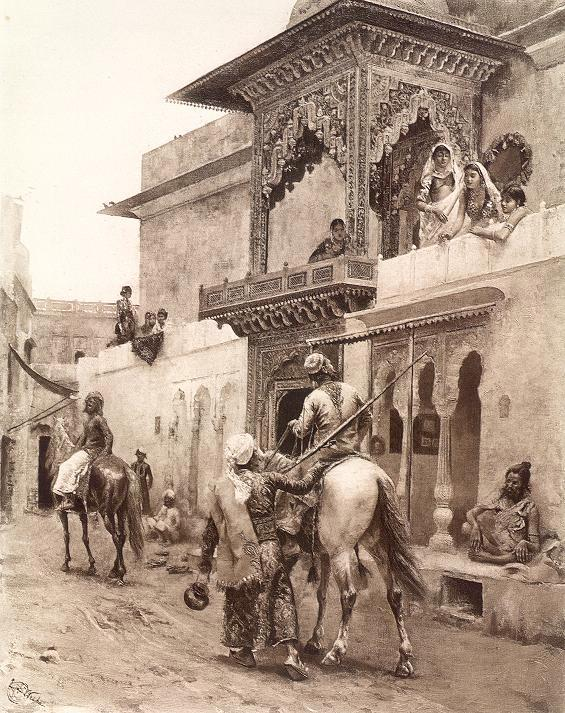
Cashmere Travellers in a Street of Delhi by Edwin Lord Weeks, 1880s

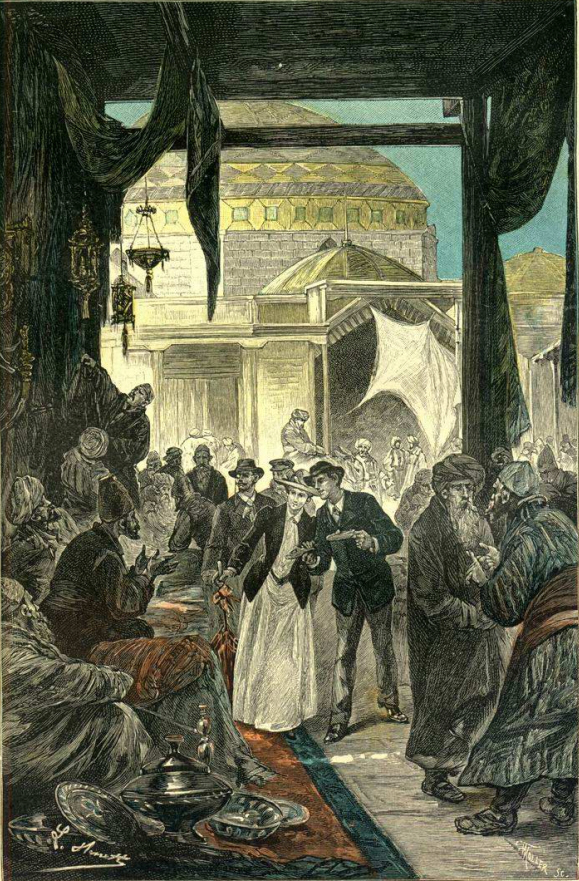
Bazaar in Samarkand, illustration by Léon Benett for a Jules Verne novel, 1893

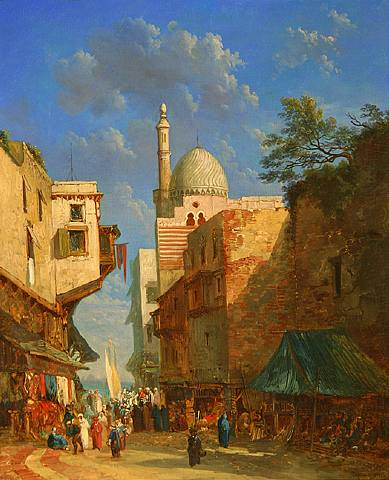
The Bazaar, by Alexandre Defaux, 1856

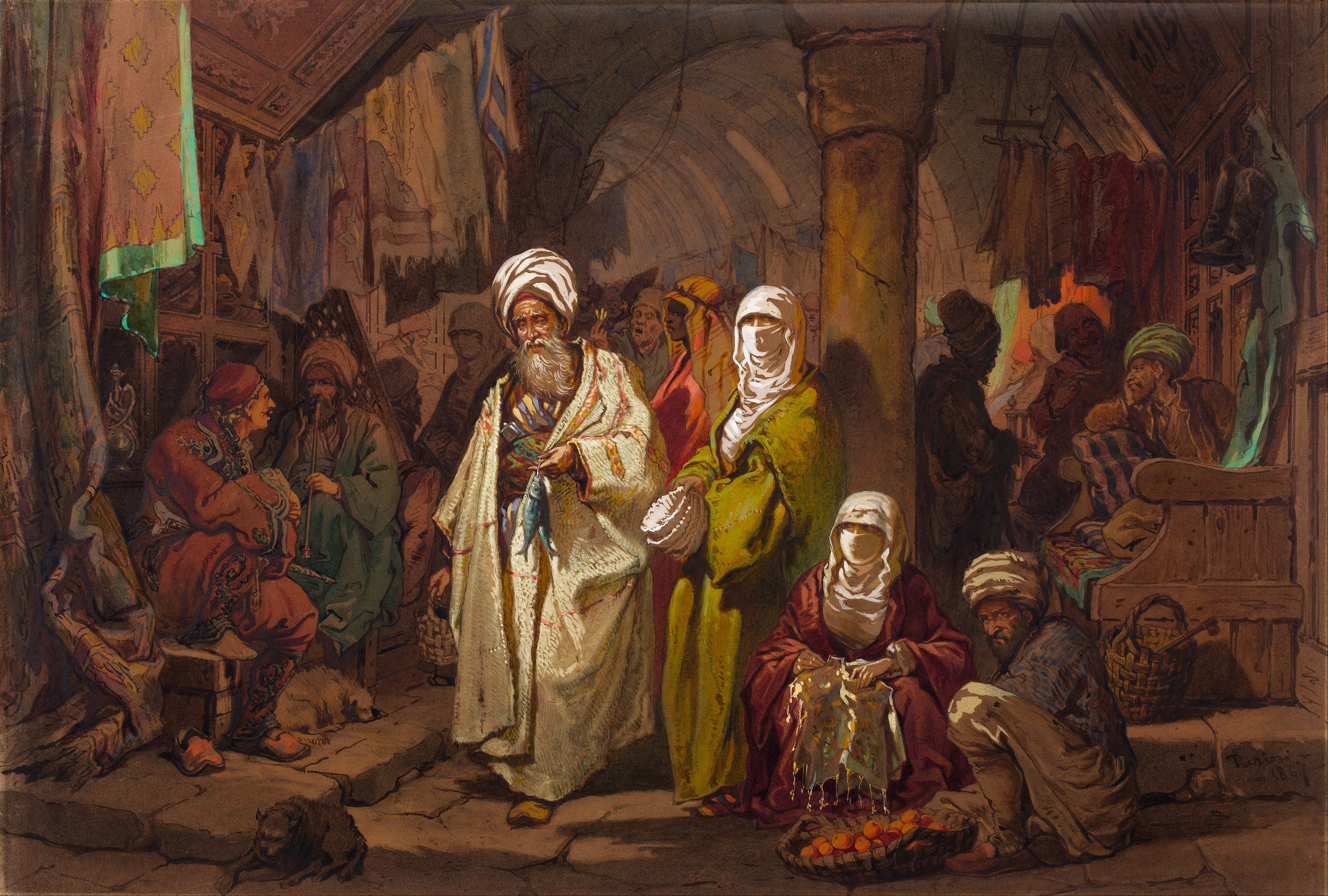
The Grand Bazaar, Istanbul, by Amadeo Preziosi, late 19th century

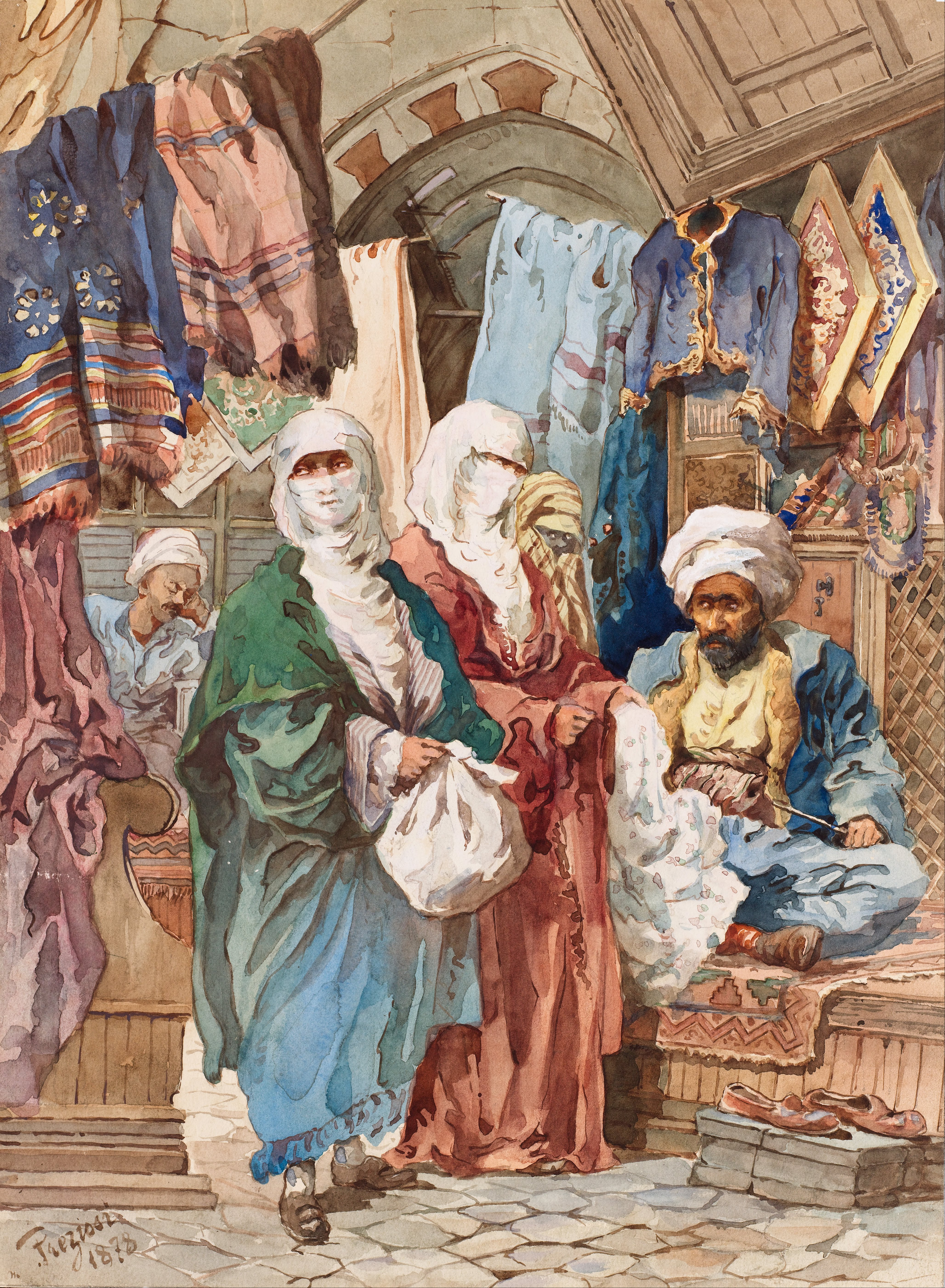
The Silk Bazaar by Amedeo Preziosi, late 19th century

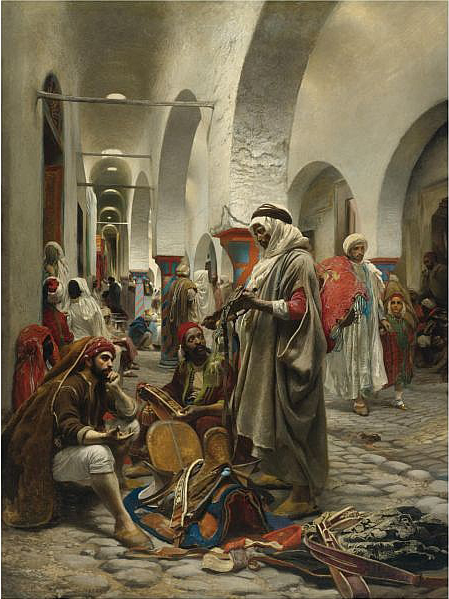
Souk des étoffes, Tunis by Anton Robert Leinweber, before 1921

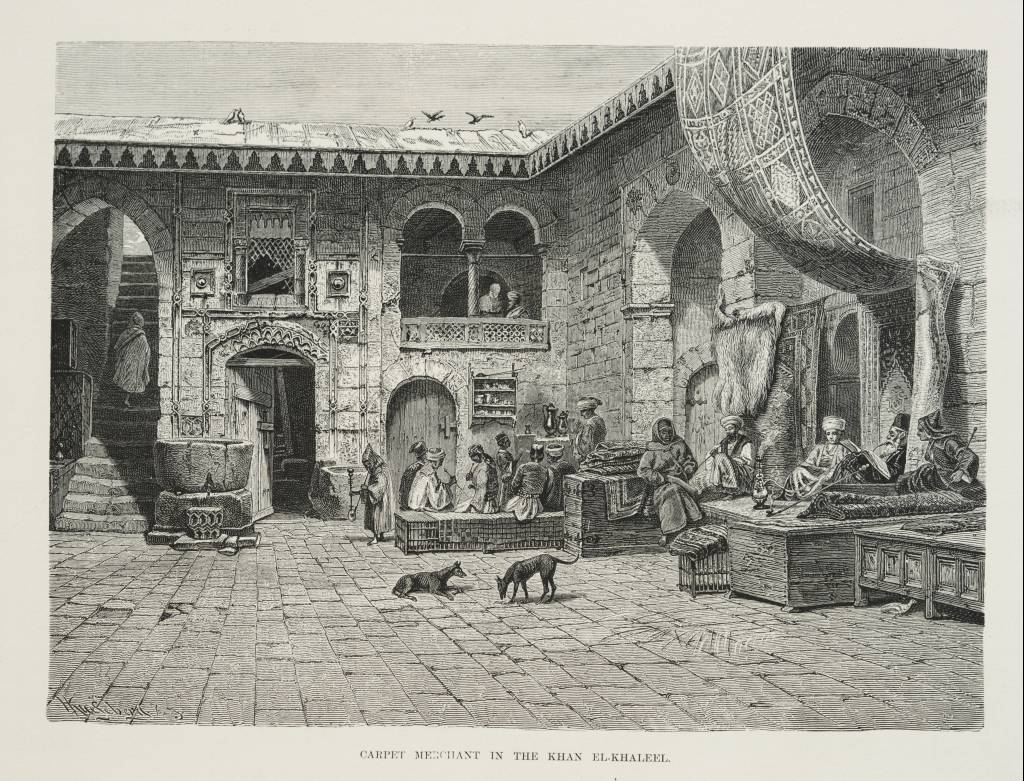
Carpet Merchant in the Khan el Khaleel, from Georg Ebers, Egypt: Descriptive, Historical, and Picturesque, Vol. 1, 1878

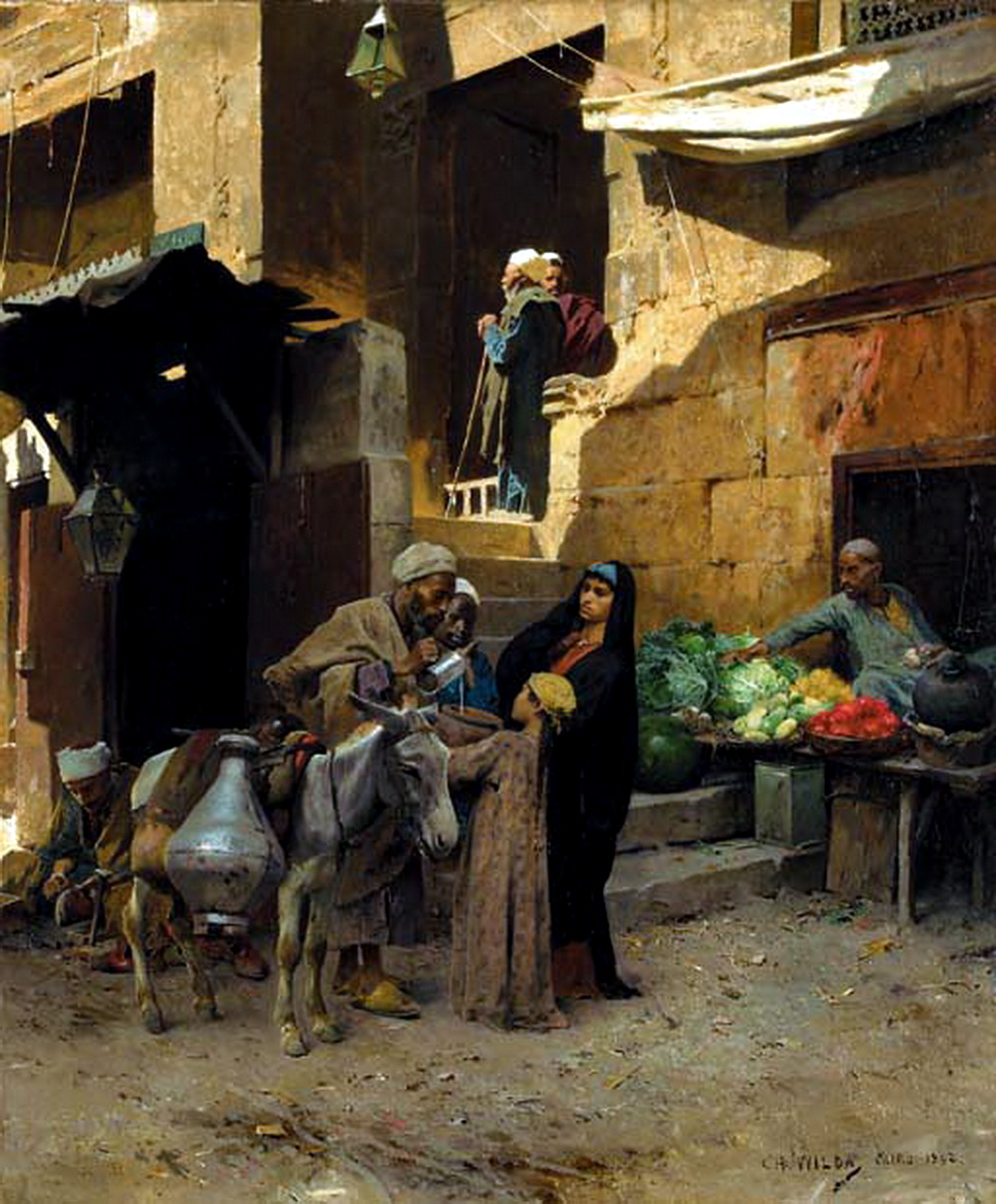
Inside the Souk, Cairo by Charles Wilda, 1892

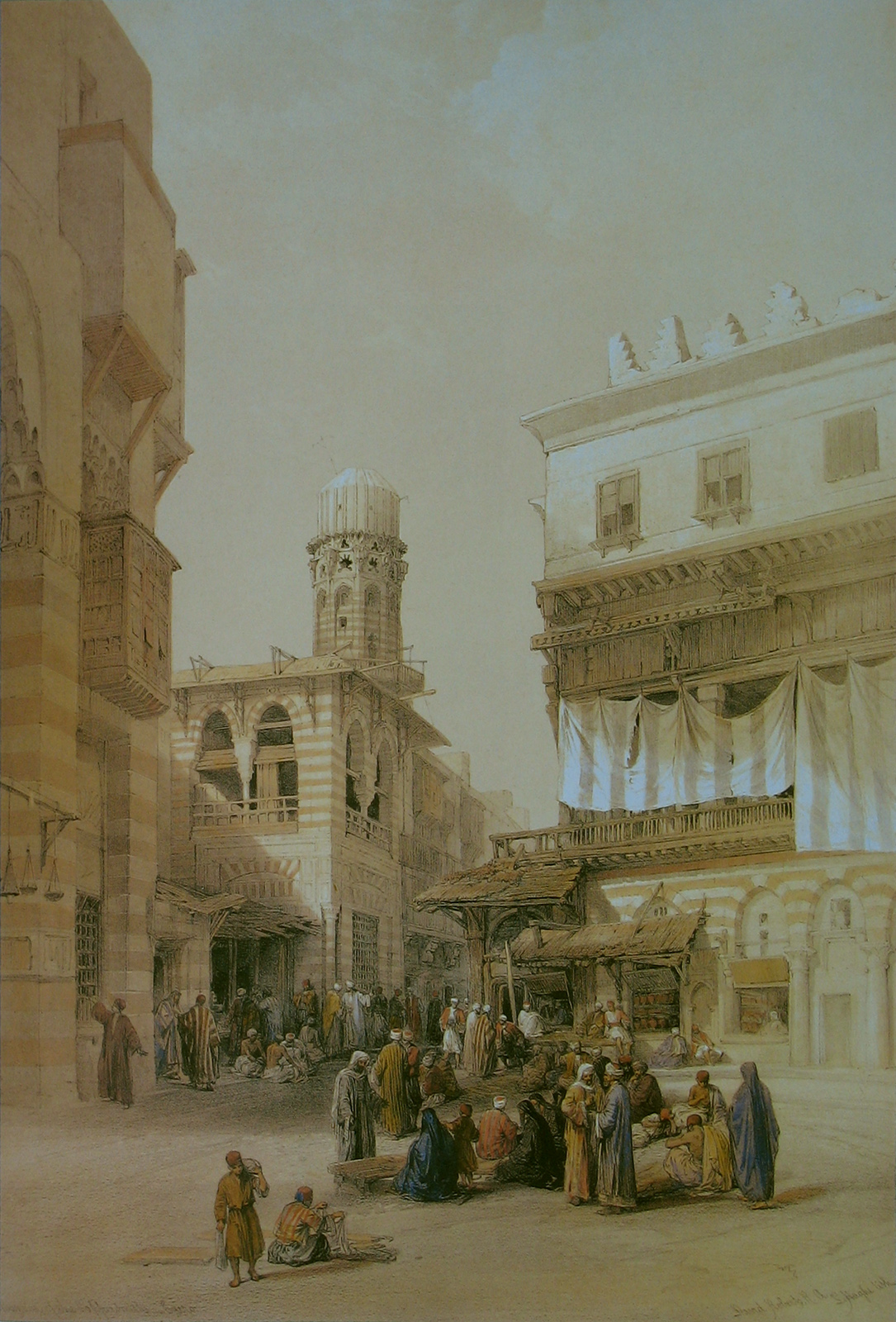
Bazaar of the Coppersmiths in Cairo by David Roberts, 1838

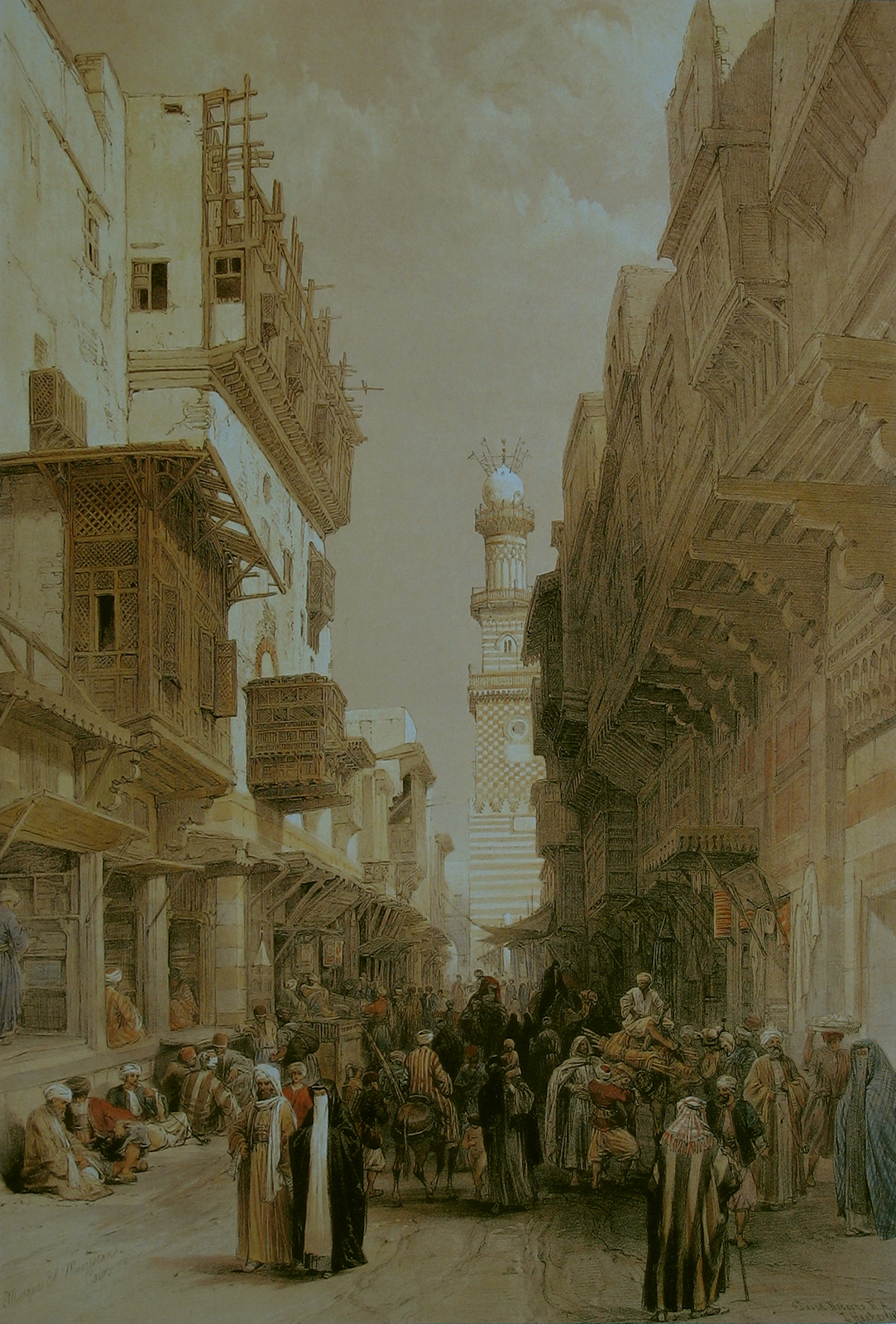
Bazaar El Moo Ristan in Cairo, by David Roberts, 1838

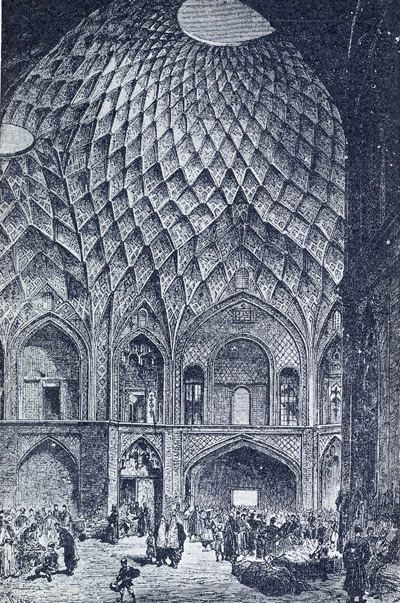
Timcheh Amin-o-Dowleh in the Kashan Bazaar, Iran, c. 1800

== See also ==
- List of Orientalist artists
- Bazaari

Types of markets, bazaars and souks:

- Haat bazaar – (also known as a hat) an open air bazaar or market in South Asia.
- Indoor swap meet - a regional American term for a bazaar-like market.
- Landa bazaar – a terminal market or market for second hand goods (South Asia)
- Meena Bazaar – a bazaar that raises money for non-profit organisations.
- Pasar malam – a night market in Malaysia, Indonesia and Singapore that opens in the evening, typically held in the street in residential neighbourhoods.
- Pasar pagi – a morning market, typically a wet market that trades from dawn until midday, found in Malaysia, Indonesia and Singapore.
- Shōtengai – a style of Japanese commercial district, typically in the form of a local market street that is closed to vehicular traffic.

Markets and retail in general:

- Marketplace
- Shopping mall
- Arcade – a covered passageway with stores along one or both sides.
- History of marketing
