= Mayabazar (disambiguation) =

Mayabazar is a 1957 Indian epic fantasy film.

Mayabazar or Maya Bazar may also refer to these in Indian cinema:

- Mayabazar: Music from the Motion Picture, soundtrack of the 1957 film
- Mayabazar (1936 film)
- Mayabazaar 1995, a 1995 Tamil-language film
- Maya Bazar (2006 film)
- Mayabazar (2008 film)
- Mayabazar 2016, a 2020 Kannada-language film

== See also ==
- Maya (disambiguation)
- Bazar (disambiguation)
- Maya Bazar, Faizabad, a town in Uttar Pradesh, India
- "Maya Bazaaru", a song by Srikanth and Koti from the 2011 Indian film Katha Screenplay Darsakatvam Appalaraju
- Maya Bazaar For Sale, an Indian TV series
