= Bizzarro (surname) =

Bizzarro is an Italian surname. Notable people with this surname include:

- Gennaro Bizzarro (born 1975/1976), member of the Connecticut Senate
- Ryan Bizzarro (born 1985), member of the Pennsylvania House of Representatives

== See also ==
- Bizarro (disambiguation)
- Bazzaro, a similar surname
