= Bizarre Bazaar =

Bizarre Bazaar or variation, may refer to:

== Television ==
- "Bizarre Bazaar" (Amphibia), an episode of Amphibia
- "Bizarre Bazaar", an episode of Beetlejuice; see List of Beetlejuice episodes
- "Bizaare Bazaar", an episode of Digimon; see List of Digimon episodes and films

== Events ==
- Bizarre Bazaar, an event attraction at Universal Studios Singapore for Universal's Halloween Horror Nights
- Bizarre Bazaar, an event at the Whitby Goth Weekend

== Other uses ==
- "Bizarre Bazaar", a 1991 song by Ozric Tentacles off the album Strangeitude

== See also ==
- Bazaar Bizarre, a 2004 documentary about Robert Berdella
- Bazaar of the Bizarre, a 1963 sword and sorcery novelette by Fritz Leiber
- Bazaar of the Bizarre (short story collection), a 1978 anthology by Fritz Leiber
- Bazaar (disambiguation)
- Bizarre (disambiguation)
