= Aha Naa Pellanta =

Aha Naa Pellanta (lit. 'Aha My Wedding') may refer to:

- "Aha Naa Pellanta", a song from the soundtrack album of the 1957 Indian film Mayabazar
- Aha Naa-Pellanta! (1987 film), a 1987 Indian Telugu-language comedy film
- Aha Naa Pellanta! (2011 film), a 2011 Indian Telugu-language comedy film
- Aha Naa Pellanta (web series), a 2022 Indian Telugu-language comedy web series
