= Bazar =

Bazar may refer to:

- Bazar, Afghanistan
- Bazar, Azerbaijan
- Bazar, Mardan, Pakistan
- Bazar, Ukraine

In Iran

- Bazar, East Azerbaijan
- Bazar, Gilan
- Bazareh-ye Qarnas, North Khorasan Province
- Bazargah, Qazvin, Qazvin Province
- Bazar, South Khorasan

In Poland

- Bazar, Łódź Voivodeship (central Poland)
- Bazar, Lublin Voivodeship (east Poland)
- Bazar, Masovian Voivodeship (east-central Poland)

== See also ==
- Bazaar (disambiguation)
