= Bazaar (disambiguation) =

A bazaar or landa bazaar is a permanent marketplace or street of shops.

Bazaar may also refer to:

== Places ==
- Bazaar, Kansas, an unincorporated community in the United States
- Namche Bazaar, Nepal
- De Bazaar Beverwijk Bazaar, Netherlands

== Books ==
- "The Bazaar", short story and short story collection by Martin Armstrong 1924
- "The Bazaar", short story and short story collection by Elizabeth Bowen

== Film and TV ==
- Bazaar (1949 film), a 1949 Indian Hindi language family-drama film directed by K. Amarnath
- Bazaar (1982 film), a 1982 Indian film directed by Sagar Sarhadi
- Bazaar (2019 film), a 2019 Indian Kannada film by Suni

== Music ==
- Bazaar (band), a Danish band
- Bazaar (album), a 2014 album by Wampire
- "The Bazaar", a 1995 song by The Tea Party

== Brands ==
- GNU Bazaar, a software tool for distributed source code management
- Bazaar (supermarkets), a supermarket chain in Greece
- Bazaar, an open source software development model described in the essay The Cathedral and the Bazaar
- Harper's Bazaar, an American fashion magazine

== See also ==
- Bazar (disambiguation)
- Sadar Bazaar (disambiguation)
- Bizarre (disambiguation)
- Bizaar, a 2000 album by Insane Clown Posse
