= Bizarro (disambiguation) =

Bizarro is a supervillain who appears in comic books published by DC Comics.

Bizarro or Bizzarro may also refer to:

== Genre ==
- Evil twin, the stock character type of which Superman's Bizarro is an example
- Bizarro fiction, since 2005 a genre of underground literature

== Music ==
- Bizarro (album), a 1989 album by the rock group The Wedding Present

== People ==
- Bruno Bizarro (born 1979), Portuguese composer
- Carlos Eduardo Bizarro (born 1980), Brazilian footballer
- Gennaro Bizzarro (born 1976), American politician
- Ryan Bizzarro (born 1985), American politician

== Physical entertainment ==
- Bizarro, a former name of the roller coaster Medusa (Six Flags Great Adventure) from 2009 to 2022
- Bizarro, a former name of the roller coaster Superman The Ride at Six Flags New England from 2009 to 2015

== Print media ==
- Bizarro (novel), an unfinished novel by Sir Walter Scott begun in 1832 and published posthumously in 2008
- Bizarro (comic strip), since 1985 a daily comic strip by Dan Piraro

== Television episodes ==
- "Bizarro" (Supergirl), 2016
- "Bizarro" (Sealab 2021), 2002

== See also ==
- Bazzaro, an Italian surname
- Bizarra, a counterpart to DC Comics' Wonder Woman
