= The Thing in the Moonlight =

- Short story by H. P. Lovecraft
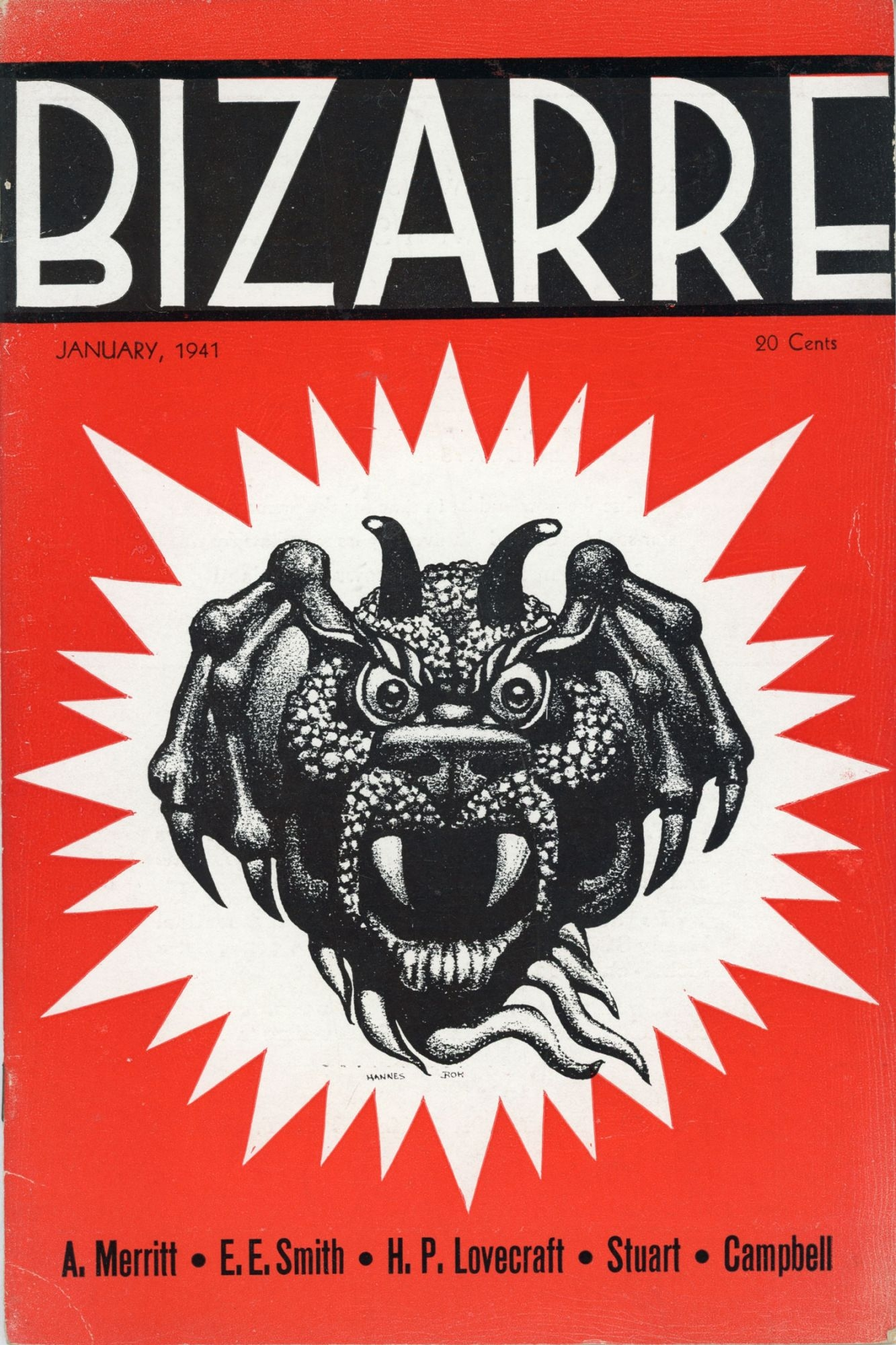
- Cover of the magazine in which it was first published

Text available at Wikisource
- Country: United States
- Language: English
- Genre: Fantasy short story

Publication
- Published in: Bizarre
- Publication type: Magazine
- Publication date: January 1941

"The Thing in the Moonlight" is a short story by J. Chapman Miske. The story is based on a letter dated November 24, 1927 from H. P. Lovecraft to Donald Wandrei describing one of Lovecraft's dreams. The story was prepared for publication by Miske, who filled in the story surrounding the description of the dream. In places, the letter and published story are identical to Lovecraft's style. It was first published in Bizarre magazine in January 1941.

== Plot ==
Morgan, the protagonist, is an illiterate man. One evening, Morgan is sitting alone and suddenly feels compelled to start writing. Despite his illiteracy, he records the dream of Howard Phillips, another man. In Morgan's writing, Phillips says that he fell asleep on November 24, 1927, and has never reawakened.

The dream's setting takes place in a strange marshland. Phillips explores the marsh's cliff side, noting the eerie and mouth-like caves dotting the plateau. Eventually, Phillips encounters a set of railway tracks. On these tracks he finds "a yellow, vestibuled car numbered 1852—of a plain, double-trucked type common from 1900 to 1910." This car is able to start and he climbs aboard, searching for a light switch so that he can see better. He hears a noise behind him, and, turning to look, sees two men (assumed to be the motorman and conductor) approach him. The first man lifts his head to the sky, sniffs, and howls, while the second drops to all fours and charges toward the Phillips and the car. Phillips immediately flees out of the car until he is too tired to continue.

Phillips reveals that the reason for his terror was not "because the conductor had dropped on all fours, but because the face of the motorman was a mere white cone tapering to one blood-red-tentacle..."

Phillips is aware that it is a dream, but is unable to wake up. During the day, he travels the strange land, and each night, is brought back to the place with the train car. He always alerts the howling beast to his presence, and always flees from it.

The narrator closes the story by saying that he would visit Phillips' house in Providence, but fears what he might find.

== Publication history ==
- "The Thing in the Moonlight" was first published in Bizarre magazine in January 1941.
- In 1962, it was published in Dreams and Fancies (Arkham House 1962).
- In 1970, it was published in The Tomb and Other Tales by Ballantine Books.
- In 1995, it was published again in Dreams of Terror and Death: The Dream Cycle of H. P. Lovecraft by Ballantine Books.
- In 2005, it was published again in Shadows of Death by Del Rey Books.
- In 2011, it was published again in Eldritch Tales: A Miscellany of the Macabre by Victor Gollancz Ltd.
