= Dreams and Fancies =

1962 short story collection by H. P. Lovecraft

- Dust-jacket illustration by Richard Taylor for Dreams and Fancies
- Author: H. P. Lovecraft
- Cover artist: Richard Taylor
- Language: English
- Genre: Fantasy, Horror, Science fiction short stories, letters
- Publisher: Arkham House
- Publication date: 1962
- Publication place: United States
- Media type: Print (hardback)
- Pages: x, 174 pp

Dreams and Fancies is a collection of letters and fantasy, horror and science fiction short stories by American author H. P. Lovecraft. It was released in 1962 by Arkham House in an edition of 2,030 copies and was the sixth collection of Lovecraft's work to be released by Arkham House.

The concept of the collection was to present letters by Lovecraft recounting dreams, and the stories which may have derived from those dreams. It also includes fragments of letters from Lovecraft to various correspondence in which his dreams are discussed.

== Contents ==
Dreams and Fancies contains the following tales:

1. "Introduction", by August Derleth
2. "Dreams and Fancies" (letters to: Rheinhart Kleiner, Maurice W. Moe, Alfred Galpin, Bernard Austin Dwyer, Donald Wandrei, Clark Ashton Smith, Duane W. Rimel, R.H. Barlow, William Lumley, Willis Connover, Jr. and Virgil Finlay)
3. "Memory"
4. "The Statement of Randolph Carter"
5. "Celephais"
6. "The Doom That Came to Sarnath"
7. "Nyarlathotep"
8. "The Evil Clergyman"
9. "The Thing in the Moonlight"
10. "The Shadow Out of Time"
