= French ship Bizarre =

Bizarre has been the name of three ships of the French Navy:

- French frigate Bizarre (1672), launched in 1672 and sold in 1694
- French ship Bizarre (1692), launched in 1692 and broken up in 1727
- French ship Bizarre (1751), launched in 1751 and wrecked in 1782
