= Bazargah, Qazvin =

Bazargah بازرگاه
- Village
- Location within Iran
- Coordinates: 36°36′56″N 49°56′45″E
- Country: Iran
- Province: Qazvin
- County: Qazvin
- Bakhsh: Alamut-e Gharbi
- Rural District: Dastjerd

Population (2006)
  - Total: 30
- Time zone: UTC+3:30 (IRST)
  - Summer (DST): UTC+4:30 (IRDT)

Bazargah (Persian: بازرگاه, also Romanized as Bāzargāh and Bāzargā; also known as Bāzargān and Bāzār) is a village in Dastjerd Rural District, Alamut-e Gharbi District, Qazvin County, Qazvin Province, Iran. At the 2006 census, its population was 30, in 11 families.
