= French ship Bizarre (1692) =

Ship of the line of the French Navy

History

France
- Name: Bizarre
- Owner: 1691
- Builder: Bayonne
- Laid down: May 1691
- Launched: Autumn 1692
- Commissioned: May 1693
- Fate: Taken to pieces in December 1727

General characteristics
- Tonnage: 1,100
- Length: 145 French feet 4 inches (Note: The French (pre-metric) foot and inch were 6.575% longer than the equivalent English foot and inch.) (gundeck) 124½ French feet (keel)
- Beam: 39½ French feet
- Draught: 18-24½ French feet
- Depth of hold: 16 French feet 8 inches
- Complement: 400 men (320 in peacetime), + 8 officers
- Armament: 68 guns

Bizarre was a second rank two-decker ship of the line of the French Royal Navy. She was armed with 68 guns, comprising twenty-six 24-pounder guns on the lower deck and twenty-eight 12-pounder guns on the upper deck, with eight 6-pounder guns on the quarterdeck and six 6-pounder guns on the forecastle.

Designed and built under contract by Félix Arnaud, she was begun at Bayonne in May 1691. She was launched in the autumn of 1692 and completed in May 1693.

Bizarre took part in the Battle of Lagos on 28 June 1693. In July 1707 she was scuttled at Toulon to avoid capture by the English and Dutch squadron during the attack on that port but was refloated. unserviceable by 1718, she was retained at Toulon until 1727 when she was taken to pieces by the end of that year.
