= Bruno Bizarro =

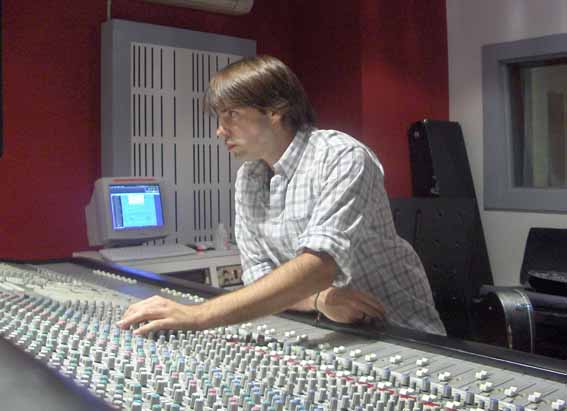

Background information
- Born: Bruno Ricardo Ferreira Bizarro
- Origin: Portugal
- Genres: Film scores, Video Game Music, stage play music, Orchestral, Electronic Music, Synthwave, Funk, Sound Design, Cosmic Horror
- Occupations: Composer, Audio Engineer, Music Producer, Creative Consultant
- Instruments: Piano, Keyboards, Percussion, Theremin
- Years active: 2004–present
- Labels: VC Filmes, Independent
- Website: http://brunobizarro.com

'Bruno Bizarro is a Portuguese composer, often for film soundtracks. He is also a Graduate Audio Engineer, Music Producer, Songwriter and Arranger.

== Biography ==
In addition to a great deal of self-education, Bizarro studied music while attending the Regional Conservatoire of Sobreda in Portugal, choir and classical piano with professor Luís Pinto and took personal classes with professor Jorge Santos and Lucía del Campo and attended Master Classes at the Royal College of Music in London.

He received the Audio Engineering Diploma at SAE (School of Audio Engineering) in Madrid, Spain, where he was also a supervising monitor.

While studying at SAE, he was one of the winners of the Mackie Traktion Contest.

Bizarro has attended several workshops and had classes with relevant professional people in the Music Industry, Music Production and Audio Engineering, such as, Tó Pinheiro ( Portuguese Mastering Engineer), Manolo Aguilar (former director of BMG ARIOLA), Nick Litwin (Argentine Mastering Engineer), Michel Martin (Spanish Audio Engineer), Florian A. Schober (German Composer and Music Producer), Ulf Ding (German Pianist), and others.

His final thesis was about Film Music with the title "Un poco sobre bandas sonoras…y análisis de la música de algunas películas" (A bit about Soundtracks and analysis of some film music).

The year after SAE graduation, he was a trainee at RTVE (Radio Televisión Española) in the departments of RNE in Radio, Recording/Mixing Classical and Pop Music Studios.

He frequently works with actor/director/screenwriter António Rodrigues, an old friend with whom he maintains a strong professional relationship.

Bizarro has also been a piano and keyboard player, music producer and arranger for several bands.

== Awards ==
- Won the Indiewise Film Festival's Best Music Score Award in 2016 with "Σ 537: A Phobian Machine Experiment" music. 2016
- Won the Best Soundtrack Award at MiMo Milano Mobile Film Fest in 2018 with "Audiotales - The Fright Before Christmas" music. 2018
- Won Audience Award at Gardunha Fest in 2018 with "Audiotales - By Hand of The Monster" (as a Producer). 2018
- Nominated for Best Original Score at Feel The Reel Independent Film Festival in 2017 with "Eden" music. 2017
- Nominated for Best Original Score or Use of Music (Nomination) at Knoxville Film Festival with "Legacy" music. 2021
- Nominated for Best Soundtrack at MiMo Milano Mobile Film Festival with Audiotales - "It Still Knows My Name" music 2019

== Albums/EPS/Singles ==
Released "What's Left?" Original Soundtrack Album on 6 March 2021.

Released "Running Away From What" Single on 11 November 2022.

Released "Centaurianaut" Single on 17 November 2023.

== Filmography ==
Composer

1. - "Doorways" (2024)
2. - "There's Always Tomorrow" (2023)
3. - "Twins in Crime" (2023)
4. - "Padre" (2023)
5. - "Legacy" (2021)
6. - "Sailing Over the Sun" (2021)
7. - "The Barn" (2020)
8. - "What's Left? (2020)
9. - "How long have you not seen a Portuguese film?" (TV Commercial for The Portuguese Academy of Cinema)
10. - "Audiotales" (Webseries) (2017 - ongoing)
11. - "Audiotales 80's Bash"(trailer) (2017)
12. - "Σ 537: A Phobian Machine Experiment" (2016)
13. - "Eden" (2016)
14. - "God Ex Machina"(Theatre Play/Film)(2016)
15. - "No Fim da Linha" (2015)
16. - "Shell" (2012)
17. - "Verbo Muller" (Theatre Play - music composed for video) (2011)
18. - "O Último Tesouro" TV Series (2011)
19. - "VC Produções Audiovisuais" (2009)
20. - "The Dictator's Secret Passions" (2009)
21. - "A Vida Privada de Salazar" (2009)
22. - "Merry Christmas" (2008)
23. - "Meia-Noite " (2008)
24. - "Substantia" (2007)
25. - "Merry Christmas On the Lot Version" (2007)
26. - "Eco" (2006)
27. - "Mayo" (2005)
28. - "Niño Migraña" (2005)
29. - "The Heart of the Dragon trailer" (2005)
30. - "The Challenge" (2004)
31. - "Aurea Pictures Presentation" for SAE (2003)
32. - "Quimera" (2001) (*)
33. - "O Rosto da Traição" (2000) (*)

(*)- Projects not concluded.

All soundtracks (music) composed, produced, arranged and orchestrated by Bizarro

Music Department

1. - "Meia-Noite" (as Music Supervisor) (2008)
2. - "Osa Meri" TV commercial (as Music Producer) (2005)
3. - "Party of Four 2" (as Music Supervisor) (1998)
4. - "Arriba Fossil Documentary" (as Music Supervisor) (1997)

Sound Department

1. - "I'm All Set" (TV Series) (2019) (Sound Design, Audio Engineer)
2. - "Los Bentos" (2012) (Foley Artist and Sound Design)
3. - "Dance of Displeasure" (2010) (Foley Artist and Additional sound)
4. - "Eco" (Sound Editing, Mixing, Mastering and Foley artist) (2006)
5. - "Formation Video for O Celeiro" (Perchista) (2005)
6. - "Aurea Pictures Presentation" for SAE (Recording, Sound Design, Sound Editing)(2003)
7. - "Arriba Fossil Documentary" (Narrator) (1997)

Image Department/Assistant/Others

1. -"Los Bentos" (assistant director) (2012)
2. -"Party of Four 2" (Camera Operator) (1998)
3. -"Arriba Fossil Documentary" (Camera Operator) (1997)

Director

1. -"Party of Four 2" (1998)
2. -"Arriba Fossil Documentary" (1997)

Producer

1. -"Audiotales" (Webseries) (2017- ongoing)
2. -"Shell" (2012)
3. -"Los Bentos" (2012)
4. -"Party of Four 2" (1998)
5. -"Arriba Fossil Documentary" (1997)

Actor/Extra/Cameos

1. -"Los Bento" - Spectator (2012) (post-production)
2. -"POF" - Dionysius (2012) (pre-production)
3. -"Shell" - WC User (cameo)(2011) (post-production)
4. -"Quimera" - Demon (2001) (*)
5. -"O Rosto da Traição" - Marco (2000) (*)
6. -"Party of Four 2" - Dionysius (1998)

(*)- Project not concluded
