= Bizarre (1941 magazine) =

Semi-professional science fiction magazine

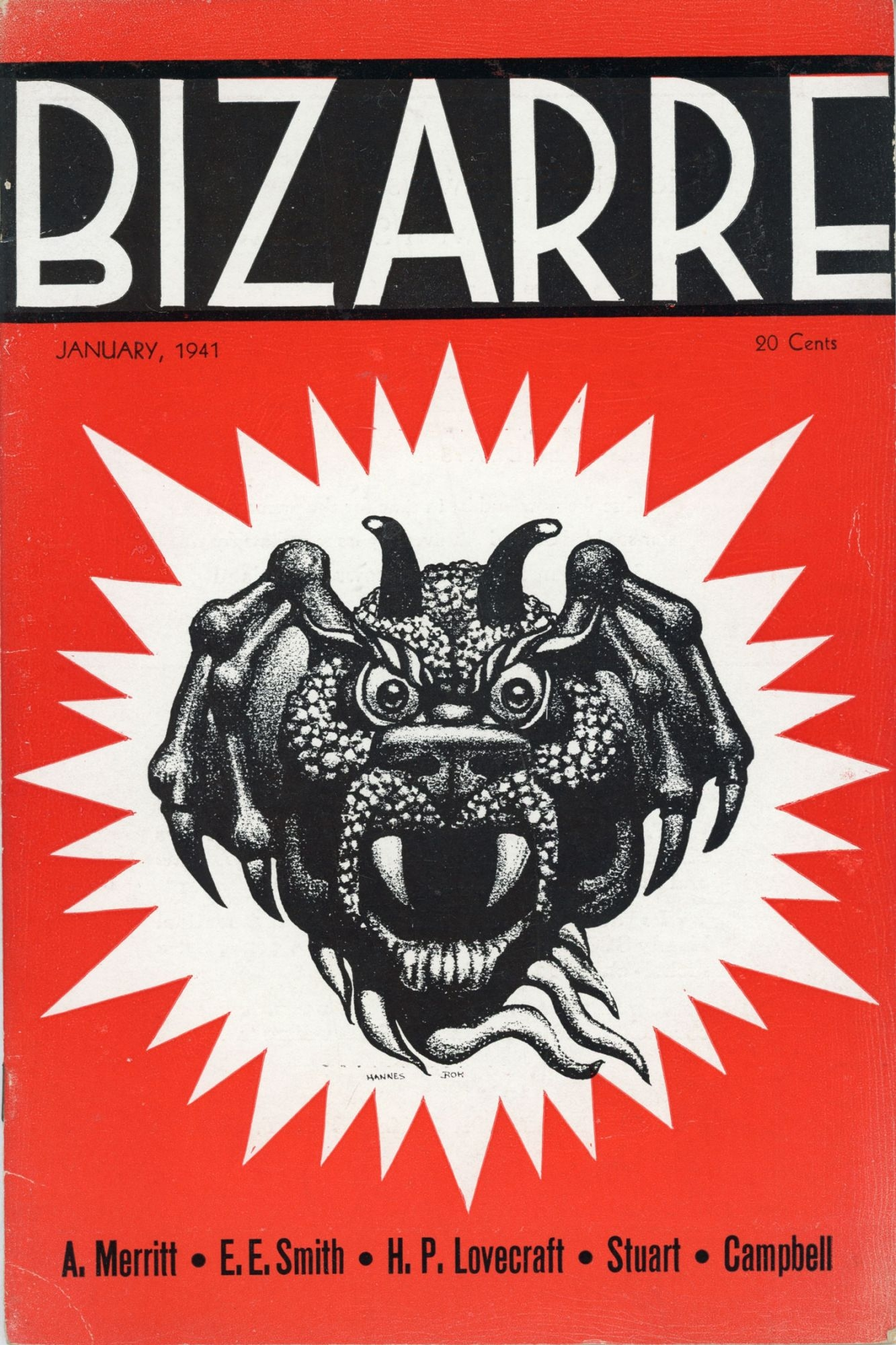
Cover of the only issue, by Hannes Bok

Bizarre was a semi-professional science fiction magazine that produced a single issue in 1941. It was published by two science fiction fans, Walter E. Marconette and Jack Chapman Miske. It was the continuation of Scienti-Snaps, a fanzine which Marconette had launched in January 1938, with Miske joining him as editor in August 1939. Another fan, William Hamling, had produced a semi-professional magazine, Stardust, the previous year, and Marconette and Miske contacted Hamling and obtained his help in assembling Bizarre. Science fiction historian Howard DeVore suggests that the two editors were planning to turn the magazine into a fully professional enterprise, but the only issue they produced included much fan-oriented material.

There were only two stories in the magazine. One was "The Thing in the Moonlight", a fragment by H.P. Lovecraft, and the other, by A. Merritt, was the original ending to his novel Dwellers in the Mirage. The novel had been published with a different ending in Argosy in 1932; the ending in Bizarre is the one used in modern editions. The non-fiction including an autobiographical piece by Hannes Bok, who also contributed the cover art; an essay by E.E. Smith, and an article on writing by John W. Campbell (his pseudonym 'Don A Stuart' is listed on the cover).

A second issue, to be dated March 1941, was announced in the editorial, but it did not appear, and DeVore speculates that the costs were too great for Marconette to continue.

== Bibliographic details ==
The publishers and editors were Walter E. Marconette and Jack Chapman Miske; the magazine was printed in Cleveland, Ohio. The single issue was dated January 1941, and was numbered volume 4, issue 1, continuing the numeration of Scienti-Snaps. It was digest-sized, 22 pages long, and priced at 20 cents.

== Sources ==
- DeVore, Howard (1985). "Bizarre". In Tymn, Marshall B.; Ashley, Mike (eds.). Science Fiction, Fantasy and Weird Fiction Magazines. Westport, Connecticut: Greenwood Press. pp. 143–145. ISBN 0-3132-1221-X.
- Moskowitz, Sam (1974). The Immortal Storm. Westport, Connecticut: Hyperion. ISBN 0-88355-160-8.
