= Olympe Audouard =

French feminist

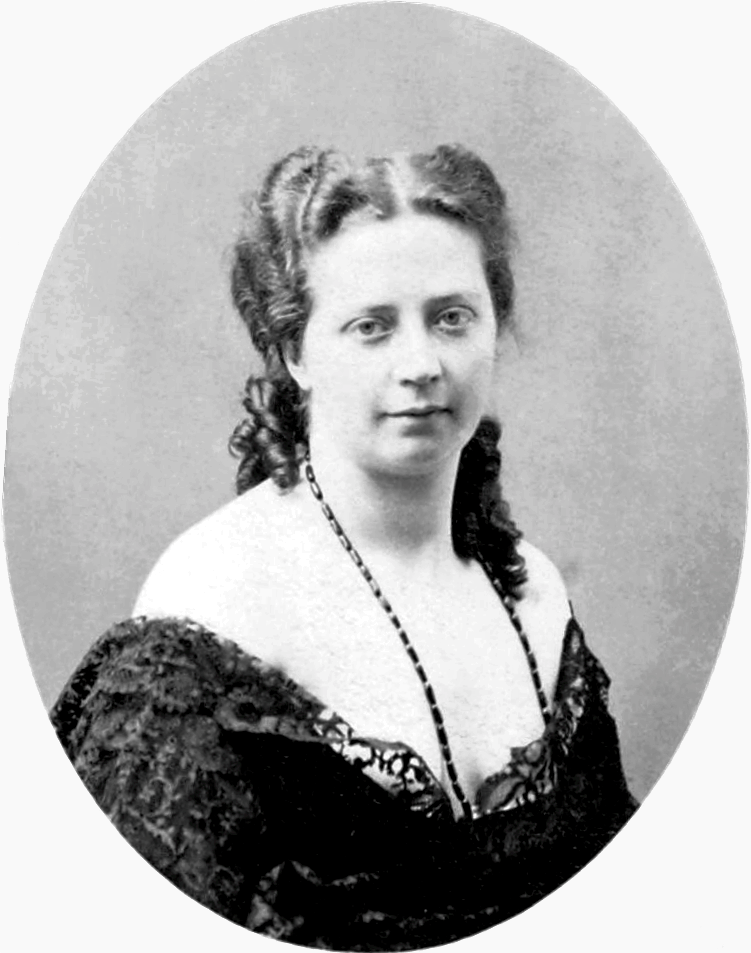
- Born: Félicité-Olympe de Jouval; 13 March 1832; Marseille, France
- Died: 12 January 1890 (aged 57)
- Occupation: feminist
- Known for: demanded complete equality for women, including the rights to vote and to stand for election; founder of the newspaper Le Papillon
- Notable work: L'Orient et ses peuplades
- Spouse: Henri-Alexis Audouard (m. 1850; div. 1885)

Olympe Audouard (13 March 1832 – 12 January 1890) was a French feminist who demanded complete equality for women, including the rights to vote and to stand for election.

Born in Marseille as Félicité-Olympe de Jouval, she married on 11 April 1850 the lawyer Henri-Alexis Audouard (b. 2 May 1829). The couple separated in 1858, but was divorced only in 1885, shortly after the French divorce law (the "loi Naquet") had finally been passed on 27 July 1884. Audouard was the founder of the newspaper Le Papillon, one of only two feminist newspapers in France that supported Naquet's divorce laws.

== Selected works ==
- Audouard, Olympe (1867). L'Orient et ses peuplades. Paris: E. Dentu.
