= Bizarre (band) =

- Origin: Blanes, Catalonia
- Genres: Rock
- Years active: 2003-present
- Members: Javier García; Alfonso Montaño; Jordi Bonastre; Meritxell Marín; Billy Purdie; Manuel García
- Website: www.bizarresound.com

Bizarre are a rock band from Blanes, Catalonia, Spain. They are best known in their country by their 2006 hit single "Sé", which is widely played not only in Catalonia and Spain but also in some Latin American countries.

Although their songs are mostly sung in Spanish, several of them have been also recorded in Catalan ("Sé", "Difícil d'oblidar", "No és massa tard", "T'amagues"...), English ("Alone in NY" and some unreleased demos) and Italian ("So").

Bizarre have released up to date two albums: their debut Bizarre (Mass Records, 2006) and Zero (Mass Records, 2010).

== Discography ==
- Bizarre (Mass Records, 2006)
- Zero (Mass Records, 2010)
