= Alexandre Defaux =

French artist

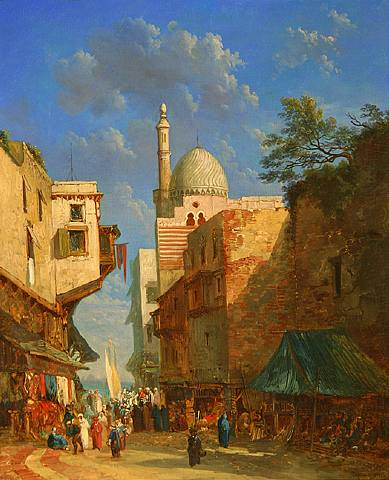
The Bazaar, 1856, oil on canvas laid on board.

Alexandre Defaux (1826–1900) was a French artist. Defaux was born in Bercy, on the outskirts of Paris and is an important figure of the second generation of Barbizon School painters in the lineage of Jean-Baptiste Corot - whose pupil he was - and Jean-François Millet. He painted almost exclusively in the Barbizon region or in Normandy and his early landscapes reflect Corot's influence with large urban panoramic views and figures in Neapolitan peasant costume. In the 1850s Defaux painted several views of Normandy towns and large medieval churches (see Figure 1).

Figure 1 presents a view of Rouen - most notably the silhouette of Rouen Cathedral - rising in the background under a hazy sky. In the foreground, a cluster of villagers occupies an earthen square, surrounded by rustic buildings. The scene is painted with a subdued, earthy palette and softened contours, characteristic of the Barbizon school. The juxtaposition of human activity and medieval architecture evokes a sense of enduring regional life within a historical urban landscape.

Later, he adopted stronger color combinations and more painterly techniques that suggest influences extending to other Barbizon artists such as Théodore Rousseau and Narcisse Díaz de la Peña. His Forest of Fontainebleau presented out of competition at the Salon of 1879 and his canvas of the Breton cliffs and the port of Pont-Aven in the 1880 edition were acquired by the French State. Defaux was named Chevalier of the Legion of Honor in 1881 and was awarded a gold medal at the 1900 World's Fair.

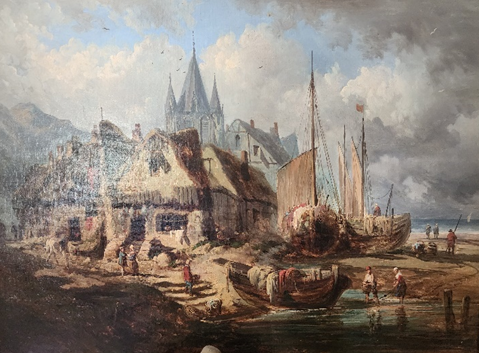
"Rouen" Oil on Canvas.

== List of paintings ==
- Brassée de fleurs dans une jardinière
- Les Cerisiers en fleurs en Normandie
- Country Landscape with Flowering Trees
- Feeding Time
- In the Shelter of the Stack
- Intérieur de Paris. Barricade de 1830
- Normandy Farm House
- Paysage en Normandie
- Poules pres d'un puits
- A Fishing Village
- Rouen

== Museum Collections ==
Museu de Arte de São Paulo-Brasil.

Petit Palais, Musée des Beaux-arts de la Ville de Paris.

Musée Carnavalet, Histoire de Paris.

Musée d'Orsay.
