= Bazzaro =

Bazzaro is an Italian surname. Notable people with the surname include:

- Ernesto Bazzaro (1859–1937), Italian sculptor, brother of Leonardo
- Leonardo Bazzaro (1853–1937), Italian painter
