= Mayabazar (soundtrack) =

- Album cover of the Telugu version

Soundtrack album by Ghantasala
- Released: 1957
- Genre: Feature film soundtrack
- Length: 41:10 (Telugu); 38:17 (Tamil); 36:48 (Kannada)
- Language: Telugu
- Label: His Master's Voice
- Producer: Ghantasala

Mayabazar: Music from the Motion Picture is the soundtrack album of the 1957 Indian bilingual film of the same name which was simultaneously shot in Telugu and Tamil. Ghantasala composed most of the album ( some of the songs were composed by Saluri Rajeswara Rao ) and the background score for the film. The soundtrack album features 12 tracks, whose lyrics were penned by Pingali Nagendrarao and Thanjai N. Ramaiah Dass for the Telugu and Tamil versions respectively.

== Development ==
After writing the music for four songs – "Srikarulu Devathalu", "Lahiri Lahiri", "Choopulu Kalisina Subhavela" and "Neekosame" – S. Rajeswara Rao left the project. (Note: M. L. Narasimham does not mention why S. Rajeswara Rao opted out of the project.) Following his departure, Ghantasala orchestrated and recorded Rajeswara Rao's compositions with N. C. Sen Gupta and A. Krishnamurthy, and composed the rest of the film's score.

The soundtrack album has 12 songs with lyrics by Pingali Nagendrarao and Thanjai N. Ramaiah Dass for the Telugu and Tamil versions, respectively, and was mixed by A. Krishnan and Siva Ram. The album was engineered by N. C. Sen Gupta and orchestrated by A. Krishnamurthy. Distributed by His Master's Voice, the album's cover depicts S. V. Ranga Rao as Ghatotkacha.

P. Leela said in an interview that one of her songs took 28 takes to record, and her fifth song was finished by Ghantasala. "Lahiri Lahiri" ("Aaga Inba Nilavinile" in Tamil) was based on the Mohanam raga.

"Vivaha Bhojanambu" ("Kalyana Samayal Saadham" in Tamil) was heavily based on lyrics from Surabhi Nataka Samajam's 1950s plays, which were influenced by 1940s Janaki Sapadham harikatha records by B. Nagarajakumari. Nagarajakumari was inspired by a song written by Gali Penchala Narasimha Rao for Sasirekha Parinayam (1936), directed by P. V. Das. That song's melody was inspired by Charles Penrose's 1922 song "The Laughing Policeman", written by Penrose under the pseudonym of Charles Jolly.

== Track listing ==
Telugu track list
No.	Title	Artist(s)	Length
1.	"Neekosame"	Ghantasala, P. Leela	03:25
2.	"Choopulu Kalisina Subhavela"	Ghantasala, P. Leela	03:13
3.	"Lahiri Lahiri"	Ghantasala, P. Leela	03:49
4.	"Srikarulu Devathalu"	M. L. Vasanthakumari	03:48
5.	"Neeve Naa"	Ghantasala, P. Leela	02:48
6.	"Aha Naa Pelliyanta"	P. Susheela, Ghantasala	02:33
7.	"Sundari"	Ghantasala, Savitri	02:17
8.	"Vivaha Bhojanambu"	Madhavapeddi Satyam	02:26
9.	"Vinnava Yashodamma"	P. Susheela, P. Leela	03:37
10.	"Dayacheyandi"	Ghantasala, K. Rani, Pithapuram Nageswara Rao, P. Susheela	07:21
11.	"Bhali Bhali"	Madhavapeddi Satyam	02:55
12.	"Lalli Lala"	Jikki, P. Susheela	04:10
13.	"Ashtadikkum"	Madhavapeddi Satyam	01:01
14.	"Jai Satya Sankalpa"	Ghantasala	00:51
15.	"Anandam Anandam Anandamayene"	Chorus	01:05
Total length:			41:10

Tamil track list
No.	Title	Artist(s)	Length
1.	"Unakkagave Naan Uyir Vaazhvene (Note: Telugu Neekosame - S. Rajeswara Rao composition)"	Ghantasala, P. Leela	03:25
2.	"Kannudan Kalandhidum Subadhiname (Note: Telugu Choopulu Kalisina Shubhavela - S. Rajeswara Rao composition)"	Ghantasala, P. Leela	03:13
3.	"Aaha Inba Nilavinile (Note: Telugu Lahiri Lahiri - S. Rajeswara Rao composition)"	Ghantasala, P. Leela	02:45
4.	"Chellamudan Devarkalum Nallaasi (Note: Telugu Srikarulu Devathalu - S. Rajeswara Rao composition)"	M. L. Vasanthakumari & Group	03:48
5.	"Neethana Ennai"	Ghantasala, P. Leela	02:45
6.	"Dum Dum Yen Kalyanam"	G. Kasthoori, Ghantasala	02:39
7.	"Thangame Un Pole"	S. C. Krishnan, Savitri	02:17
8.	"Kalyana Samayal Saadham"	Thiruchi Loganathan	02:26
9.	"Kelaayo Yashodamma"	P. Susheela, P. Leela	03:37
10.	"Dhayai Seiveerey"	S. C. Krishnan, Seerkazhi Govindarajan, P. Susheela, K. Rani	06:18
11.	"Bale Bale"	Seerkazhi Govindarajan	02:55
12.	"Lalli Lalla... Pambaramai Aadalaam"	Jikki, P. Susheela	03:21
13.	"Ashtadhikkilum Soozhum"	Thiruchi Loganathan	01:01
14.	"Jai Sathya Sangalpa"	Ghantasala	00:51
15.	"Aanandham Aanandham Aanandhame"	Chorus	01:05
Total length:			38:17

Kannada track list
No.	Title	Artist(s)	Length
1.	"Ninagosugave"	Ghantasala, P. Leela	03:27
2.	"Notavu Keletiha Shubhavela"	Ghantasala, P. Leela	03:09
3.	"Sagali Teli Taranggadholu"	Ghantasala, P. Leela	02:56
4.	"Srisuraru Thamadhalu"	M. L. Vasanthakumari	03:26
5.	"Neeno Nannanu"	Ghantasala, P. Leela	02:27
6.	"Aaha Nan Madhuve Yante"	Swarnalatha, M. Sathyam	02:35
7.	"Sundhari Naa Vincha"	Ghantasala, Swarnalatha	02:09
8.	"Vivaha Bhojanavidu"	Madhavapeddi Satyam	02:23
9.	"Ghottenu Yashodhamma"	P. Leela, Jikki, P. Susheela	03:03
10.	"Swagathavayya"	M. Sathyam, P. Susheela	06:24
11.	"Bhale Bhale Deva"	Madhavapeddi Satyam	02:58
12.	"Lalli Lalla... Ivaru Yaare"	Jikki, P. Susheela	04:10
13.	"Ashtadhikkum"	Madhavapeddi Satyam	01:01
14.	"Jai Sathya Sangalpa"	Ghantasala	00:51
15.	"Aanandham Aanandham Aanandhame"	Chorus	01:05
Total length:			36:48
