= Landa bazaar =

Type of flea market in Pakistan

Landa bazaar, also known as Lunda bazaar (Urdu: لنڈا بازار), is a type of flea market in a number of cities in Pakistan, where secondhand imported goods are sold.

== History ==
The origins of Landa Bazar are deeply intertwined with the development of the Lahore Junction railway station and the construction projects of the early British colonial era. Following the annexation of the Punjab, a prominent Kashmiri businessman and public works contractor, Mian Mohammad Sultan Chughtai (popularly known as Mian Sultan Thekedar), acquired extensive tracts of land outside the Delhi Gate. This land previously contained the ruins of the grand Mughal-era palaces and gardens belonging to Prince Dara Shikoh.

Upon being awarded the primary contract for constructing the fortress-like Lahore railway station building, Chughtai utilized the site as a key base of operations. He excavated the old Mughal foundations for brick masonry and established a massive travelers' inn known as Sarai Sultan (alternatively spelled Serai Sultan) to accommodate the massive influx of commuters, travelers, and the large force of Kashmiri laborers hired for the railway works. To support the daily needs and trade requirements of both the laborers and travelers at the Sarai, Chughtai constructed rows of uniform market shops adjacent to the complex. These bazaar blocks gradually expanded over the subsequent decades, evolving into the prominent secondhand goods hub known today as Landa Bazar. While much of the original inn has succumbed to modern urban encroachment, the surrounding locality continues to bear his legacy, formally designated as Union Council Sare Sultan.

== Sourcing ==
Pre-owned clothing, donated in countries such as Australia, Japan, South Korea, the United Kingdom, and the United States, is often distributed by charitable organizations. These organizations receive the items at no cost and sell them in bulk, priced per kilogram. Subsequently, the clothing is transported to Pakistan, where it is sorted and sent to markets.

== Re-exportation ==
The low-cost, second-hand clothing arriving in Pakistan attracts merchants from countries like Afghanistan, India, and Turkey who purchase these items at a slightly increased price. As a result, Pakistan imports these affordable garments, selects the highest quality products in optimal condition, and exports them in an unusual instance of double-arbitrage.

== List of locations ==
- Landa Bazaar, Lahore
- Landa Bazaar, Saddar, Karachi
- Lunda Bazaar, Sukkur
- Landa Bazaar, Swat
- Landa Bazaar, Rawalpindi
- Lighthouse Landa Bazaar, Karachi
- Landa bazaar, Gujranwala
