= Berachah the Hero =

Polish-Jewish soldier in the Polish-Muscovite War of 1610

Berachah the Hero was a Polish-Jewish soldier who was killed in the battle near Moscow in the Polish–Muscovite War in 1610.

== Biography ==
He was the son of Aaron ha-Kadosh ('The Martyr') of Tishovitz, Lublin Governorate, and served in the cavalry. In the responsa of Rabbi Meir Lublin and of Joel Särkes, details are given concerning his bravery and daring, which gained for him the admiration of the Cossacks, who surnamed him "The Hero." A reckless rider, he made many attempts to break the enemy's line, but was struck and killed by a bullet. The Cossacks much lamented his death, afterward burning his body; when on the following day the Poles, aided by the Cossacks, won the battle against the Muscovites, they recaptured his horse and helmet and quarreled among themselves for the possession of his effects.

These facts came to light through the testimony of Moses ben Joseph, who, in the name of eleven Jews who accompanied the army (probably as sutlers), testified in the case of Berachah's widow (agunah) before the rabbis.
