= Maharam's Synagogue =

Former synagogue in Lublin, Poland

- Location of the former synagogue in Lublin Voivodeship

Religion
- Affiliation: Orthodox Judaism (former)
- Rite: Nusach Ashkenaz
- Ecclesiastical or organizational status: Synagogue: (c. 16th century–c. 1655); (1866–1942))
- Status: Destroyed

Location
- Location: 3 Jateczna Street, Lublin, Lublin Voivodeship
- Country: Poland
- Interactive map of Maharam's Synagogue
- Coordinates: 51°15′11″N 22°34′12″E

Architecture
- Type: Synagogue architecture
- Style: Renaissance
- Completed: late 16th or early 17th centuries
- Destroyed: 1942
- Materials: Brick

The Maharam's Synagogue was a former Orthodox Jewish congregation and synagogue, that was part of synagogical complex in Podzamcze, located at 3 Jateczna Street, in Lublin, in the Lublin Voivodeship of Poland. Designed in the Renaissance style and completed in the late 16th or early 17th centuries, the synagogue served as a house of prayer, with several interruptions due to desecration and partial destruction, until World War II when it was destroyed by Nazis in 1942.

== History ==
Maharam's Synagogue was built near the end of the 16th or in the beginning of the 17th centuries, as a building clinging to the southern wall of Maharshal's Synagogue. The synagogue was named in honour of Lublin's rector and rabbi, Meir Lublin, who was also referred to as Maharam. The synagogue was purposed for officiating shabbat. The two synagogues could seat 3,000 worshippers combined.

It is likely that sessions of the Council of Four Lands took place within the synagogue. During Cossack-Muscovite invasion on Lublin in 1655, the aggressors burnt the building down although it was quickly rebuilt. During the subsequent years the building was neglected and not renovated and in 1854, after the night of Yom Kippur, the ceiling gave away. In 1866, a long renovation was finally completed. Of the old building, only the outline of the external wall is left.

During the interwar period due to bad technical condition, an extensive recondition was planned, however, World War II broke those plans. During the war, Nazi administration ordered to close the synagogue for worship purposes. Inside, existed a shelter for the poor, refugees, displaced persons. After the disposal of Lublin Ghetto, the synagogue with whole synagogical complex was blown up.

After the war, for a few years the ruins of the building weren't touched. In 1954, on order of the city's administration, they were dismantled because of building a new street, Aleja Tysiąclecia. There's a granite memorial, on which is written an expression in Polish, Yiddish and Hebrew languages.

In 2007, on initiative of Ośrodek Brama Gordzka-Teatr NN, a 3D model of Maharshal's and Maharam's Synagogues was created, after six months of work by Krzysztof Mucha.

== Architecture ==
The brick building was erected on the plan of elongated square in west–east direction in renaissance style. Entry was via a staircase located in the Maharshal's Synagogue.

There is no information on the plan of the building prior to the 1656 fire, besides the outlines on the city plans from: 1783, c. 1800, 1823 and 1829. The outline from 1823 is similar to the 1920 drawing. Until today, at least a dozen photographs, drawing and plans from the interwar period remained, thanks to which both internal and external views of the synagogue are known.

The building was fragmented on two long, narrow and preceded by a vestibule, rooms: a main room for prayers, clung to the prayers' room in Maharshal's Synagogue and a women's zone from the external side. Both of the rooms had a wooden ceiling.

The bimah, being short, octagonal, two-entry and surrounded by banister, was located in the middle of the main room for prayers. Located on the eastern wall was an ark, with Decalogue's memorials and covered by a parochet with the Star of David embroidered. Also on this wall was painted a polychrome as well as an unidentified picture.

== See also ==
- Chronology of Jewish Polish history
- History of the Jews in Poland
- List of active synagogues in Poland
