= Henio Zytomirski =

Polish Jew and Holocaust victim

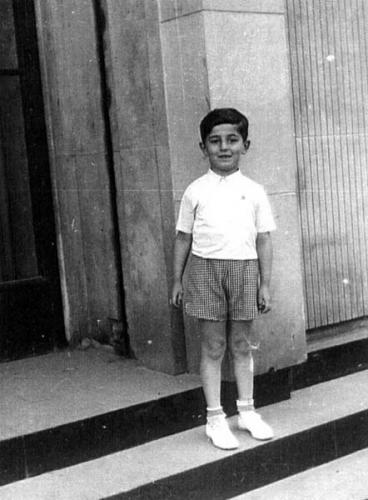
- Zytomirski on 5 July 1939
- Born: 25 March 1933; Lublin, Poland
- Died: 9 November 1942 (aged 9); Majdanek concentration camp, German-occupied Poland
- Cause of death: Murdered in gas chamber
- Known for: The addressee of the "Letters to Henio" project. One of the heroes of "The Primer" exhibition at the Majdanek Museum.

Henio Zytomirski (Hebrew: הניו ז׳יטומירסקי \ הֶנְיוֹ זִ׳יטוֹמִירְסְקִי, henyo zhitomirski, Polish: Henio Żytomirski; 25 March 1933 – 9 November 1942) was a Polish Jew, who was murdered at the age of 9 in a gas chamber at Majdanek concentration camp during the German Nazi occupation of Poland. Henio became an icon of the Holocaust, not only in Lublin but all over Poland. His life story became a part of the curriculum taught in the general education system in Poland. The "Letters to Henio" project has been held in Lublin since 2005. Henio Zytomirski is one of the heroes of "The Primer" permanent exhibition at barrack 53 of the Majdanek Museum, an exhibition dedicated to children held in the camp.

== Biography ==
Henio Zytomirski was born in Lublin in Poland, the firstborn son of Sara (née Oksman) and Shmuel Zytomirski. Henio and his parents lived at 3rd Szewska Street in Lublin. His grandparents, Chaya (née Melamed) and Ephraim Zytomirski, lived at 22nd Lubartowska Street. On 1 September 1937 Henio began attending "Trachter" kindergarten in Lublin. On 5 July 1939 he was photographed for the last time at the entrance to PKO Bank, located at 64 Krakowska Avenue (Polish: Krakowskie Przedmieście) in Lublin. On 1 September 1939 Henio was supposed to start first grade, but that day, Nazi Germany invaded Poland.

With the establishment of the German Nazi reign in Poland, a Judenrat of 24 members was set up in Lublin. Shmuel, Henio's father, a teacher by profession and Chairman of the Poale Zion movement in Lublin, was appointed by the Judenrat to be the manager of the post office at 2nd Kowalska Street. This role allowed him, apparently, to make contact with the Polish underground (which delivered him forbidden information and news); to correspond with his young brother, Yehuda (Leon) Zytomirski, who had already emigrated to Palestine in 1937; to be in contact with Yitzhak Zuckerman and Zivia Lubetkin from the Jewish resistance in the Warsaw Ghetto and with Hashomer Hatzair people in Vilnius; and to correspond with Nathan Schwalb, Director of the Jewish Agency offices and Hehalutz movement in Geneva, who aided hundreds of youth movement activists in the Nazi-occupied territories.

By order of the Nazi German governor of Distrikt Lublin, all 34,149 Jews who then lived in the city were forced to move to the ghetto that was established in Lublin on 24 March 1941. In March 1941, the Zytomirski family moved to 11th Kowalska Street in the Lublin Ghetto. Henio's grandfather, Ephraim Zytomirski, died of typhus on 10 November 1941. Before his death he asked to be buried near the cemetery gate in order to be the first to witness the liberation of Lublin. The tombstone on his grave was smashed and destroyed in 1943 when the Nazis liquidated the new Jewish cemetery in Lublin.

On 16 March 1942, the transports in freight trains from Lublin District to extermination camps began as part of "Operation Reinhard". Every day about 1,400 people were sent to the camps. The German police and SS people supervised the transports. Selection of Jews took place in the square near the municipal slaughterhouse. The deportees were led on foot from the Great Synagogue (named after the Maharshal), which served as a gathering place for the deportees. Aged and sick people were shot on the spot. The rest were sent to the extermination camps, mainly to Belzec. Hundreds of Jews were shot dead in the woods on the outskirts of Lublin. A total of about 29,000 Lublin Jews were exterminated during March and April 1942. Among them were Henio's mother and grandmother, as well as two of his aunts – Esther and Rachel – who were murdered in Belzec's gas chambers shortly after arrival.

On 14 April 1942 the transports ended. Henio and his father survived the selections of spring 1942, apparently thanks to a work permit (J-Ausweis) that his father had. Along with the rest of the Jews who stayed alive in Lublin, they were transferred to another smaller ghetto that was built in Majdan Tatarski (a suburb of Lublin). Between 7,000 and 8,000 people entered this ghetto, although many of them did not have work permits. On 22 April the SS held another selection: about 2,500 to 3,000 people without work permits were taken first to Majdanek and from there to the Krepiec forest which is about 15 km from Lublin. There they were shot to death.

On 9 November 1942, the final liquidation of the Jewish Ghetto in Majdan Tatarski occurred. About 3,000 people were sent to the extermination camp Majdanek, including Henio and his father Shmuel. Old people and children were sent immediately to the gas chamber. Nine-year-old Henio was also in this group.

Henio's father, Shmuel Zytomirski, was transferred to a forced labor camp outside Majdanek, where the prisoners built a sports stadium for the SS. From the camp he managed to send a few last letters to his brother Yehuda in Palestine and to the Zionist delegation in Istanbul. On 3 November 1943 the massive extermination of all remaining Jewish prisoners in Majdanek and the other camps in Lublin District took place. This liquidation is known as "Aktion Erntefest", which in German means "Harvest Festival". On that day 18,400 Jews were murdered in Majdanek. At the end of this killing operation, Lublin District was declared Judenrein, i.e., "clean of Jews". Shmuel Zytomirski survived this mass extermination. This is known because he sent a letter from Lublin by courier to the Jewish delegation in Istanbul on 6 January 1944. It is not clear where this letter was sent from. The city of Lublin was liberated by the Soviet Red Army on 22 July 1944. It is known for certain that Shmuel Zytomirski did not survive the Holocaust, but his cause, date, and place of death are unknown.

== Letters to Henio ==
The "Letters to Henio" project began in the city of Lublin in 2005 as part of an activity to preserve and reconstruct the city's Jewish heritage. A local cultural center, Grodzka Gate – NN Theatre, organizes this educational activity. According to the center's director, Tomasz Pietrasiewicz, the main idea of the project is as follows: "It is unacceptable to remember the faces and names of 40,000 people. Remember one. A shy smile, white shirt with a collar, colored shorts, side haircut, striped socks… Henio."

Every year on 19 April, which is Holocaust Remembrance Day in Poland, pupils and citizens of Lublin are asked to send letters addressed to Henio Zytomirski at 11th Kowalska Street, the last known address of Henio in Lublin. Thousands of letters were sent to Henio, including paintings, personal letters and exciting stories of 12- to 13-year-old children. At the entrance to the PKO Bank, the place where Henio's last picture was taken, a special mailbox is placed every year for sending the letters to Henio. Lublin postal authorities have to deal with full sacks of letters which are sent back to senders with the post seal: "Unknown Addressee". Later in the day, participants follow a walking tour by foot and visit the addresses where Henio had lived at: 3 Szewska Street and 11 Kowalska Street (in the Ghetto). The walk ends with a silent prayer at the foot of a street lamp, which is the last remnant of the pre-war Jewish town of Lublin serving as a memorial candle. In 2007 the passengers by the bank were asked to write letters to Henio on the spot. The response was extraordinary. The national Polish press dedicates a lot of reportages to this project. Since 2005 Henio Zytomirski has become an icon of the Holocaust, not only in Lublin but all over Poland. Today his life story is a part of the curriculum which is learnt in the general education system in Poland. School newspapers tell about him and try to understand the meaning of the Holocaust through his short life story.

== The Primer ==
"The Primer" (Polish: Elementarz) permanent exhibition in Majdanek is exhibited in barrack 53, and it is dedicated to the children who were in the camp. This exhibition was created by Tomasz Pietrasiewicz, the director of The Grodzka Gate – Theater NN Center. The purpose of this educational project is to demonstrate the fate of the children who were imprisoned in the death camp. The idea of the project was born when one of the survivors noticed that Majdanek Museum does not inform the visitors and does not show them the lives of the children in the camp. It was hard for pupils who visited Majdanek museum to identify themselves emotionally with the things which happened in Majdanek. Through this exhibition the Majdanek museum enables pupils to turn the knowledge which is learnt in school into real education that concerns what had happened in "The Camp World".

The exhibition shows the fate of four children, ex-prisoners in Majdanek Camp: two Jewish children, Halina Birenbaum and Henio Zytomirski; a Belarusian child, Piotr Kiryszczenko; and a Polish girl, Janina Buczek. One of them was killed in the camp – Henio Zytomirski. The exhibition presents in a symbolic way also a fifth fate which was likely the fate of Jewish girls in the camp. We learn this only from what was written on a slip of paper which was found in Majdanek, hidden in a girl's shoe:

"There was once Elżunia,
who was dying all alone,
In Majdanek was her father,
And in Auschwitz was her mum".

The girl, Elżunia, who wrote the note was nine years old, and she was singing the song to herself to a melody of a famous Polish nursery rhyme (in Polish: "Z popielnika na Wojtusia iskiereczka mruga"). In the exhibition the visitors can hear both versions of the song.

The exhibition is divided into two parts: "The Primer World" and "The Camp World".

It is "The Primer" that teaches children how to organize and describe the world. It contains the simplest social categories that form the basis for relations between a human being and the world that surrounds him. A unique characteristic of "The Primer" lies in presenting a world without cruelty and evil. The children were "dragged out" from this simple and naive world of "The Primer" and forcibly thrown into the "Camp World". This world requires a completely different "Primer" – the Death camp Primer.

The "Camp World" that children were brought into was completely different from the world pictured in "The Primer". Camp life brought entirely new experiences, created new concepts for children such as: hunger, selection, gas chamber – as well as daily contact with evil and death. Living in the camp caused distortion, deformed and destroyed the children's psyches. Along the walls of "The Primer World" there are pre-war primers in Polish, Belarusian and Hebrew. Four children's names are written in white chalk on the school board, those whose fates are presented in the exhibition. A hum of a school corridor is sounded in the room, and one can hear screams and pushing shouts of children during a school break.

In "The Camp World" there is a symbolic "Camp Primer". The following words are described in it: appeal, barrack, gas chamber, crematorium, camp, selection, transport. Each word is expressed by the memories of survivors. To emphasize the importance of the strength of these terms, the terms were written and burned out on clay boards. The boards are put on concrete plates. All texts (written and spoken) presented in this part of the exhibition are memories of the prisoners. There are no comments, historic studies, etc. There are only testimonies of the witnesses.

Four concrete water wells erected in the barrack symbolize the fate of each of the four children. The wells go through the floor down to the earth under the barrack. When one leans into the well, one can hear from the depths of the earth a story narrated by an adult about their stay in camp when they were children. The well commemorating Henio Zytomirski is silent– he did not survive the camp.

== See also ==
- Anne Frank
