= Shmuel Zytomirski =

Polish teacher

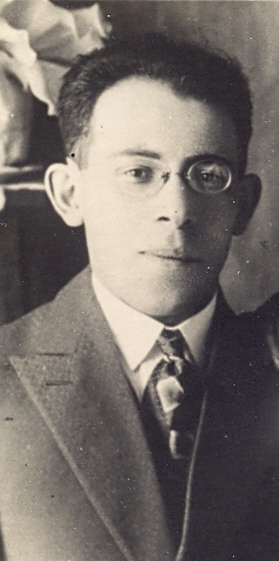
- Zytomirski, c. 1916-17
- Born: 16 September 1900; Warsaw, Congress Poland
- Died: 1944 (aged 43–44)
- Education: Teacher
- Known for: Henio Zytomirski's father and a well-known figure at the Jewish community of Lublin before and during World War II.
- Children: Henio Zytomirski

Shmuel Zytomirski (Hebrew: שמואל ז'יטומירסקי, Polish: Szmuel Żytomirski; 16 September 1900 – 1944) was a well-known figure of the Jewish community of Lublin before and during World War II and the father of Henio Zytomirski. He was murdered in the Holocaust at the end of the war, after almost all his family were killed by the Nazis. The letters Zytomirski had sent and received during the war document a lost struggle of a brave man who died shortly before the war ended. The information regarding the short life of his son Henio, who became an icon of the Holocaust in Poland, became known to the public from his father's letters. The circumstances of Shmuel Zytomirski's death remain mysterious and are unknown to this day.

== Biography ==
=== Youth ===
Shmuel Zytomirski was born in Warsaw (now in Poland, but then in Imperial Russia) on 16 September 1900. His father, Ephraim (1873–1941), who was born in the little town of Medzhybizh (Polish: Międzybóż) in Podolia (now in Ukraine) was a member of Hovevei Zion, a follower of the Mizrachi movement, one of the Yavne School founders in Lublin and an active member in a "benefit society" charity fund in Lublin. Shmuel's mother, Chaya Devora (née Melamed) (1882–1942), was born in Riga (now the capital of Latvia, but then in Imperial Russia). At the age of 16, Shmuel graduated cum laude from Krinsky Jewish Gymnasium in Warsaw. During World War I, the economic conditions in Warsaw became worse. In 1917, the Zytomirski family moved to Lublin, hoping to improve their economic status.

=== Teacher and educator ===
Young Shmuel Zytomirski was a teacher in the Tarbut school in the town of Bychawa. His attempts to emigrate from Poland to Mandatory Palestine had failed. After completing a year of study at the University of Vienna, he came back to Lublin in 1922 and continued to teach. He was an idealistic devoted teacher. Zytomirski had taught his students the best works of art of the modern Hebrew poets and writers (Constitution Generation): Bialik, Tchernichovsky, Peretz and Frug. In his students' hearts he implanted the Zionist vision and the desire for leaving diaspora and aiding the national renewal of the Jews in the Land of Israel. While teaching he used various advanced pedagogical methods: plays, poetry, public declamation of pieces, and trips out-of-town.

=== Zionist leader ===
Zytomirski's best efforts were dedicated to Zionist activity, which had national and social orientation. He was the chairman of Poale Zion (Z.S.) party in Lublin. Zytomirski and his party took actions in the community council and in the community committee for the poor and for Zionist enterprises and institutions. Thanks to the efforts of the Poale Zion (Z.S.) party, the community council allocated substantial funds for several important organizations - CYSZO (The Central Organization of Yiddish Schools), the Tarbut Hebrew school, the National Funds (JNF and Keren Hayesod), HeHalutz movement and Hapoel sport association (the first Hapoel club in Poland was founded in Lublin) - as well as for evening classes organized by the Poale Zion (Z.S.) party. Thanks to the efforts of the Zionist parties, several rooms at the community house on 41 Krawiecka street were renovated and given to the Hakhshara Kibbutzim. These kibbutzim were the cores of Yad Mordechai and Negba kibbutzim in the land of Israel.

Often Zytomirski and his party members participated in lectures and meetings which were held in towns near Lublin: Piaski (Lublin Province), Lubartow, Łęczna, Krasnik, Bychawa and Bilgoraj. Frequently there were district conferences of the Poale Zion (Z.S.) party, in which representatives from the central committee in Warsaw were present.

Zytomirski was a member of the Central Committee of the League for Working Eretz Israel. The league carried out an extensive explanatory and cultural activities agenda. Famous people came to Lublin and lectured in the league's meetings: Zalman Shazar (Rubashov), the author Nathan Bistritzky (Agmon) and Eliyahu Dobkin.

Zytomirski was a committee member of the HeHalutz organization in Lublin. He was also a member of the youth movement 'Dror' and its culture committee, and attended the Executive Committee of the Tarbut Hebrew school in Lublin. In the 1930s Zytomirski was the organizer of the Lublin branch of the HIAS welfare organization.

=== Zytomirski and his son Henio ===
In the early 1930s Shmuel Zytomirski was married to Sara Oksman, who ran a retail store selling stationery. In 1933 their son Henio (in Hebrew: חיים) was born.

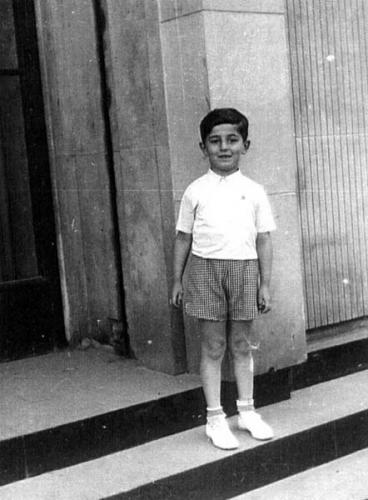
Henio Zytomirski, 5 July 1939

During Henio's childhood, the situation of Jews in Poland became worse. In the neighbouring country of Germany, the Nazi regime was established, and in post-Pilsudski Poland, anti-Semitism increased. Over the window of the Zytomirski family store, Anti-Semitic Poles had engraved the word ZYD (in Polish: "Żyd"). In 1937, Shmuel Zytomirski wrote in a letter to his young brother Yehuda, who had immigrated to Mandatory Palestine in that year:

and I am very bothered by the question: What will be with my son when he grows up? I can already give him a report that there is no future for him in Poland, and I am already prepared to send him to Palestine in order to teach him there. Because indeed, all of my share from all my labor is my son, and I cannot imagine his future - even the near future - outside the borders of Palestine.

In accordance with his perception, he registered his son to learn in Tarbut school, a Jewish and Zionist school in which the lessons were in the Hebrew language. Henio was not fortunate enough to enter the school gates. On 1 September 1939, the opening day of school, Nazi Germany invaded Poland and World War II began.

== World War II period ==
=== Lublin Ghetto ===
With the establishment of the Nazi regime in Poland, a Judenrat of twenty-four members was set up in Lublin. Zytomirski, a teacher by profession and Chairman of the Poale Zion movement in Lublin, was appointed by the Judenrat to be the manager of the post office at 2nd Kowalska Street. This role allowed him, apparently, to make contact with the Polish underground (which delivered him forbidden information and news); to correspond with his young brother, Yehuda (Leon) Zytomirski, who had already immigrated to Mandatory Palestine in 1937; to be in contact with Yitzhak Zuckerman and Zivia Lubetkin from the Jewish resistance in the Warsaw Ghetto and with Hashomer Hatzair members in Vilnius; and to correspond with Nathan Schwalb, Director of the Jewish Agency offices and the HeHalutz movement in Geneva, who was providing assistance to hundreds of youth movement activists in the Nazi-occupied territories.

By order of the Nazi governor of Lublin district, all 34,149 Jews who lived then in the city were forced on 24 March 1941 to move to the ghetto that was established in Lublin. In March 1941, the Zytomirski family moved to 11th Kowalska Street in the Lublin Ghetto. Shmuel Zytomirski's father, Ephraim, died from typhus on 10 November 1941. Before his death he asked to be buried near the cemetery gates in order to be the first to witness the liberation of Lublin. The tombstone on his grave was smashed and destroyed in 1943 when the Nazis liquidated the new Jewish graveyard in Lublin.

Zytomirski did not surrender to the harsh conditions in Lublin Ghetto and was a source of encouragement to his friends. For example, in December 1941 the Nazi Security Police (in Germany: Sicherheitspolizei SiPo) ordered the Judenrat in Lublin to collect from Lublin Jews all the woolen clothes they had in their possession and give it to the Germans. The Judenrat called to one hundred people and sent them to collect woolen clothes. Professor Nachman Korn and Shmuel Zytomirski went from house to house to collect woolen clothes for the Wehrmacht soldiers who fought in the Russian front. Zytomirski had tried to reassure the people and told them:

Jews, give wool, because the salvation is about to come. If collecting clothes for the Germans on the front is needed, it means they are in big trouble...

Being a person who had seen matters from a historical perspective, Zytomirski wrote a diary since the beginning of the Nazi occupation. In his diary he recorded everything he had seen and heard. He kept the diary like the apple of his eye. His hope was that the diary would get to trustful hands and would serve as evidence of Nazi atrocities. With the death of Shmuel Zytomirski also his diary was lost. His letters and those of his father which remained after their death are poor substitutes for the lost diary. Reading the letters leads the reader through the loss of the family and loss of the Lublin Jewish community.

=== Sending Lublin Jews to extermination in Belzec ===
On 16 March 1942, the transports in freight trains from Lublin District to extermination camps began as part of "Operation Reinhard". Every day about 1,400 people were sent to the camps. The German police and SS people supervised the transports. The Selection of the Jews took place in the square adjacent to the municipal slaughterhouse. The deportees were led on foot from the Great Synagogue (named after the Maharshal), which served as a gathering place for the deportees. Elderly and sick people were shot on the spot. The rest were sent to the extermination camps, mainly to Belzec. Hundreds of Jews were shot dead in the woods on the outskirts of Lublin. A total of about 29,000 Lublin Jews were exterminated during March and April 1942. Apparently, among them were Shmuel Zytomirski's wife, mother and two of his sisters – Esther and Rachel – who were murdered then.

=== Majdan Tatarski Ghetto ===
On 14 April 1942 the transports ended. Zytomirski and his son Henio survived the selections of spring 1942, apparently thanks to a work permit (in German: J-Ausweis) that Shmuel had. Along with the rest of the Jews who stayed alive in Lublin, they were transferred to another smaller ghetto that was established in Majdan Tatarski (a suburb of Lublin). Between 7,000 and 8,000 people entered this ghetto, although many of them did not have work permits. On 22 April, the SS held another selection: about 2,500 to 3,000 people without work permits were taken initially to Majdanek and from there to Krepiec (Krępiec) forest which is about 15 km from Lublin. There they were shot to death.

From the Majdan Tatarski ghetto Zytomirski sent (via the Red Cross organization) a message to his brother Yehuda in Mandatory Palestine:

- - - Henio is with me.

On 23 July 1942 Zytomirski sent a letter from the Majdan Tatarski ghetto to Nathan Schwalb in Geneva:

You must know how sad and lonely I am. If my dear wife and my devoted parents were alive, things were totally different. At this moment you are my only hope. That is why I expect to receive food packages from you as frequent as possible. In my solitude I hang all my hopes in you.

These words of Zytomirski, "in my solitude I hang all my hopes in you", were used by the Holocaust researcher, Prof. Avraham Milgram, as the title of his article about sending the food packages from Portugal to Jews who were in territories under Nazi occupation.

=== End of Lublin Jews ===
On 9 November 1942, the final liquidation of the Jewish Ghetto in Majdan Tatarski occurred. About 3,000 people were sent to the extermination camp Majdanek, including Zytomirski and his son Henio. Old people and children were sent immediately to the gas chamber. Nine year old Henio Zytomirski was also in this group.

Men and women who were capable to work were sent to forced labor camps in Lublin, such as Flugplatz camp (where the property of the murdered Jews was sorted and sent to Germany) and Sportplatz (where the forced labor prisoners built a sports stadium for the SS people). Apparently, Zytomirski was transferred to the Sportplatz camp. From the camp he managed to send two last letters to the Zionist delegation in Constantinople. On 3 November 1943, the massive extermination of all remaining Jewish captives and prisoners in Majdanek and the other camps in Lublin District took place. This liquidation is known as "Aktion Erntefest", which in German means "Harvest Festival". On that day at Majadanek 18,400 Jews were shot to death in specially dug open pits. That murderous "operation" was the largest single execution in the history of the Nazi death camps. At the end of this killing operation, Lublin District was declared Judenrein, i.e., "free of Jews".

== Mystery of his death ==
Surprisingly, Shmuel Zytomirski survived also this mass extermination. This is known according to a letter he had sent by courier from Lublin to the Zionist delegation in Constantinople on 6 January 1944. It is not clear from where exactly this letter was sent. The address on the letter was "7 Drobna Street". In that letter Zytomirski stated preliminary information about the mass killing at Majdanek in November 1943. That was his last letter. Only half a year later, on 24 July 1944, the city of Lublin was liberated by the Soviet Red Army. Shmuel Zytomirski did not survive the Holocaust; the circumstances of his death remain unknown. It is not known where he was hiding in the last days of his life, and whether he was betrayed or got sick and died.

== See also ==
- The Holocaust
- Lublin Ghetto
- Henio Zytomirski
