= Jaworze, Silesian Voivodeship =

Jaworze
- Village
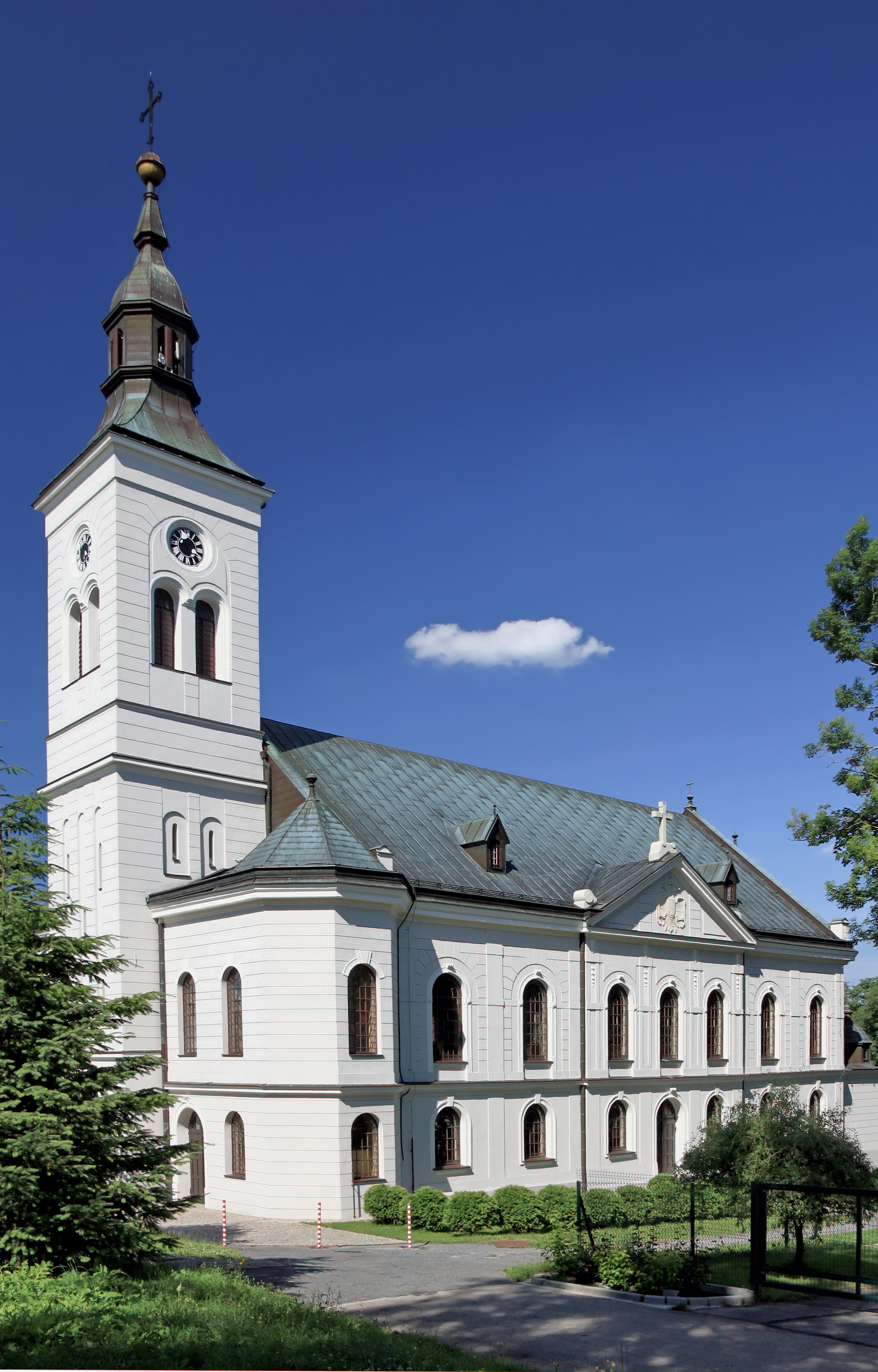
- Lutheran church in Jaworze

- Coat of arms

- Location within Poland
- Coordinates: 49°48′22″N 18°56′32″E
- Country: Poland
- Voivodeship: Silesian
- County: Bielsko
- Gmina: Jaworze
- First mentioned: 1305

Area
  - Total: 21.23 km^{2} (8.20 sq mi)

Population
  - Total: 6,195
  - Density: 291.8/km^{2} (755.8/sq mi)
- Time zone: UTC+1 (CET)
  - Summer (DST): UTC+2 (CEST)
- Postal code: 43-384
- Car plates: SBI
- Website: www.jaworze.pl

Jaworze [jaˈvɔʐɛ] is a village and the seat of Gmina Jaworze in the south-west part Bielsko County, Silesian Voivodeship, southern Poland. It lies in the historical region of Cieszyn Silesia.

The village has been known for its thermal qualities. As early as in 19th century waters rich in iodide-bromine salts. Every year many people suffering from respiratory illnesses visit. Presently there are three medical centers, which offer among other things specialist rehabilitation programs for individuals. There are also holiday-recreation facilities, bike and ski tracks in Jaworze. The tourist attractiveness of the commune is increased by numerous sport and cultural events presenting local folklore. The undeniable crown jewel of Jaworze is its heritage park, over 15 hectares (37 acres) in size and with large number of monument trees.

== Etymology ==
The Polish name is of topographic origins and is derived from sycamore trees (Polish: jawor. German name is a composition of a personal name Ern(st) and dorf (German: a village).

== History ==
The village was first mentioned in a Latin document of Diocese of Wrocław called Liber fundationis episcopatus Vratislaviensis from around 1305 as item in Javorse. It meant that the village was in the process of location (the size of land to pay tithe from was not yet precised). The creation of the village was a part of a larger settlement campaign taking place in the late 13th century on the territory of what will be later known as Upper Silesia.

Politically the village belonged initially to the Duchy of Teschen, formed in 1290 in the process of feudal fragmentation of Poland and was ruled by a local branch of Piast dynasty. In 1327 the duchy became a fee of Kingdom of Bohemia, which after 1526 became part of the Habsburg monarchy.

The village probably became a seat of a Catholic parish prior to the 16th century. After the 1540s Protestant Reformation prevailed in the Duchy of Teschen and a local Catholic church was taken over by Lutherans. It was taken from them (as one from around fifty buildings in the region) by a special commission and given back to the Roman Catholic Church on 16 April 1654. In spite of being bereft of place of worship many of the local inhabitants remained to be Lutherans. After issuing the Patent of Toleration in 1781 they subsequently organized a local Lutheran parish as one of over ten in the region.

As a private village it had many noble owners. The most important for its development were two related aristocratic families of the Barons Laszowski, Nałęcz coat of arms (two generations), and the Counts Saint-Genois d’Anneaucourt (four generations), who were in possession of Jaworze for the period of 154 years. Many antique souvenirs of theirs have remained to the present day. Their remains rest in the local Catholic graveyard. In 1862, Maurycy Count Saint-Genois founded in Jaworze the first in the Cieszyn Silesia health resort. It has been very popular for many years, especially among Poles from Galicia for whom the freedom of speaking Polish language in the area was invaluable. However, it was due to the support and help of the Larisch family that Dr Zygmunt Czop founded hydropathic establishment after the World War I. Rooms in the castle which has been visited by many celebrities of political and cultural circles of the interwar Poland were made available to the Starost of Bielsko by the Count himself. It was an important fact in the history of Jaworze. Many well-known figures were visitors to the hydropathic establishment in Jaworze. Advanced works related to restoring the status of a health resort to Jaworze were wrecked by the outbreak of the World War II.

After Revolutions of 1848 in the Austrian Empire a modern municipal division was introduced in the re-established Austrian Silesia. The village as a municipality was subscribed to the political and legal district of Bielsko. According to the censuses conducted in 1880, 1890, 1900 and 1910 the population of the municipality grew from 2105 in 1880 to 2247 in 1910 with a dwindling majority being native Polish-speakers (from 94.6% in 1880 to 89.2% in 1910) accompanied by a growing German-speaking minority (from 108 or 5.2% in 1880 to 232 or 10.3% in 1910) and a few Czech-speaking persons (at most 14 or 0.6% in 1900), in terms of religion in 1910 the population was mixed mostly between Roman Catholics (49.8%) and Protestants (48.7%) accompanied by Jews (34 or 1.5%). The village was also traditionally inhabited by Cieszyn Vlachs, speaking Cieszyn Silesian dialect.

After World War I, fall of Austria-Hungary, Polish–Czechoslovak War and the division of Cieszyn Silesia in 1920, it became a part of Poland. It was then annexed by Nazi Germany at the beginning of World War II. After the war it was restored to Poland.

In the period when Jaworze functioned as a health resort, it became renowned due to the writings of Wincenty Pol who wrote words of praise about Jaworze in Kraków's newspapers. In the interwar period it was the writer Maria Dąbrowska who gave Jaworze wide publicity. She was a visitor to the hydropathic establishment in Jaworze where she wrote, among other things, part of her work „Noce i dnie” and some other less known pieces. Also Melchior Wańkowicz was writing here his piece „Dysk Olimpijski”. Destroyed during a few months of fights, after the war Jaworze has struggled for a long time to rebuild its existence and striven in vain to continue works connected with restoring the village the status of a health resort. Nevertheless, it remained a health and tourist resort with two sanatoriums and a growing number of recreation centres over the years. At the same time, entertainment and recreation facilities were being built. Depriving Jaworze of administrative independence in 1973 was the reason for stopping a planned development of the village in this direction. Because of the firm attitude of inhabitants, Jaworze became an independent commune again in 1991 after eighteen years break and is now following its development plan.

== Geography ==
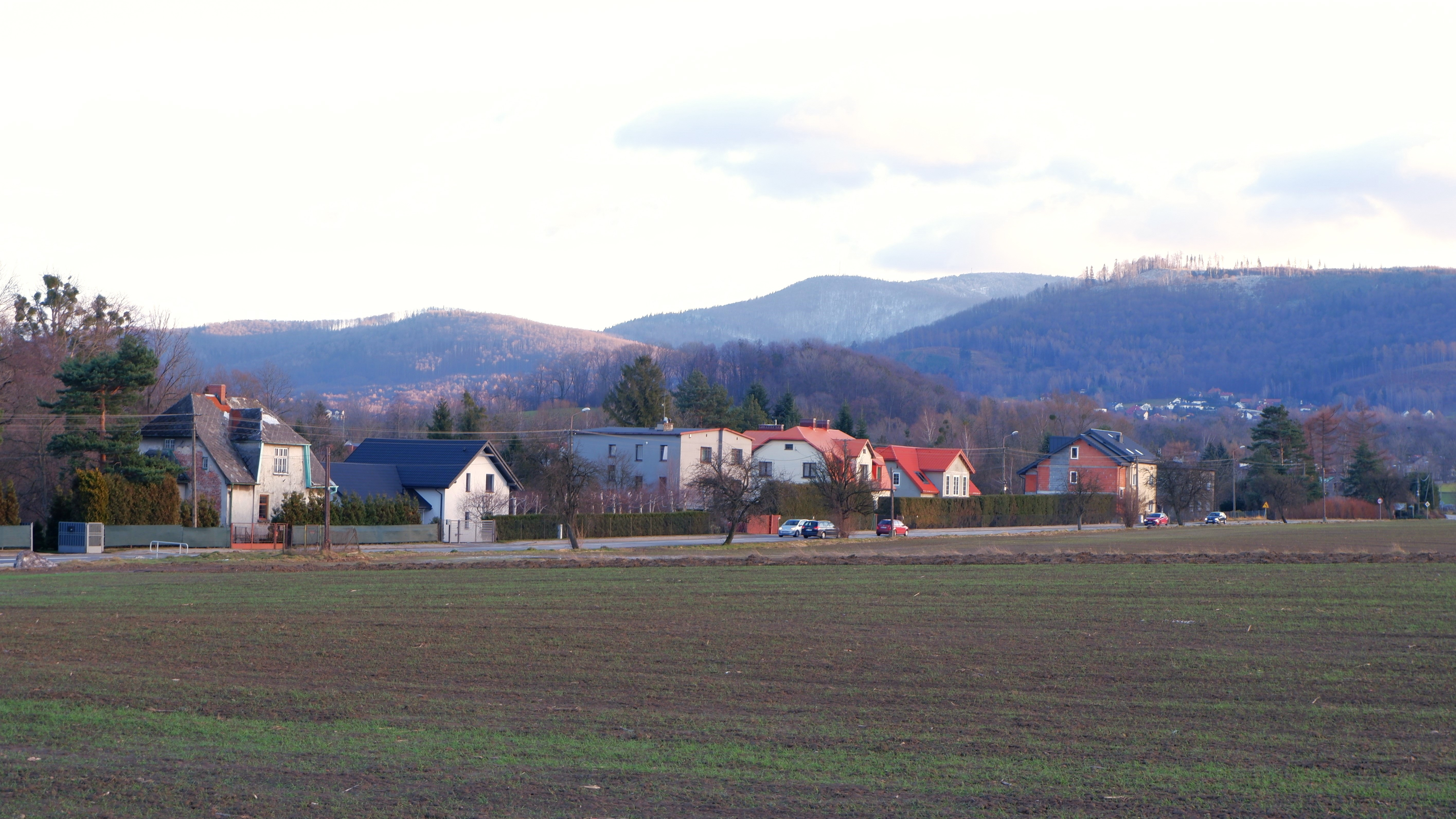
View of the Silesian Beskids from Jaworze Dolne

Jaworze lies in Silesian Foothills and on northern edge of Silesian Beskids. Four valleys crossing the village – of Kammienny, Wysoki, Szeroki and Jesionki streams abundant with flora enriched with protected species and frequently visited walking areas. The south border of the commune are the peaks of mountains visited in large numbers by tourists. The main street of Jaworze called Zdrojowa Street, almost 4 km long, runs from the north border of the commune at the state Cieszyn road to its south borders. One of the four hills of Jaworze visible from Zdrojowa Street is the historical Młyńska Kępa (403m) situated at the former Emperor's track, also called the saline road (with an inn for mail horses) along which the army of Jan III Sobieski redeployed to Vienna rescue.

The landmark of Jaworze center lying under Goruszka Hill (411m) is the monument for victims of fascism erected in 1946 by the efforts of the Association of Former Political Prisoners (59 victims). From there you can climb up the Goruszka constituting the only compact site of black pines in the Silesian Beskids. In 2004 these rare trees were counted and there are only 500 of them, what is worth mentioning they are not self-sown plants in out conditions. In the 19th century this hill was called “Allainzberg” (Mountain of the Allies) which was connected with the history of Napoleonic period and the fact the hitherto owners of Jaworze were Saint-Genois counts. On the top of the Goruszka there is a 200-year-gloriette which was renovated in 2003. During the conservation works under the roof of one of the columns the year 1798 engraved was discovered.

== Tourism ==
The favourite route in Silesian Beskids is the climb or ride by cable car on the Szyndzielnia mountain and then marching or walking you may get to Klimczok and Błatnia and from there walk down to Jaworze or Nałęże or even further at the direction of Brenna or other mountain peaks.

Tourism and agricultural tourism are essentially crucial to the development of the Jaworze Commune. Wooded areas of the Commune, mountain slopes and other natural values like mineral water resources are the most important factors which favour tourism development in Jaworze. In addition, the Jaworze Commune has good transport links, there are monuments of nature and interesting cultural places including monuments registered both in record of monuments and register of monuments. Hiking trails (e.g. Greenways) in the Commune and the direct proximity and cooperation with the regions of the Czech Republic, Slovakia, and Hungary are also of significance.

The village offers agro-tourist households with a wide range of services, i.e. accommodation, regional cuisine, trips by horse light carriages, sleigh rides, expositions of old household appliances (heritage park), old constructions and inns, galleries of folklore artists.

A highly important factor in the social and economic development of the Commune are brine springs that are present here. In accordance with the thesis presented in geological documentation prepared by the Polish Geological Institute in Warsaw, it was officially confirmed that deposits of mineral groundwater of Miocene and Devonian formations, which are present here, are of great value for curative purposes.

== Notable residents ==
- Ireneusz Dudek (b.1951), blues musician, Head of the Rawa Blues Festival
- Jacek Proszyk (b.1973), historian and religious scholar
