= Jacek Proszyk =

Polish historian and religions scholar (born 1973)

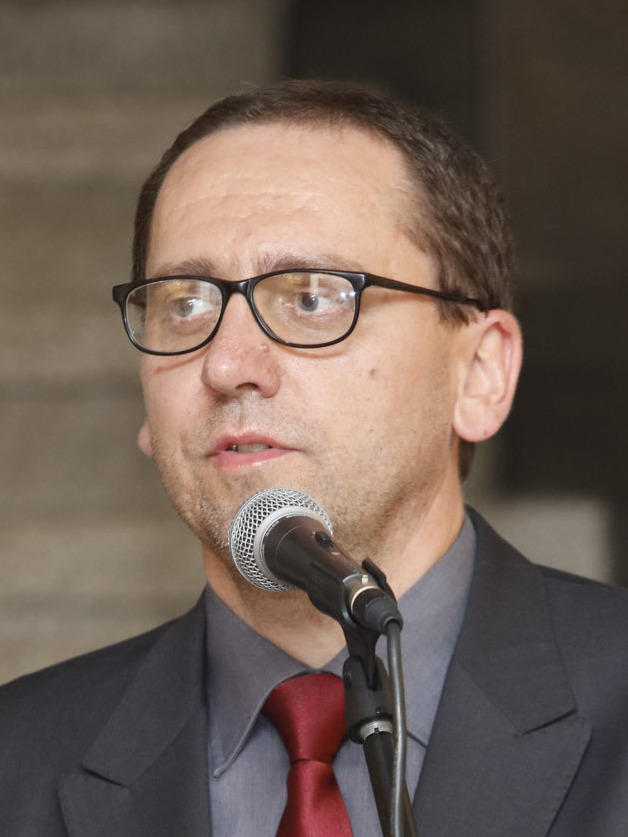
- Proszyk in June 2016
- Born: May 7, 1973; Szamotuły
- Citizenship: Poland
- Education: University of Warsaw; Jagiellonian University
- Awards: Maria and Łukasz Hirszowicz Awards – Jewish Historical Institute Warsaw 2016
- Scientific career
- Fields: European History
- Workplaces: Bielsko-Biała Museum and Castle
- Doctoral advisor: Krzysztof Pilarczyk
- Website: proszyk.blogspot.com

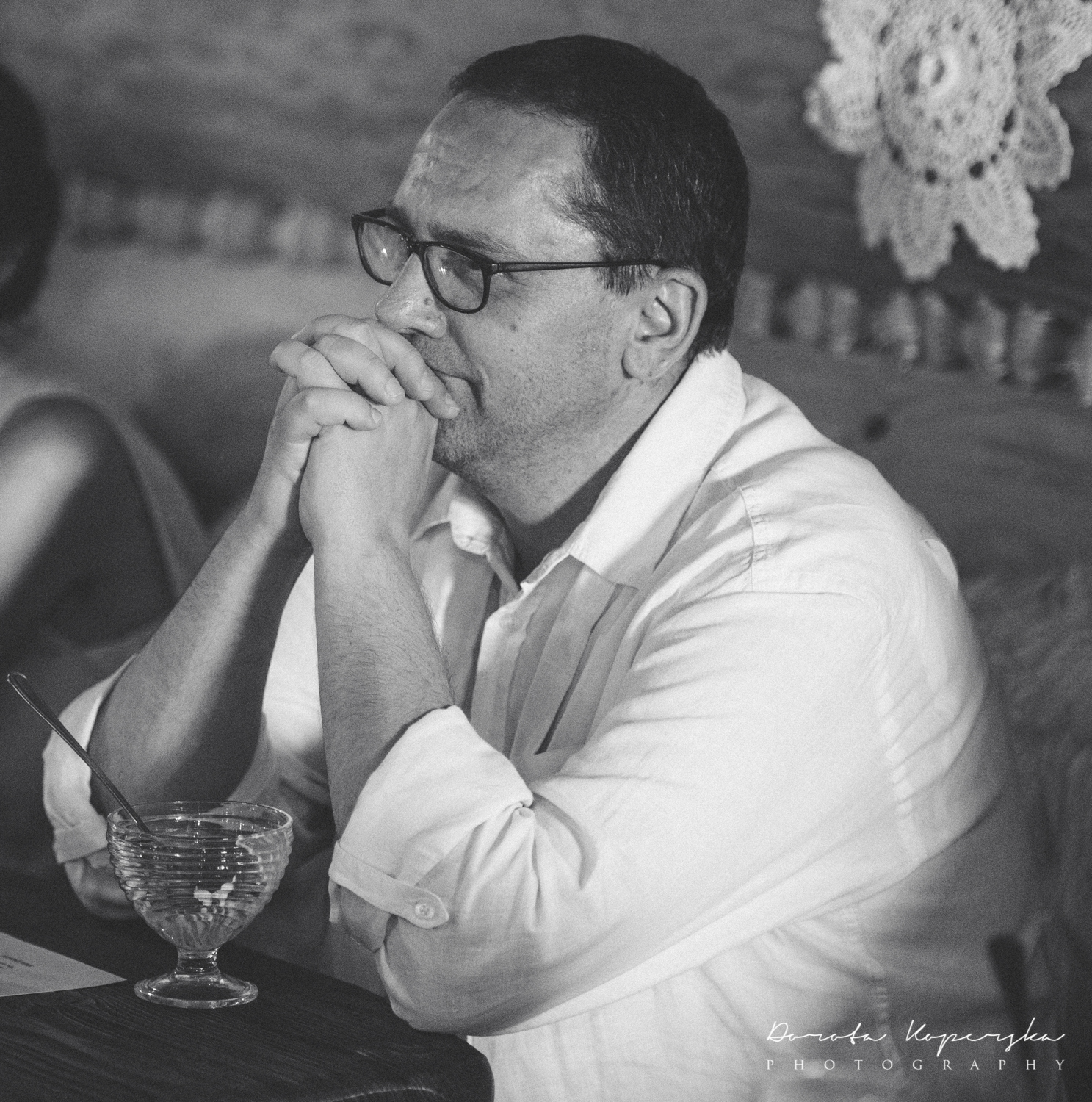
Jacek Proszyk (2017)

Jacek Józef Proszyk (born 7 May 1973 in Szamotuły) is a Polish historian and religions scholar. He specializes in the history of Jews and Protestants and in the history of southern Poland and Czech Silesia.

== Life ==
Jacek Proszyk graduated from the University of Warsaw in 2000 with a magister (Master of Arts) degree for a thesis on Jewish Institutions and Philanthropic Organisations in Bielsko and Biała in 1860–1939. In 2010 he was on a scholarship at the Hebrew University of Jerusalem. In 2012 he received his doktor (Ph.D.) degree from the Institute of Religious Studies at Kraków's Jagiellonian University for his dissertation, At the Crossroads of Orthodoxy, Haskalah, and Zionism: Social and Religious Transformations in the Jewish Religious Communities of Bielsko and Biała Krakowska in 1918–1939. He has taught in secondary-school and academic settings. His current post is with the History Department of the Bielsko-Biała Museum and Castle.

== Work ==
Since 1998 he has been cooperating with the Jewish Community in Bielsko-Biała, managing the library and the archive. The Jewish community in Bielsko-Biała covers the territory of Oświęcim (Auschwitz); this is why he participated in the recovery of the former Oświęcim Synagogue, which was later handed over to Auschwitz Jewish Center in Oświęcim. In 2004, on behalf of the Jewish community in Bielsko-Biała, the owner of the allotment where the great synagogue in Oświęcim used to be, he managed the technical organisation of the archaeological excavation on the site of the former dismantled Jewish synagogue in Oświęcim. During the excavations, he documented all the retrieved objects. Nearly 400 kg of valuable metal Judaica from the synagogue were found on that occasion. During the excavations, an Israeli film director, Yahali Gad, shot a movie, which was presented in 2005. The movie was titled "A Treasure in Auschwitz".

In 2002 he was one of the people who rewrote the original of the Polish Brest Bible dating back to 1563, when it was reissued. In 1992–2011 he prepared more than 5000 detailed lists and photos of tombstones at Jewish cemeteries in the following locations, among others: Bielsko-Biała, Bircza, Cieszyn, Frysztak, Jasło, Kolbuszowa, Krosno, Nowy Sącz, Oświęcim, Sieniawa, Skoczów, Tyrawa Wołoska, Ulanów, Wschowa, Żywiec-Zablocie. In 2000–2010 he cooperated with the United States Holocaust Memorial Museum office in Warsaw and performed searches in the Polish State Archives. In 2007–2013 he wrote and directed more than 20 theatrical stories related to the history of Bielsko-Biała and the southern Poland for the Polish Theatre in Bielsko-Biała. The stories were very popular and well received by the local audience. It was through his initiative that numerous Jewish cemeteries in Poland were put in order, a few monuments and commemorative plaques were put up in the places where demolished synagogues used to stand and a lot of historical and genealogical research was conducted.

In 2008, he discovered the only surviving original object from the demolished the oldest synagogue of Maharshal in Lublin. It was a parochet from 1926, which is now preserved in the Jewish Community in Bielsko-Biala. In 2018 he discovered previously unknown photographs of Auschwitz concentration camp prisoners removing unexploded bombs in Czechowice. The photos were handed over to the Auschwitz-Birkenau Memorial and Museum.

Jacek Proszyk was supposed to have worked up Bielsko County for the 2018 study, Dalej jest noc, but "[found it impossible to obtain] data sufficiently reliable to… perform statistical analysis and [to determine] the exact number of persons who perished, the exact number… who survived, and how they survived." Proszyk concluded that he could only "describe… verified individual cases. The war", he writes, "was a great DESTRUCTION and LIE. We do not have… complete archival records… Even what we have is not always the truth… [I]n Bielsko and Biała [which were only part of the county he was to have covered, in order to survive] Jews, Poles, and [anti-Nazi] Germans [all had to flee, lie, or pretend to be what they were not]. This falsehood left its [imprint] in the records and accounts, and that is why I [felt compelled] to verify… every account and every entry." Proszyk was unable to submit generalized findings for Bielsko County, but hopes eventually to prepare a study of particular individuals' experiences there. Proszyk's experience highlights the methodological difficulties in undertaking a reliable study of such subject matter.

Proszyk is an active editor of Wikipedia.

== Awards and recognition ==
- 2016, Maria and Łukasz Hirszowicz Awards – Jewish Historical Institute, Warsaw
- 1998, honorary badge “For the contribution to the Bielsko Voivodeship” – for preserving historical monuments
- 1998, honorary diploma “For preserving Jewish monuments” – the Israeli Ambassador to Poland

== Publications ==
- Proszyk, Jacek; Szyndler, Artur (2018). The Jewish Cemetery in Oświęcim. History, Symbols, Nature. Oświęcim, Poland: Auschwitz Jewish Center. ISBN 978-83-932853-2-7.
- Proszyk, Jacek (2018). History of the first B'nei B'rith Jewish Humanitarian Association in the Austro-Hungarian Empire. "Austria – Ezra" B'nei B'rith Bielitz (Bielsko) 1889-1938 (PDF). Bielsko-Biala, Poland: Passio Creatio Society. ISBN 978-83-943384-1-1.
- Proszyk, Jacek (2018). Aron Halberstam and Hasidim in Biala (Galicia) (PDF). Bielsko-Biala, Poland: Passio Creatio Society. ISBN 978-83-943384-0-4.
- Proszyk, Jacek (2015). 150 lat Gminy Wyznaniowej Żydowskiej w Bielsku (150 years of the Jewish Religious Community in Bielsko). Bielsko-Biala, Poland. ISBN 978-83-942613-2-0.
- Proszyk, Jacek (2014). The history of Jews in Bielsko (Bielitz) and Biala between 17th century and 1939. Liberals, Zionists and Orthodox Jews on the border of Galicia and Austrian Silesia. Jaworze, Poland: Haskala. ISBN 978-83-936155-2-0.
- Proszyk, Jacek (2012). Życie według wartości. Żydowscy liberałowie, ortodoksi i syjoniści w Bielsku-Białej. Jaworze, Poland: Haskala. ISBN 978-83-936155-0-6.
- Proszyk, Jacek (2009). Salomon Joachim Halberstamm bibliofil. Bielsko-Biała, Poland: G.M.Elzewir. ISBN 978-83-917046-5-3.
- Proszyk, Jacek (2002). Cmentarz żydowski w Bielsku-Białej (The Jewish Cemetery in Bielsko-Biala). Bielsko-Biała, Poland: Urząd Miejski w Bielsku-Białej. ISBN 83-908913-1-X.

Selected articles

- Proszyk, Jacek. "Unknown photographs of Auschwitz prisoners - Tschechowitz I Bombensucherkommando". bielsko.biala.pl.
- Proszyk, Jacek (2017). "Dom przedpogrzebowy na cmentarzu żydowskim w Bielsku-Białej (Pre-burial house at the Jewish cemetery in Bielsko-Biała)". Wiadomości Konserwatorskie Województwa Śląskiego. 9 (Katowice, Poland): 286–299. ISBN 978-83-945841-7-7.
- Proszyk, Jacek (2010). "Austria – Ezra B'nei B'rith Jewish Humanitarian Association In Bielsko (Bielitz) (1889-1938)". Studia Judaica. 13 (Krakow, Poland): 253–291.
- Proszyk, Jacek (2010). Polityka narodowościowa i rasowa. II wojna światowa 1939-1945 (National and racial politics. World War II 1939-1945) [in:] Bielsko-Biała, Monografia Miasta, tom IV, Bielsko-Biała w latach 1918-2009. Bielsko-Biała. pp. 375–385. ISBN 978-83-60136-46-1.
- Proszyk, Jacek (2005). Obrządek pogrzebowy w tradycji żydowskiej. Pochówki zwłok, świętych ksiąg i przedmiotów kultu religijnego / Funeral rite in the Jewish tradition. Burials of corpses, sacred books and religious objects [in:] Nekropolie, Kirkuty, Cmentarze. Szczecin. ISBN 83-919654-8-1.
- Proszyk, Jacek (2005). Biblijna symbolika eschatologiczna na XVII i XVIII-wiecznych nagrobkach z cmentarza ewangelickiego we Wschowie/ Biblical eschatological symbolism on 17th and 18th century tombstones from the Evangelical cemetery in Wschowa [in:] Doskonałość. Zbawienie. Rodzina. Z badań nad protestantyzmem. Krakow.
- Proszyk, Jacek (2001). A History of Jewish Social Welfare in Bielsko 1860-1939 [in:] Jews in Silesia. Krakow. ISBN 978-8371884108.
- Proszyk, Jacek (1998). Jewish families from Skoczów and from the Skoczów area [in:] In the shadow of Skoczów synagogue. Bielsko-Biała. pp. 116–144. ISBN 83-911161-0-7.
- Proszyk, Jacek (1998). List of tombstones on Jewish Cemetery in Skoczów- Wilamowice, Poland [in:] In the shadow of Skoczów synagogue. Bielsko-Biała. pp. 145–146. ISBN 83-911161-0-7.
