= Maharshal's Synagogue =

Destroyed synagogue in Lublin, Poland

- Polish: Synagoga Maharszala
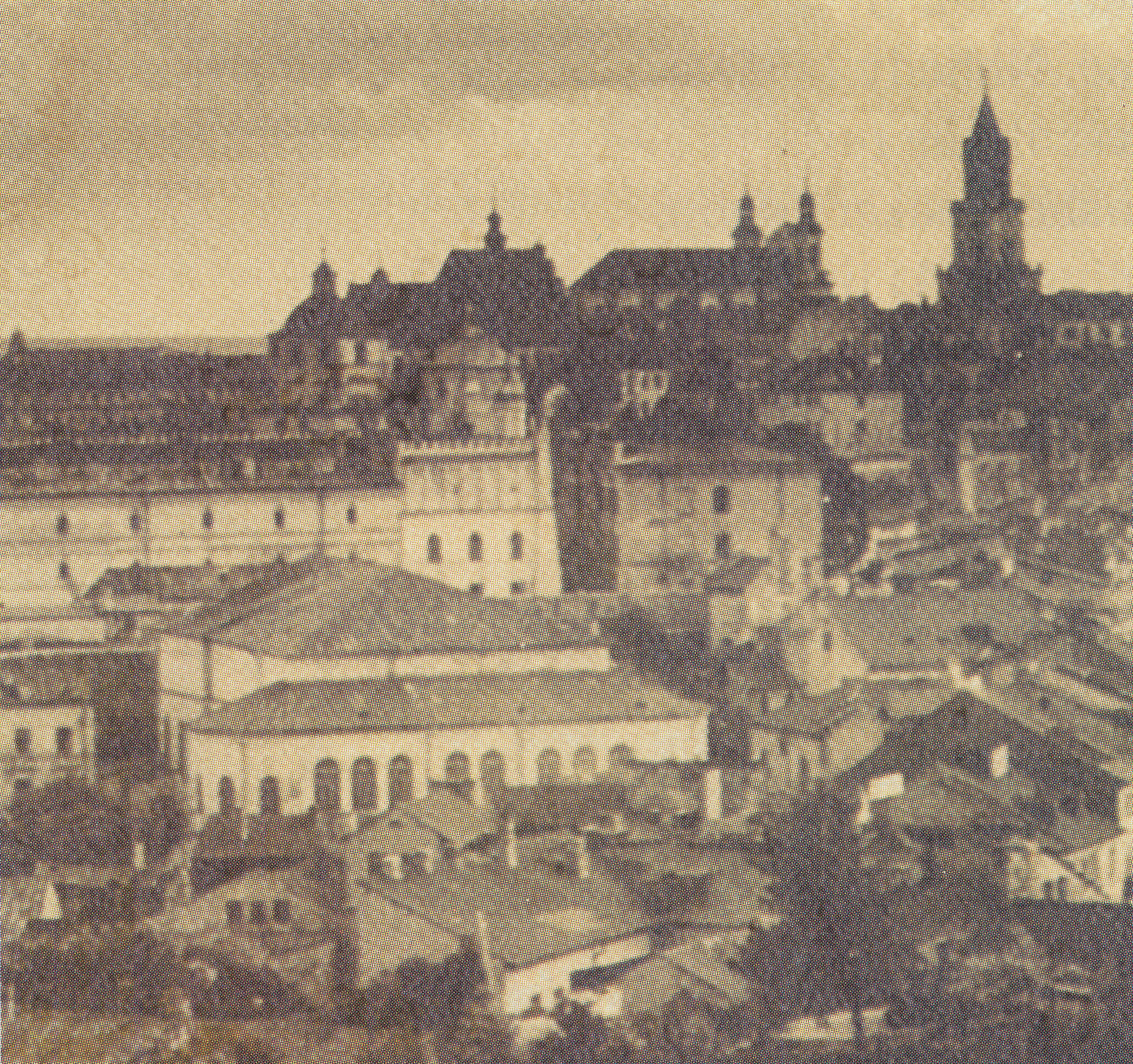
- The former synagogue, in the Jewish quarter, in 1938

- Location of the destroyed synagogue in Lublin Voivodeship

Religion
- Affiliation: Orthodox Judaism (former)
- Ecclesiastical or organizational status: Synagogue (1567–1942)
- Status: Destroyed

Location
- Location: 3 Jateczna Street, Lublin, Lublin Voivodeship
- Country: Poland
- Interactive map of Maharshal's Synagogue
- Coordinates: 51°15′04″N 22°34′20″E

Architecture
- Type: Synagogue architecture
- Style: Renaissance; Baroque
- Completed: 1567
- Destroyed: 1942
- Materials: Brick

The Maharshal's Synagogue (Polish: Synagoga Maharszala), also known as the Great Lublin Synagogue (Yiddish: מהרשל־שול), was a former Orthodox Jewish congregation and synagogue, that was located on the northern slope of castle hill at the now nonexistent 3 Jateczna Street, in Lublin, in the Lublin Voivodeship of Poland. The synagogue served as a house of prayer until World War II when it was destroyed by Nazis in 1942.

It was the largest synagogue in Lublin, and was the oldest known building in Poland with a four-pillar bema. Together with the Maharam's Synagogue and Shive Kryjem Synagogue, it was part of the synagogue complex in the Podzamcze area.

== History ==
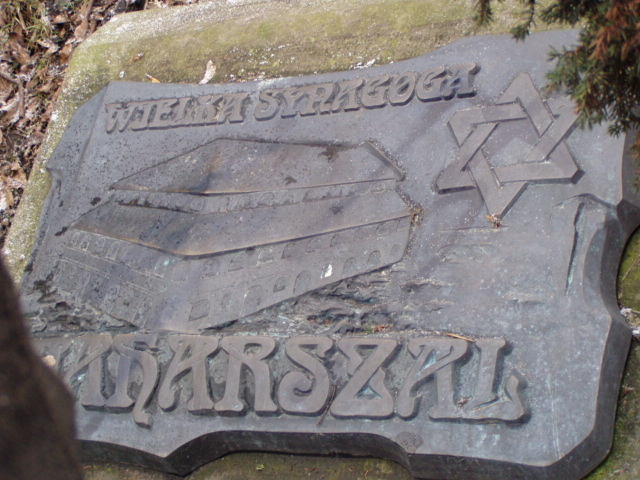
Memorial plaque

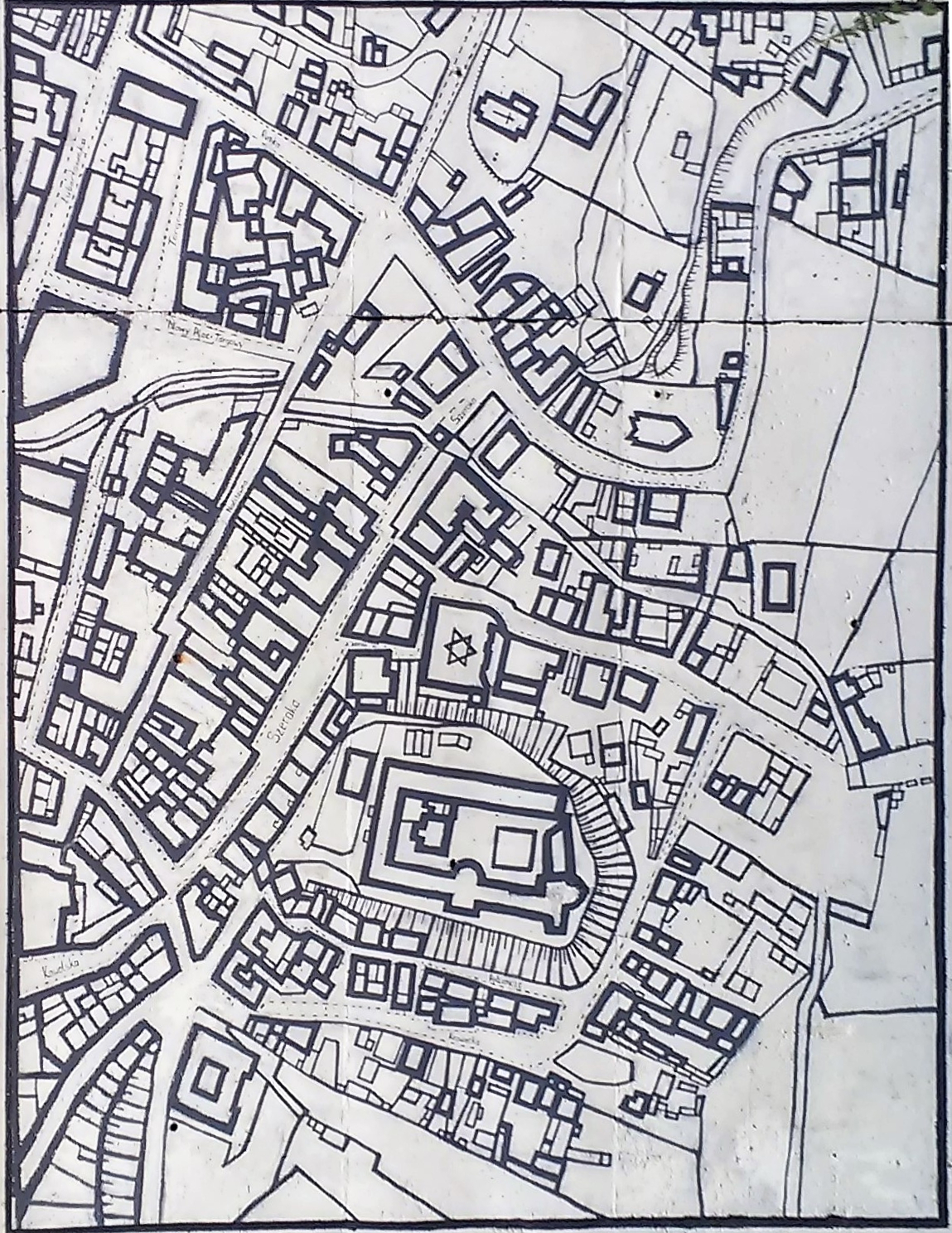
Fragment of the mural by the Czechówka river near the Castle Terraces in Lublin, depicting a map of the Jewish district (a reproduction of the 1928 map), with the Maharshal's Synagogue marked by a Star of David

The synagogue was built around 1567 thanks to a privilege granted on August 25 of that year by the King of Poland, Sigismund II Augustus, to the Jews of Lublin. It was constructed on a plot donated by Dr. Isaac May. At the same time, the Jewish community received permission to build the first yeshiva, which was housed in the synagogue building. The fame of this yeshiva was so great that Jewish students from all over Europe came to study there. The synagogue was named in honor of the Lublin rector and rabbi Solomon Luria, known as Maharshal. In the late 16th or early 17th century, a smaller building called the Maharam's Synagogue, intended for Shabbat services, was added to its southern wall. Together, they could accommodate more than 3,000 worshippers.

There are accounts that the entire synagogue complex housed both the offices of the qahal and the first Lublin yeshiva. It also contained a small jail for those who committed offenses against the religion or the community. The likely remnant of this jail was a small prayer room in the vestibule of the synagogue, referred to in 19th-century documents as Shive Kryjem.

During the Cossack-Moscow invasion of Lublin in 1655, the synagogue was completely burned down. It was quickly rebuilt, but the yeshiva ceased to operate. Over the years, it fell into disrepair and neglect, leading to a structural collapse on the night after Yom Kippur in 1854, when the building's ceilings caved in. A lengthy and arduous reconstruction was completed in 1866, although the synagogue no longer retained its Baroque character. Only the original outline of the exterior walls and the Torah ark were preserved from the old synagogue.

=== During World War II ===
During World War II, the German occupation authorities ordered the synagogue to be closed for religious purposes. Due to its large area, the interior was used as a shelter for the poor, refugees, and displaced persons, as well as a communal kitchen for the poor Jews in the ghetto. In March and April 1942, the Nazis completely devastated the synagogue's interior and turned it into a gathering point for people being transported to the Belzec extermination camp. On average, about 1,500 Jews were gathered there each night before being marched through Kalinowszczyzna to the ramp behind the municipal slaughterhouse, from where trains departed for Belzec. After the liquidation of the Lublin Ghetto, the synagogue was blown up.

After the war, the ruins of the synagogue, including the bema, remained standing for several years. They were demolished in 1954 by order of the city's authorities due to the construction of Tysiąclecia Avenue (now Solidarności Avenue). The synagogue is commemorated only by a granite plaque with an inscription in Polish, Yiddish, and Hebrew:

In this place stood the Maharshal's and Maharam's synagogues, built in 1567, destroyed by the Germans in 1942.

In 2007, the Grodzka Gate – NN Theatre initiated the creation of a three-dimensional computer model of the Maharshal's Synagogue. The project, developed using virtual reality technology by Krzysztof Mucha from the company Servodata Elektronik, took half a year to complete.

== Architecture ==
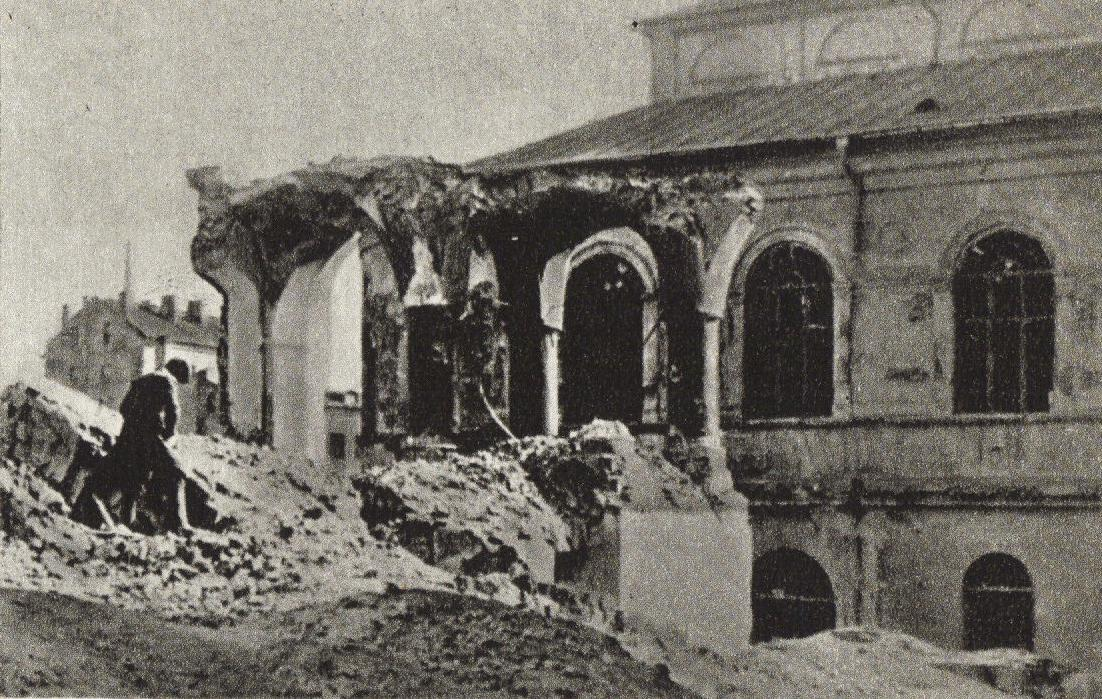
Destruction of the Jewish District in Lublin. In the background, the Maharshal's Synagogue

The masonry building of the synagogue was constructed on an irregular rectangular plan, originally in a Renaissance and Baroque styles. There is no information about the layout of the synagogues before the fire of 1656. The only traces of their outlines before the 1856 fire are found on city plans from 1783, around 1800, 1823, and 1829. On all these plans, they stand out due to their size. The outline on the 1823 plan is similar to the measurement drawing from 1920. To this day, several photos, drawings, and architectural plans from the interwar period have survived, providing insight into the external appearance and interior of the synagogue.

The elevations with characteristic vertical divisions with pilasters and semi-circular window openings indicated the building's two-story structure. Above the windows was a cornice that crowned the entire elevation. The building was covered with a triple-pitched broken roof, topped with sheet metal and gabled on the western side.

The interior of the synagogue had two floors, a basement, and an attic. On the ground floor, there were 10 rooms: a vestibule, the Shive Kryjem synagogue, a staircase, the northern babinets, the babinets of the Maharam's Synagogue, a staircase, and a vestibule of the babinets. The upper floor also had 10 rooms: the main prayer hall, the western and northern babinets, and three staircases. The rooms on the floors were separated by walls with door openings for communication and also contained windows.

The main prayer hall, encompassing two floors, was a square space measuring 16 by 16 m. It was topped by a vault consisting of four intersecting barrel vaults with lunettes, stretched between the walls and a massive central pier that supported the double-entry bema surrounded by a wrought-iron baluster. The bema stood on a square platform with four structural supports, each made up of three slender columns with Corinthian capitals. Above them, a richly segmented entablature supported a superstructure with semicircular arcades. This was crowned by a large cornice directly supporting the vault's ribs.

On the eastern wall was a modest Renaissance-Baroque Torah ark, standing in the center of a large decorative structure flanked by pilasters and topped with the Tablets of the Ten Commandments, symbolically adorned by a pair of lions. To its right stood the cantor's pulpit. The low babinets were adjacent to the main hall from the north and west, likely added during the 1656 reconstruction. Through several small, barred windows, women could observe the service. The interior contained numerous candlesticks funded by the wealthiest Jews of Lublin.

== Parochet ==
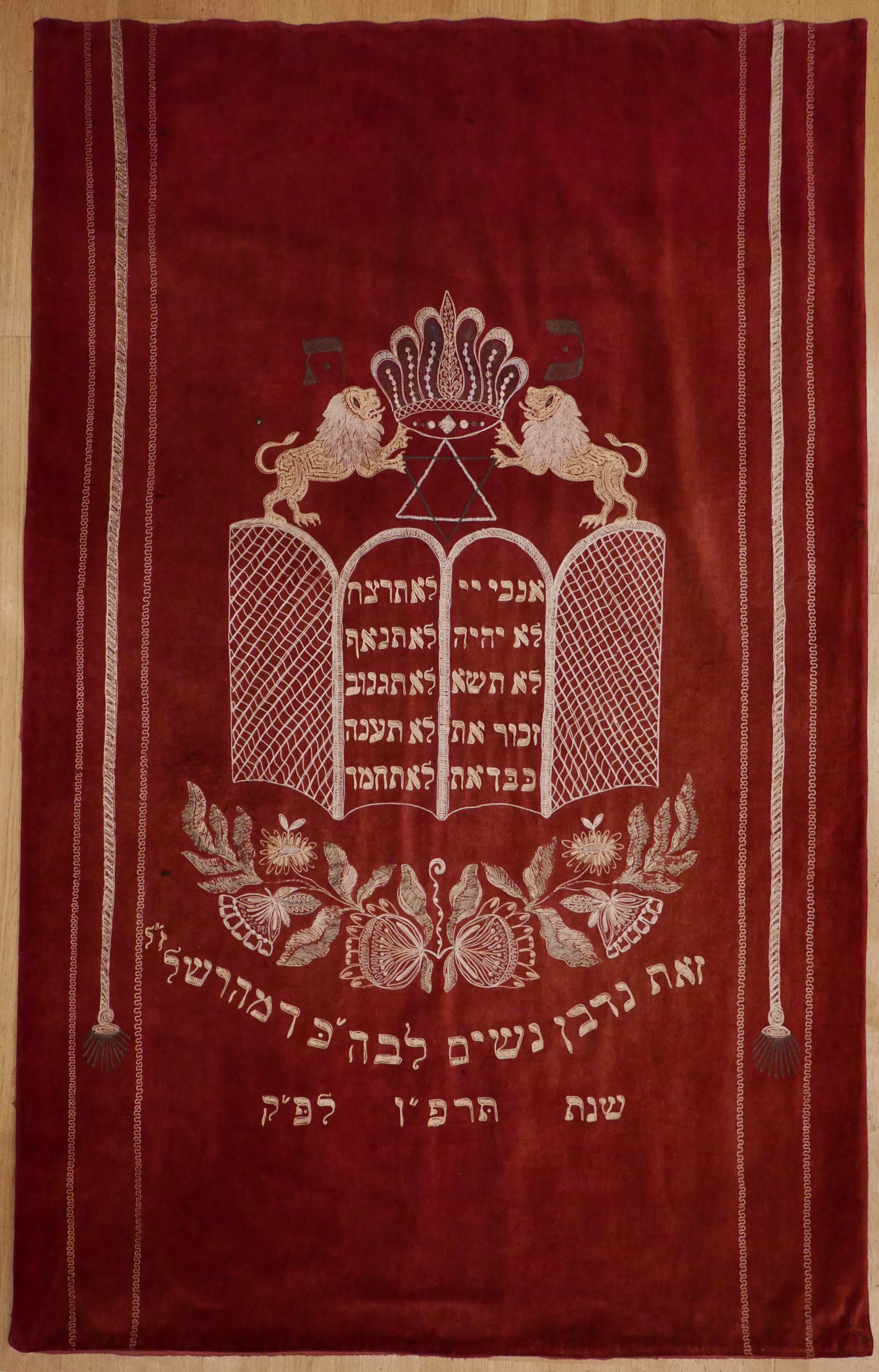
Parochet

A velvet parochet, funded by women in 1925 or 1926, survived, measuring 180 by 120 cm (71 by 47 in). Since 1945, ihe parochet has been used in the synagogue of the Jewish religious community in Bielsko-Biała in Bielsko-Biała. It is unknown how it came to be there. It was first listed in the inventory in 1945. The discovery was made in January 2008 by historian Jacek Proszyk during an inventory of items used in the Bielsko synagogue and the translation of the text embroidered on the parochet. The fabric features, among other things, the Ten Commandments in Hebrew, topped with a Torah crown supported by a pair of lions, and below, a Hebrew inscription:

This is a donation from the women to the Maharshal's Synagogue of blessed memory in the year (5)686 [which corresponds to 1925/1926].

== See also ==
- History of the Jews in Poland
- List of active synagogues in Poland
