= Lublin Ghetto =

Nazi ghetto in Lublin, German-occupied Poland

Coordinates: 51°15′11″N 22°34′18″E

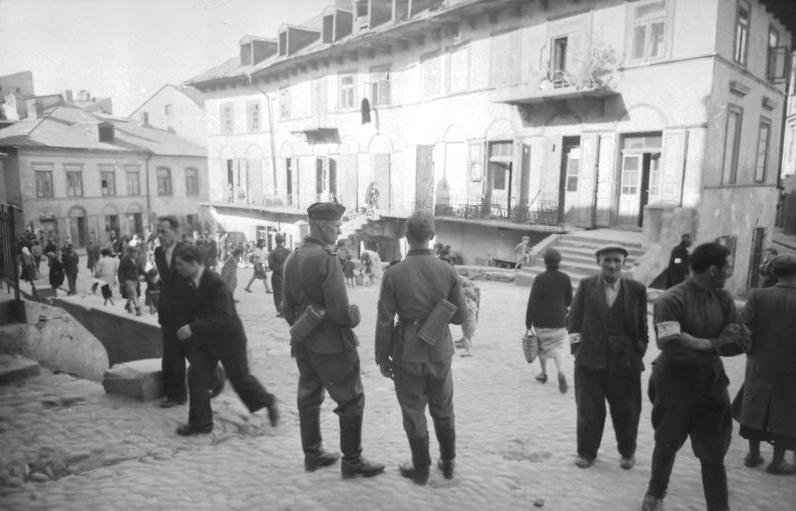
- Two German soldiers in the Lublin Ghetto, May 1941
- Also known as: German: Ghetto Lublin or Lublin Reservat
- Location: Lublin, German-occupied Poland
- Incident type: Imprisonment, forced labor, starvation, exile
- Organizations: SS
- Camp: deportations to Belzec extermination camp and Majdanek
- Victims: 34,000 Polish Jews

The Lublin Ghetto was a World War II ghetto created by Nazi Germany in the city of Lublin on the territory of General Government in occupied Poland. The ghetto inmates were mostly Polish Jews, although a number of Roma were also brought in. Set up in March 1941, the Lublin ghetto was one of the first Nazi-era ghettos slated for liquidation during the deadliest phase of the Holocaust in occupied Poland. Between mid-March and mid-April 1942 over 30,000 Jews were delivered to their deaths in cattle trucks at the Bełżec extermination camp and additional 4,000 at Majdanek.

== History ==
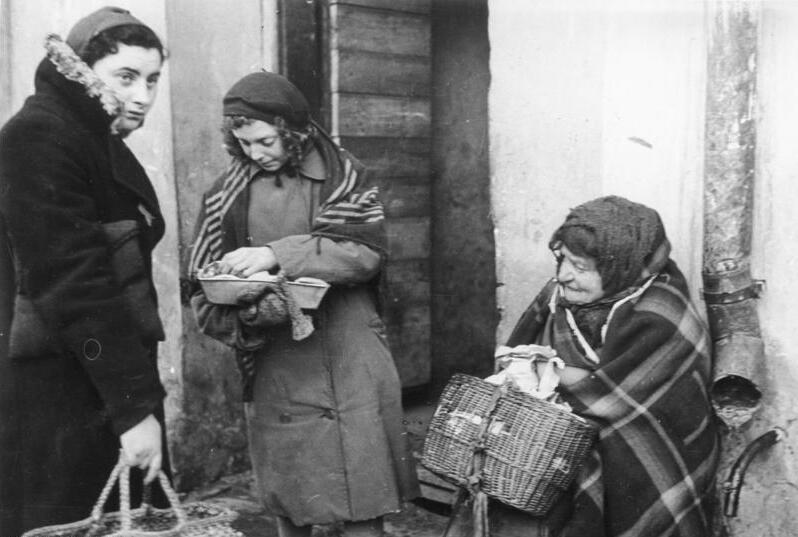
Jewish women in occupied Lublin, September 1939

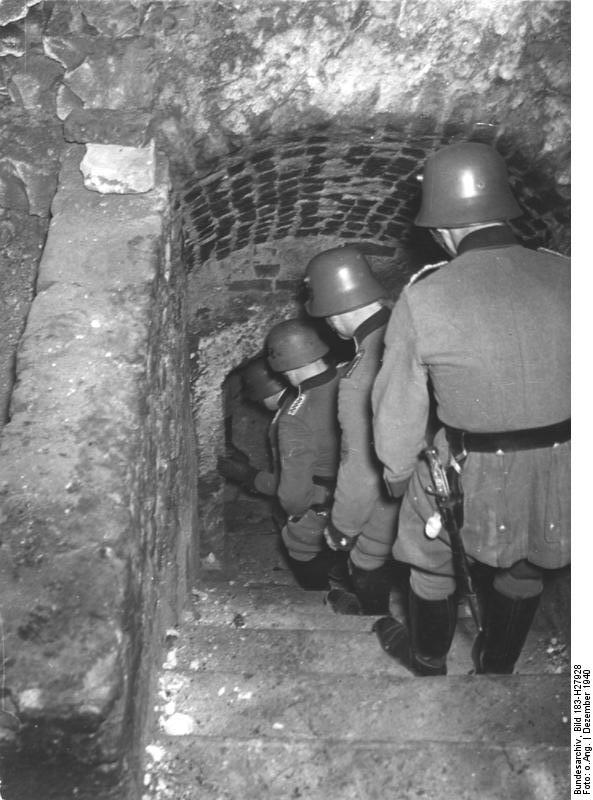
The German Order Police descending to the cellars on a "Jew hunt", Lublin, December 1940

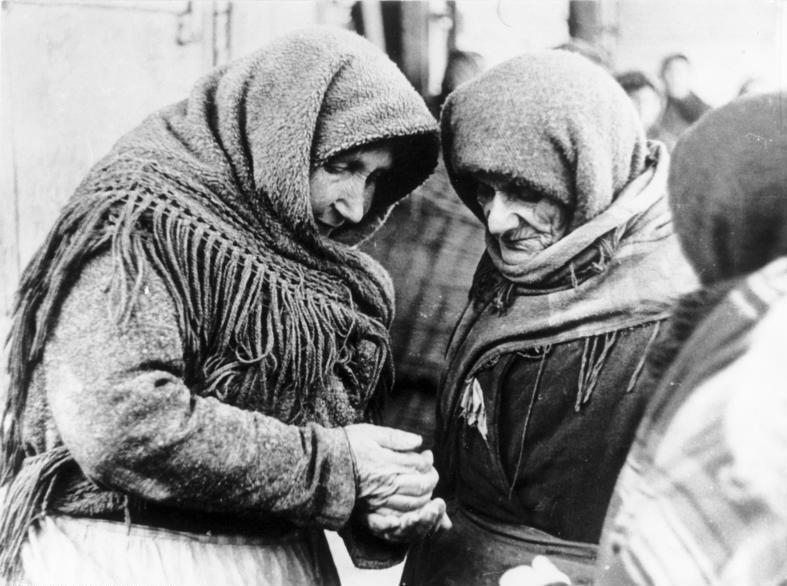
Elderly women in the Lublin Ghetto, 30 December 1939

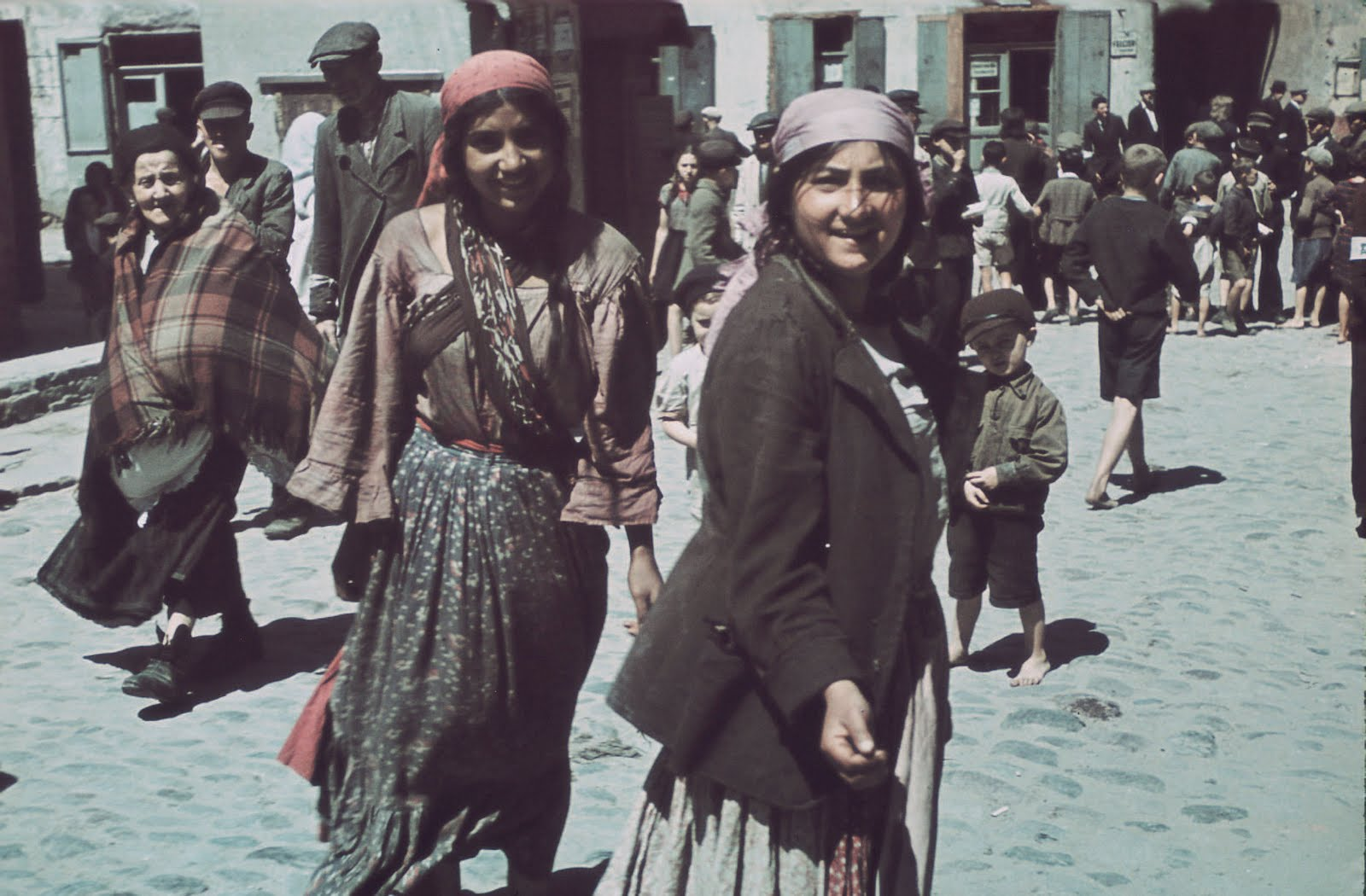
Romani women at Lublin Ghetto, 1941

Already in 1939–40, before the ghetto was officially pronounced, the SS and Police Leader Odilo Globocnik (the SS district commander who also ran the Jewish reservation), began to relocate the Lublin Jews further away from his staff headquarters at Spokojna Street, and into a new city zone set up for this purpose. Meanwhile, the first 10,000 Jews had been expelled from Lublin to the rural surroundings of the city beginning in early March.

The ghetto, referred to as the "Jewish quarter" (or Wohngebiet der Juden), was formally opened a year later on 24 March 1941. The expulsion and ghettoization of the Jews was decided when the arriving Wehrmacht troops preparing for the Operation Barbarossa, the invasion of the Soviet Union, needed housing close to the new German–Soviet frontier. The ghetto, the only one so far in the Lublin District of the General Government in 1941, was located around the area of the Podzamcze district, from the Grodzka Gate (renamed "Jewish Gate" to mark the boundary between the Jewish and non-Jewish sections of the city) and then along Lubartowska and Unicka streets, to the end of the Franciszkańska Street. Selected members of the prewar political parties such as the Jewish Bund in Poland were imprisoned in the Lublin Castle and continued to carry out their underground activities from there.

== Notable individuals ==
One widely feared collaborator was Szama (Shlomo) Grajer, owner of a Jewish restaurant and a brothel serving Nazis on Kowalska Street. Grajer was a Gestapo informer. Dressed like a German official, Grajer summoned to his restaurant a number of wealthy Jews and extracted a ransom of 20,000 zlotys from each of them. He also used to hunt for starving girls in the Ghetto for his Nazi brothel. Grajer eventually cornered the daughter of Judenrat president Marek Alten and married her. They were shot dead together during the final liquidation of Majdan.

== Liquidation ==
At the time of its establishment, the ghetto imprisoned 34,000 Polish Jews, and an unknown number of Roma people. Virtually all of them were dead by the war's end. Most of the victims, about 30,000, were deported to the Belzec extermination camp (some of them through the Piaski ghetto) between 17 March and 11 April 1942 by the Reserve Police Battalion 101 from Orpo helped by Schutzpolizei. The Germans set a daily quota of 1,400 inmates to be deported to their deaths. The other 4,000 people were first moved to the Majdan Tatarski ghetto – a small ghetto established in the suburb of Lublin – and then either killed there during roundups or sent to the nearby KL Lublin/Majdanek concentration camp.

The last of the Ghetto's former residents still in German captivity were murdered at Majdanek and Trawniki camps in Operation Harvest Festival on 3 November 1943. At the time of the liquidation of the ghetto, the German propaganda minister, Joseph Goebbels wrote in his diary, "The procedure is pretty barbaric, and not to be described here more definitely. Not much will remain of the Jews."

After liquidating the ghetto, German authorities employed a slave labor workforce of inmates of Majdanek to demolish and dismantle the area of the former ghetto, including in the nearby village of Wieniawa and the Podzamcze district. In a symbolic event, the Maharam's Synagogue (built in the 17th century in honor of Meir Lublin) was blown up. Several centuries of Jewish culture and society in Lublin were brought to an end. The Jewish prewar population of 45,000 constituting about a third of the town's total population of 120,000 in 1939 was eradicated.

A few individuals managed to escape the liquidation of the Lublin Ghetto and made their way to the Warsaw Ghetto, bringing the news of the Lublin destruction. The eyewitness evidence convinced some Warsaw Jews that in fact, the Germans were intent on exterminating the whole of the Jewish population in Poland. However, others, including head of the Warsaw's Judenrat, Adam Czerniaków, at the time dismissed these reports of mass murders as "exaggerations". Only 230 Lublin Jews are known to have survived the German occupation.

== See also ==
- Jewish ghettos in German-occupied Poland
- Lipowa 7 camp
- List of Nazi-era ghettos
- Operation Reinhard
- Henio Zytomirski murdered at the age of 9
- Richard Wendler, the Governor of the Lublin District
- Operation Harvest Festival conducted at Majdanek and its subcamps
