= Meir Lublin =

Polish rabbi

Rabbi Meir ben Gedalia מאיר בן גדליה
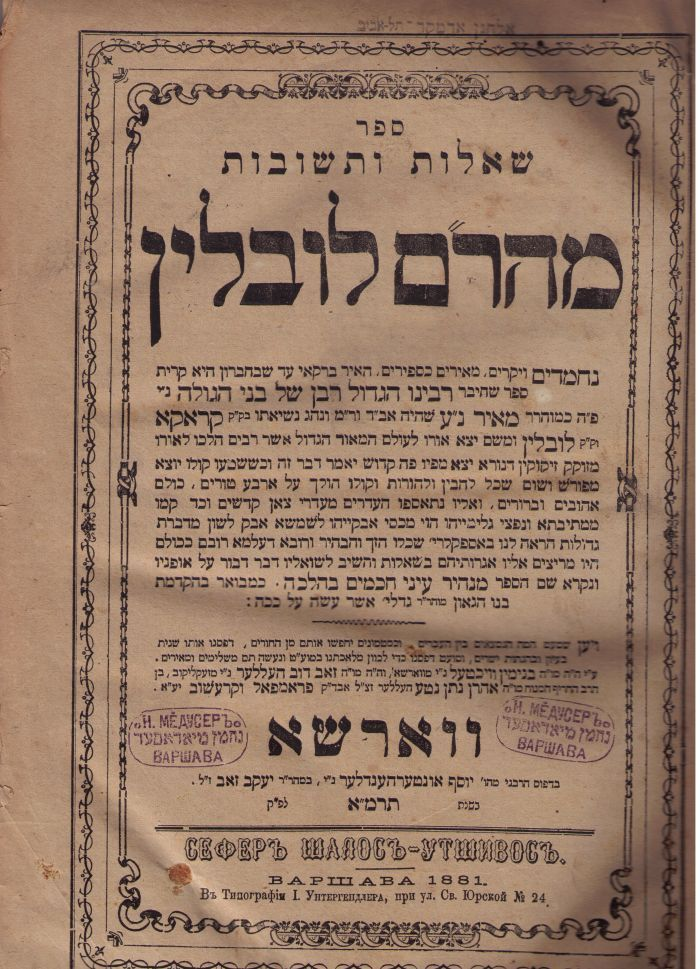
- Responsa of Meir Lublin
- Title: MaHaRam

Personal life
- Born: 1558 Lublin, Poland
- Died: 1616 (aged 57–58) Lublin, Poland
- Spouse: Esther ha-Kohen Shapiro
- Children: 7
- Parent: Gedalia Racheles (father)

Religious life
- Religion: Judaism

Meir Lublin or Meir ben Gedalia (1558 – 1616) was a Polish rabbi, Talmudist and Posek ("decisor of Jewish law"). He is well known for his commentary on the Talmud, Meir Einai Chachamim. He is also referred to as MaHaRam (Hebrew acronym: "Our Teacher, Rabbi Meir").

== Biography ==
MaHaRam was born in Lublin, Poland. He was descended from a family of rabbis, and his father, Gedalia, was an eminent Talmudist. His principal teacher was his father-in-law, Isaac ha-Kohen Shapiro, rabbi of Kraków. MaHaRam's knowledge of the Talmud and Poskim was such that he was invited to the rabbinate of Kraków in 1587, when he was not yet thirty years old. In 1591 he became rabbi at Lemberg, where he was engaged in a controversy with Rabbi Joshua Falk concerning a bill of divorce. In 1613 he became rabbi at Lublin and established a yeshiva. He was well known in the role of Rosh Yeshiva there, owing to his renown as a Talmudic scholar. Many of his students became prominent rabbis or heads of yeshivot; his most famous student is probably Isaiah Horowitz (Shelah HaKodesh). A daughter of the MaHaRam was married to Benjamin Beinisch Gelernter, whose parents were Rabbi Zachariah Mendel Gelernter and the daughter of the Maharal of Prague. One of his sisters married Yehuda ha-Kohen Katz and they had Moshe ha-Kohen Katz as their son, who in turn will marry Nessla Wahl, granddaughter of Saul Wahl, who is said to have been King of Poland for one day, and with whom he had six children.

While the MaHaRam served as Dayan and Rabbi in Lemberg a dispute broke out between him and Rabbi Joshua Falk (known as the Sema) regarding a bill of divorce. The controversy turned out ugly and the MaHaRam offended the honor of rabbi Joshua Falk. Rabbi Abraham Shrenzel, a student of Joshua Falk and an influential scholar, thus avenged the honor of his rabbi and the MaHaRam was forced to leave the city by order of the local government.

R' Meir was a sharp polemicist and critical of the people around him, and did not refrain from criticizing the most respected scholars of his generation, including the Rema, Beis Yosef, Maharsha, Maharshal. He even disagreed with the Rishonim when he felt that they have erred. He was forceful in rejecting opinions of his own "without any doubt, and there is no way of settling [the issue] in any other way." When the Maharsha's commentary to the Talmud was first printed, he dismissed it and wrote, "from what I wrote you can see that he can't find his hands and feet in the house of learning, and it is an error." Only later when he realized that the Maharsha was a greatly respected scholar, he confessed to him "and what happened happened, and love covers all sins." When a rabbi in Worms, whom he thought to be a lesser authority than him, rejected his opinion he was deeply offended. He writes that he wanted to embarrass him in the synagogue of Lublin and to convene with the leaders of the communities to demote him from his position, but he decided not to because "perhaps it will be an honor for him that a person like me is occupied with someone like him".

While he served as the head of the Yeshiva in Lublin, R' Shimon Wolf Auerbach, the son-in-law of the Maharshal, headed another Yeshiva in the same town. They both had different styles of interpretation, and this usually lead to quarreling among the students as everyone claimed that their Rabbi had the correct way. From then on, the communal leaders decreed that the students could not tell one another of the new interpretation of the Rabbis and that whoever violated this ban would be expelled from the Yeshiva. However, this didn't last for too long. When the MaHaRam once had difficulty explaining Tosafot and was eager to find out how R' Shimon Wolf had resolved the issue, he asked his students to find out. When the right opportunity came up, they grabbed one of the students of R' Shimon Wolf, beat him up and forced him to repeat the interpretation of his Rabbi. When the MaHaRam heard of it, he openly declared that only his interpretation is the correct one. A great controversy flared up between the two Yeshivot. The leaders of Lublin decided that they would send a letter to Shlomo Aboav Rav of Amsterdam to decide which one is the correct interpretation, and whichever interpretation he deems appropriate, the other would lose the right to remain as head of the Yeshiva. When the answer came back from Amsterdam it was clear that it was in favor of R Shimon Wolf. The communal leaders decided to demote the MaHaRam of his position as head of the Yeshiva. But the humble R Shimon Wolf refused to accept this decision. Instead, they invited the Maharsha to assume the Rabbinate in Lublin. The Maharsha gave a sermon on Shabbat night and convinced the community of Lublin to keep both of these Torah giants among them, and the controversy ended.

== Works ==
Meir Einei Chachamim is his best known work, a "casuistic commentary" on the Talmud, Rashi, and Tosafot together. It was published by his son Gedaliah and has since been printed in all principal editions of the Talmud under the heading "MaHaRam." It is considered one of the important commentaries on the Talmud. The commentary, generally, employs short and simple explanations.

After his death, over 140 of the Halachic questions posed to him were published in a collection of responsa entitled Manhir Einei Chachamim.

== See also ==
- Maharam's Synagogue
