= Parochet =

Curtain that covers the Torah Ark in a synagogue

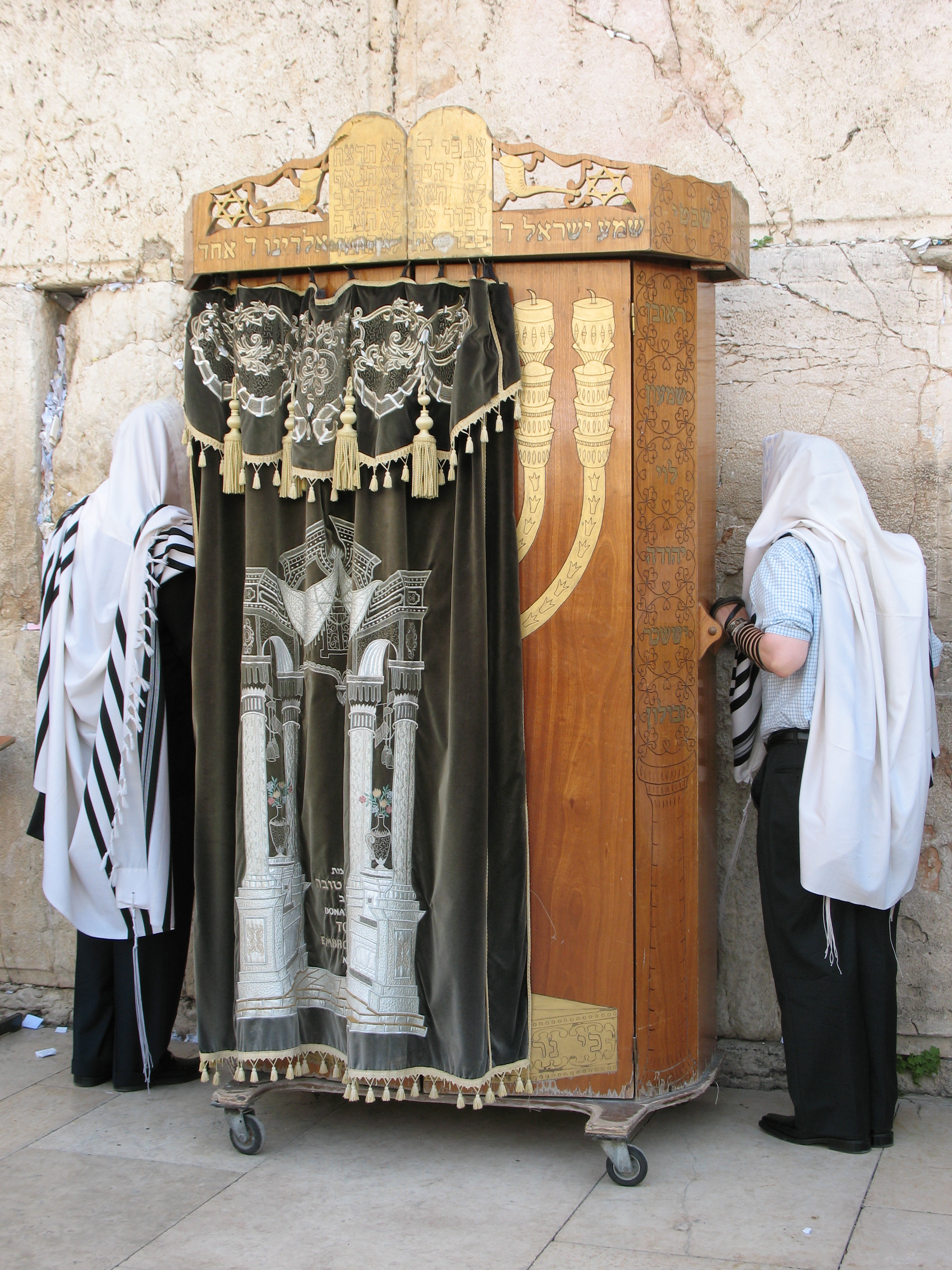
Parochet on a mobile ark at the Western Wall in Jerusalem

A parochet (Hebrew: פרוכת, romanized: parôkheth; Yiddish: פרוכת, romanized: paroykhes), meaning "curtain" or "screen", is the curtain that covers the Torah ark (Aron Kodesh) containing the Torah scrolls in a synagogue.

The parochet symbolizes the curtain that covered the Ark of the Covenant, based on Exodus 40:21: "Then he put up the curtain for screening, and screened off the Ark of the Pact—just as יהוה had commanded Moses."

In most synagogues, the parochet which is used all year round is replaced during the High Holy Days with a white one.

The term parochet is used in the Hebrew Bible to describe the curtain that separated the Holy of Holies from the main hall (Hebrew: היכל, romanized: hekhal) of the Temple in Jerusalem. Its use in synagogues is a reference to the centrality of the Temple to Jewish worship.

The Umberto Nahon Museum of Italian Jewish Art in Jerusalem houses the oldest surviving parochet, dating to 1572.

== Gallery ==
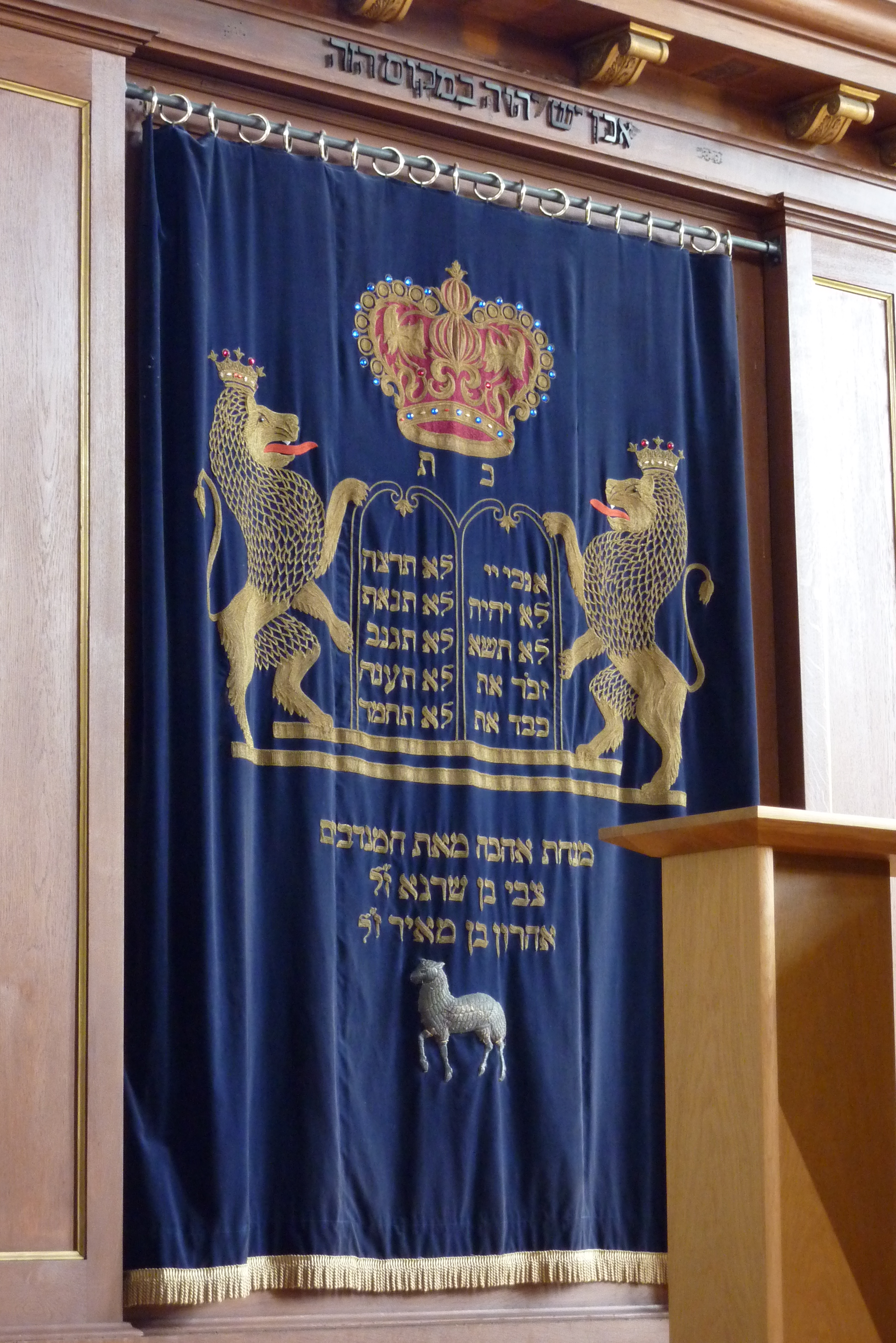
Parochet of the Synagoge in Mühlhausen

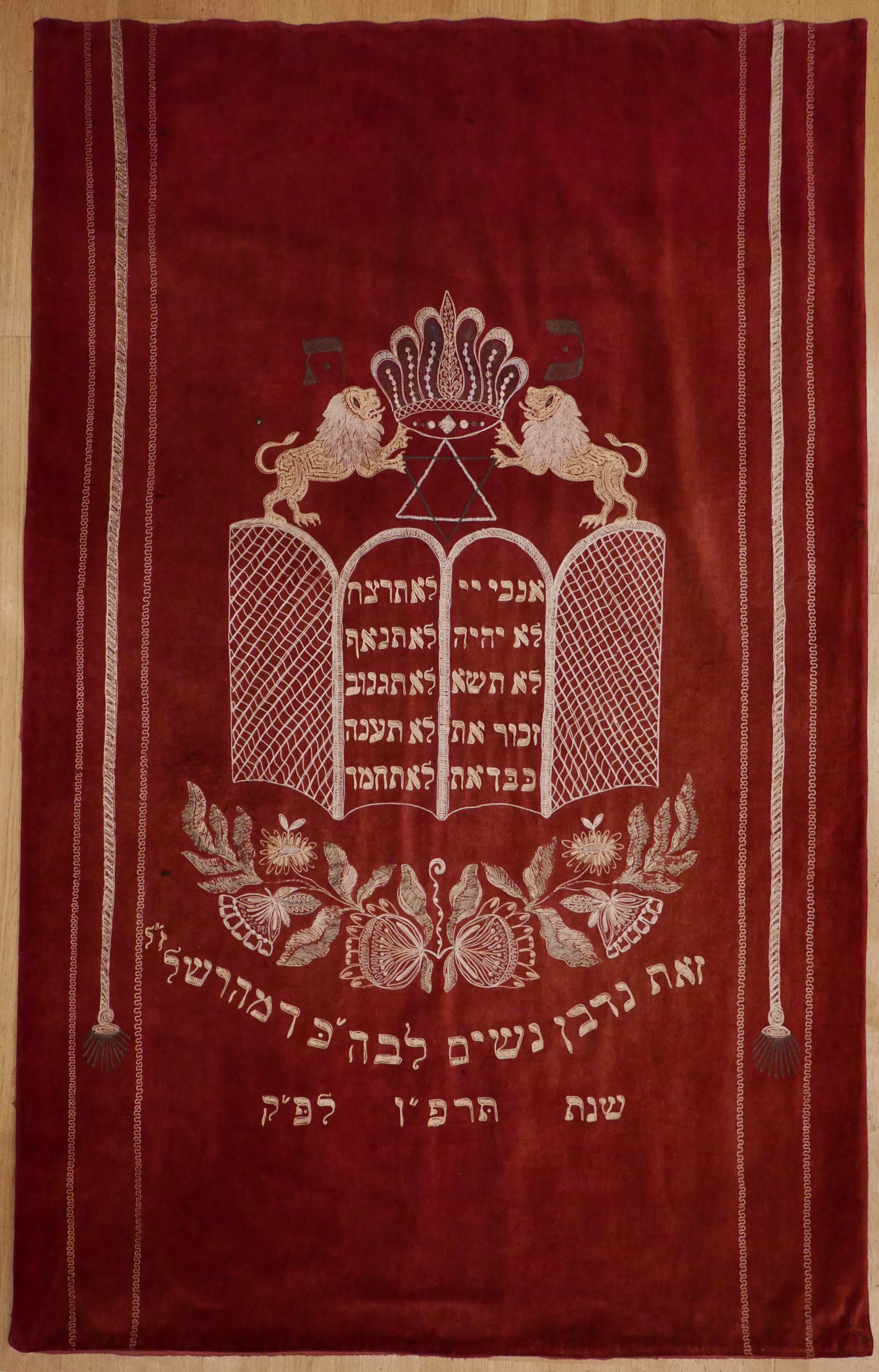
Original parochet from Great Lublin Maharshal's Synagogue from 1926, today in Bielsko-Biała synagogue, Poland

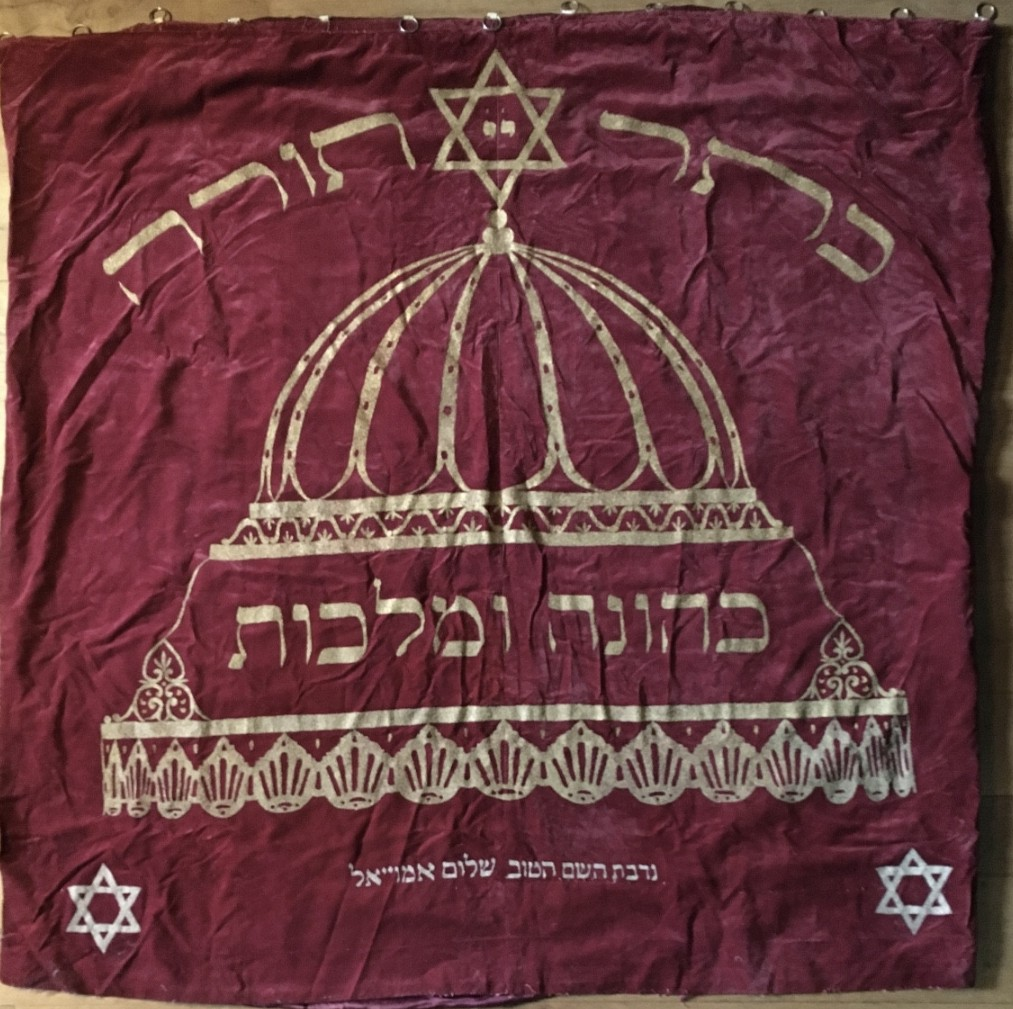
Dutch-Portuguese Sephardic Torah Ark Curtain (Parochet), probably associated with the Western Sephardic tradition of the Dutch Republic, c. 1760–1770. Silk velvet and metallic embroidery. Beatriz de Luna Art Collection, Covilhã, Portugal.

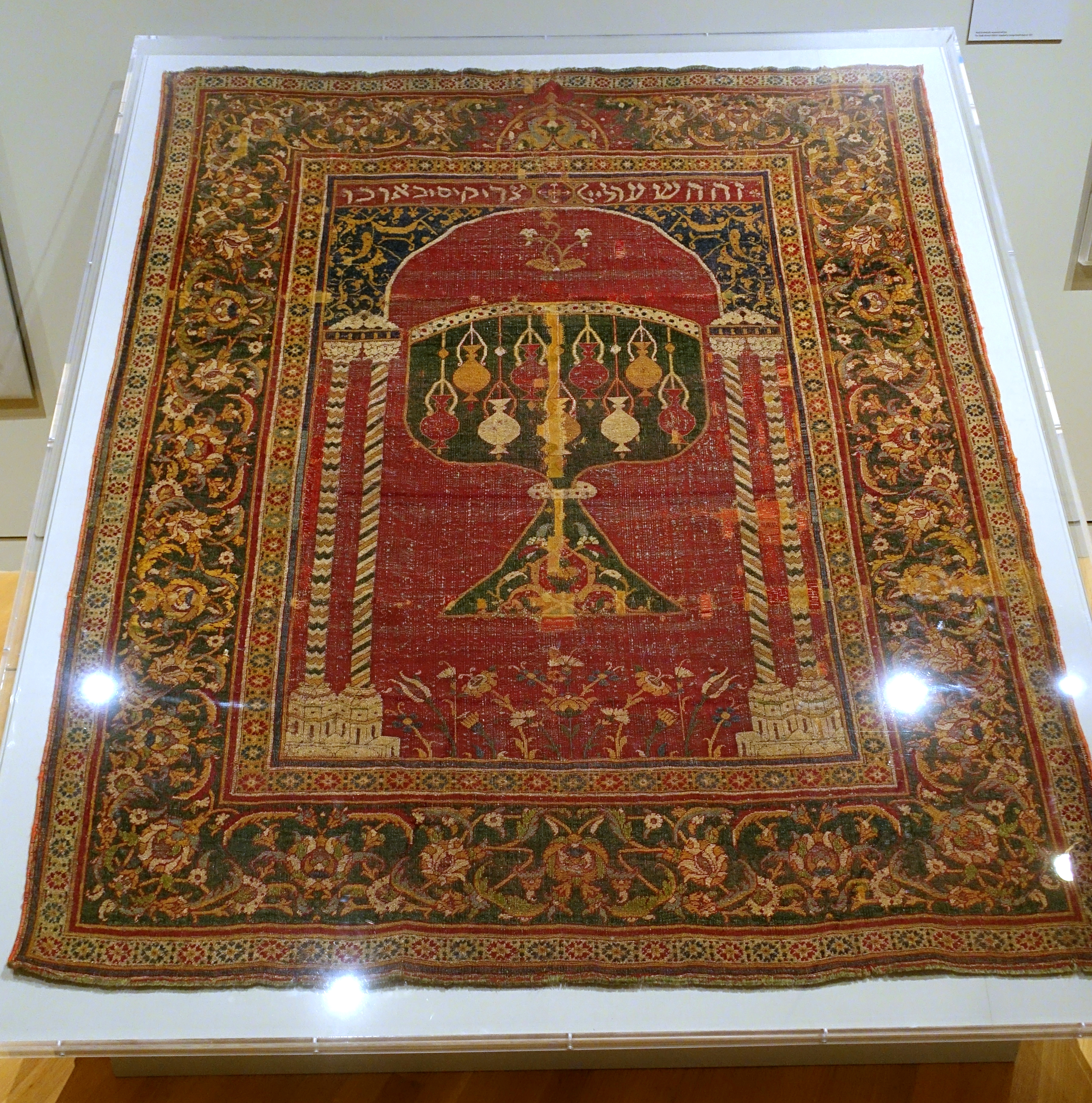
Early 17th-century parochet from Cairo, Egypt

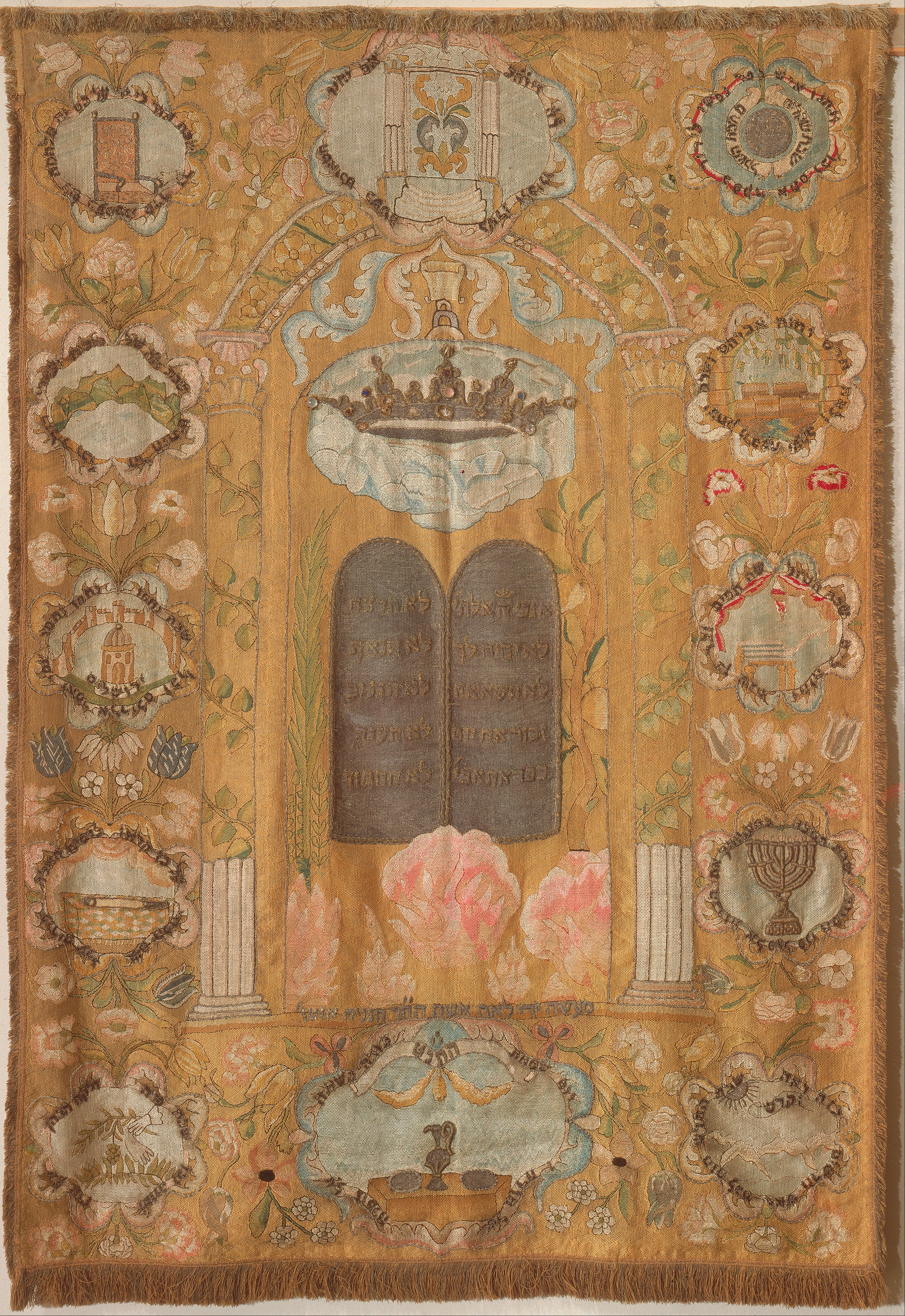
1698 linen and silk parochet from Venice, Italy

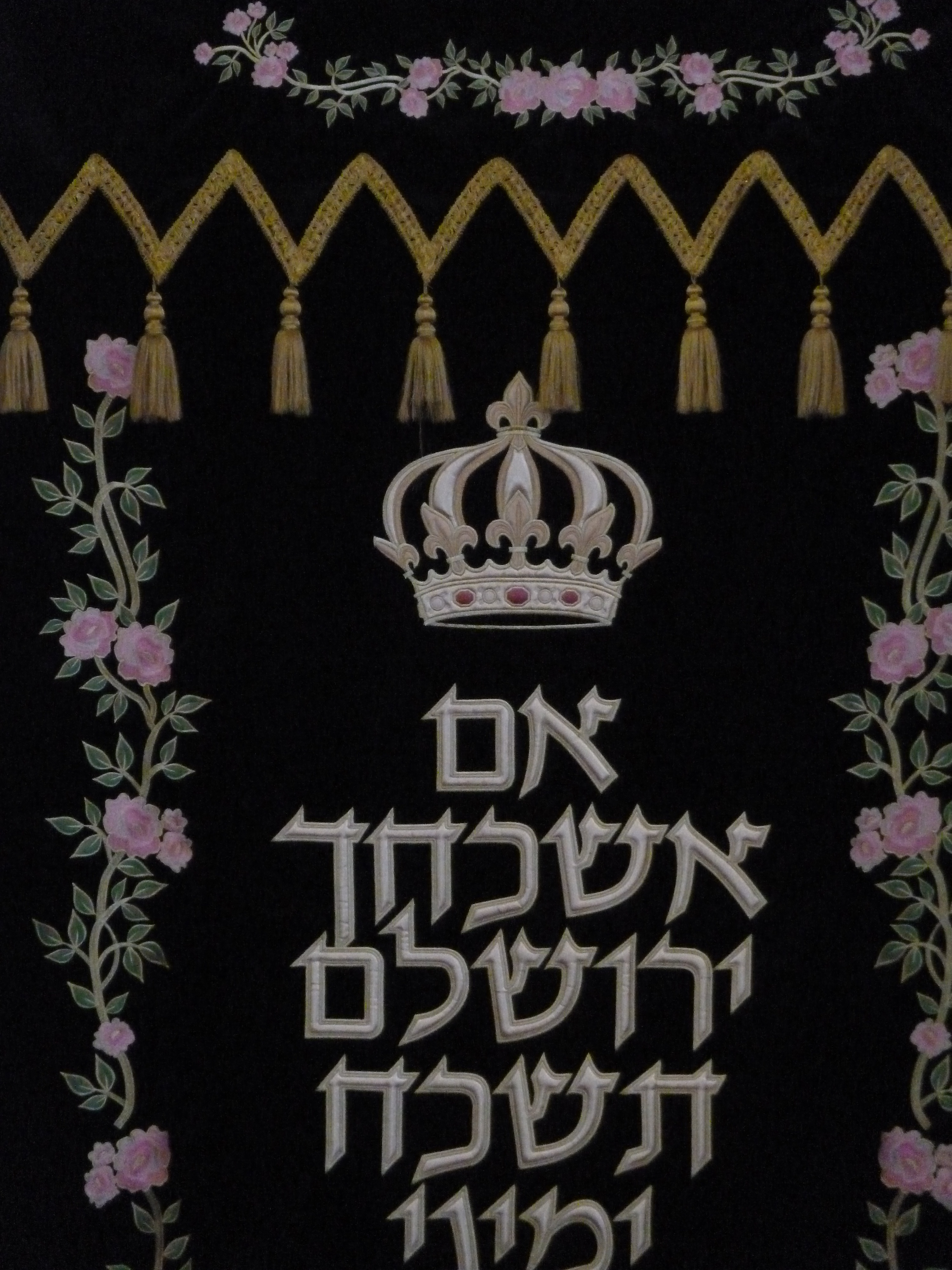
Parochet in the Hurva Synagogue in Jerusalem

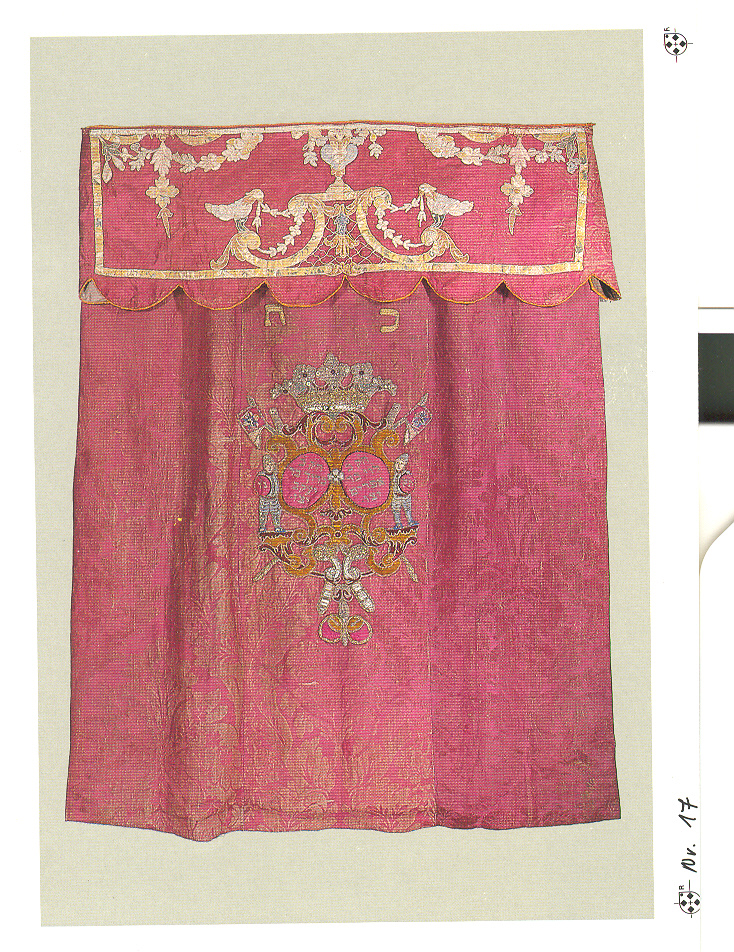
Parochet from 1797, Jewish Museum of Switzerland.

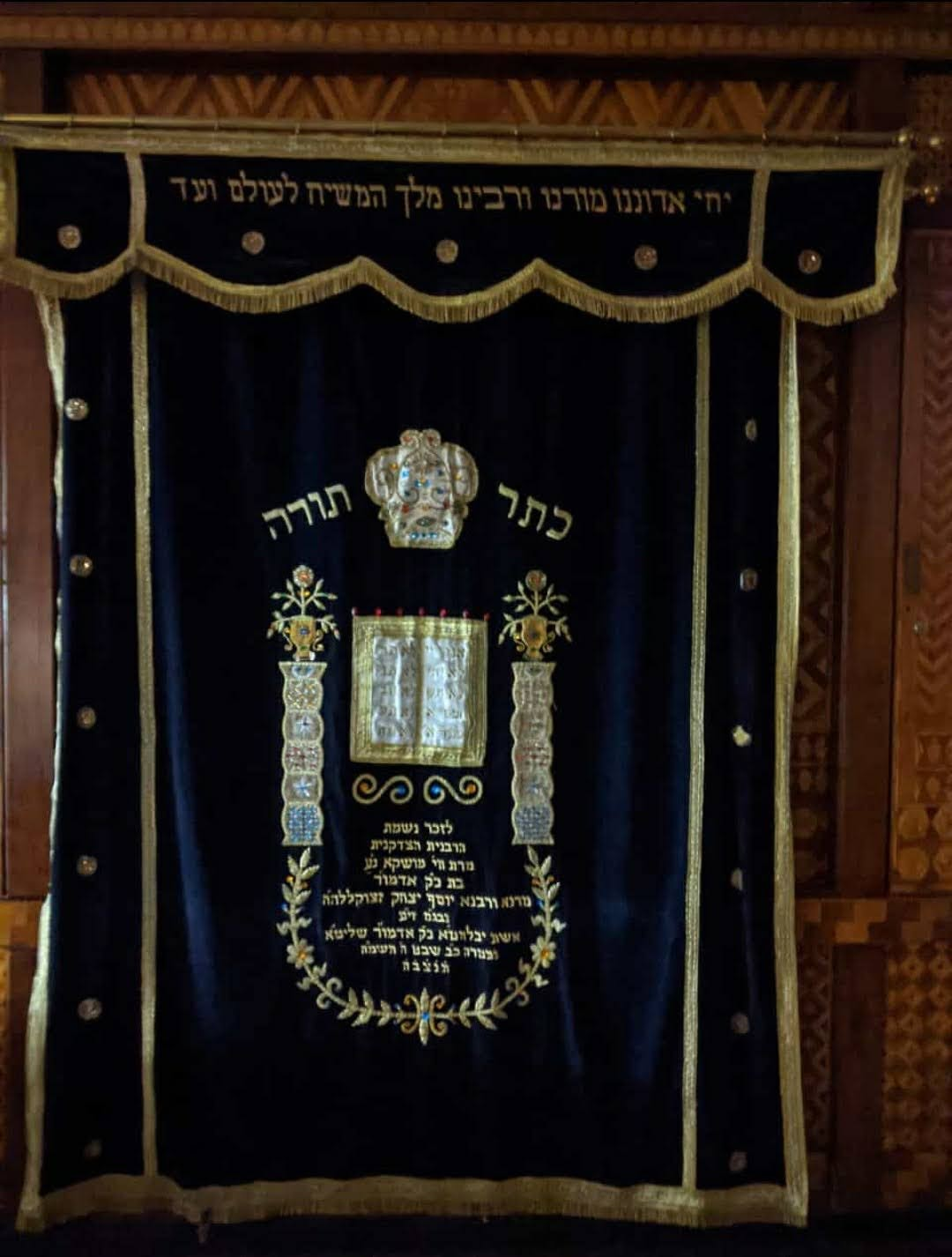
Parochet in the synagogue at 770 Eastern Parkway

== See also ==
- Holy of Holies, inner sanctuary of the Temple in Jerusalem, separated from the Holy by a curtain (parochet)
  - Crucifixion of Jesus - at the death of Jesus, the curtain of the Temple (Gr. katapetasma; the parochet) is torn in two.
