= Krępiec =

Krępiec may refer to:

- Krępiec, Lublin Voivodeship, a village in Poland
- Krępiec, Pomeranian Voivodeship, a village in Poland
- Krępiec (Włodzickie Hills), a mountain in Lower Silesian Voivodeship, Poland
- Krępiec (river), a tributary of the Krypianka in Poland

== See also ==
- Nowy Krępiec, a village in Lublin Voivodeship, Poland
