= Elaine Koppelman =

American mathematician (1937–2019)

- Born: March 28, 1937; Brooklyn, New York, U.S.
- Died: January 11, 2019 (aged 81)
- Education: Brooklyn College (BA); Yale University (MA, ABD); Johns Hopkins University (PhD, MSE)
- Spouse: Hans P. Eugster
- Children: 3 stepdaughters
- Scientific career
- Workplaces: Goucher College
- Thesis: Calculus of operations: French influence on British mathematics in the first half of the nineteenth century (1969)
- Doctoral advisor: Harry Woolf
- Other academic advisors: Carl Benjamin Boyer

Elaine H. Koppelman Eugster (March 28, 1937 – January 11, 2019) was an American mathematician. She was the James Beall Professor of Mathematics at Goucher College.

== Early life and education ==
Koppelman was born on March 28, 1937, in Brooklyn, New York. She had two brothers. At the age of 16, Koppelman graduated from high school. She earned a bachelor's degree in mathematics with a minor in physics from Brooklyn College. Koppelman completed a Master of Arts and an all but dissertation in mathematics at Yale University. For two years, she conducted doctoral research on a mathematical problem before uncovering that an obscure mathematics journal in Poland had already published the solution.

== Career and education ==
In 1961, Koppelman was hired as a teacher at Goucher College with the contingency that she complete her thesis. She attempted to do so for 2 years before giving up. At the suggestion of her husband Hans P. Eugster, Koppelman completed a doctorate in the history of science at Johns Hopkins University in 1969. Her dissertation was titled Calculus of operations: French influence on British mathematics in the first half of the nineteenth century. Koppelman completed the dissertation with her doctoral advisor was Harry Woolf and Carl Benjamin Boyer of Brooklyn College. Koppelman was the James Beall Professor of Mathematics at Goucher College. In 1987, she earned a master's degree in electrical engineering and computer science from Johns Hopkins University. She worked as a field assistant for her husband who was a geologist which took her around the globe. After Eugster's death in 1987, Koppelman volunteered for the Peace Corps and taught data processing in Seychelles. She returned to Goucher where she retired in 2001.

== Personal life ==
Koppelman was married to geologist Hans P. Eugster. They resided in Maryland and purchased a home in Martha's Vineyard in 1984. Eugster died suddenly in 1987. She established the Hans Eugster Research Fund at Johns Hopkins University. Koppelman served on the board or as a volunteer and patron at Martha's Vineyard Cancer Support Group, Hospice of Martha's Vineyard, Friends of the Vineyard Haven Library, the Committee on Hunger, Martha's Vineyard Chamber Music Society, Polly Hill Arboretum, Vineyard Playhouse, and the Yard. Koppelman died on January 11, 2019. She was survived by 3 stepdaughters and 7 step-grandchildren. A memorial service was held in Martha's Vineyard Hebrew Center.

== See also ==
- List of women in mathematics
- Timeline of women in mathematics in the United States
