= Niggli =

Niggli is an Italian surname that may refer to

- Josefina Niggli (1910–1983), Mexican-born Anglo-American playwright and novelist
- Paul Niggli (1888–1953), Swiss crystallographer
  - Dorsum Niggli, a wrinkle ridge on the Moon
  - Niggli Nunataks, is a group of glacial islands in Antarctica
- Simone Niggli-Luder (born 1978), Swiss orienteering athlete
- Urs Niggli (born 1953), Swiss agronomist
