= Żurawniki =

Żurawniki may refer to the following places:

- Żurawniki, Lublin Voivodeship (east Poland)
- Żurawniki, Opatów County in Świętokrzyskie Voivodeship (south-central Poland)
- Żurawniki, Pińczów County in Świętokrzyskie Voivodeship (south-central Poland)
