= Franciszków =

Franciszków may refer to the following places:

- Franciszków, Kutno County in Łódź Voivodeship (central Poland)
- Franciszków, Krasnystaw County in Lublin Voivodeship (east Poland)
- Franciszków, Lublin County in Lublin Voivodeship (east Poland)
- Franciszków, Pabianice County in Łódź Voivodeship (central Poland)
- Franciszków, Skierniewice County in Łódź Voivodeship (central Poland)
- Franciszków, Świdnik County in Lublin Voivodeship (east Poland)
- Franciszków, Gmina Chynów in Masovian Voivodeship (east-central Poland)
- Franciszków, Gmina Jasieniec in Masovian Voivodeship (east-central Poland)
- Franciszków, Radom County in Masovian Voivodeship (east-central Poland)
- Franciszków, Wołomin County in Masovian Voivodeship (east-central Poland)
- Franciszków, Żyrardów County in Masovian Voivodeship (east-central Poland)
