= Minkowice =

Minkowice may refer to the following places in Poland:

- Minkowice, Lublin Voivodeship
- Minkowice, Pomeranian Voivodeship
- Minkowice-Kolonia
- Minkowice Oławskie
