= Salvatore Torquato =

American theoretical scientist

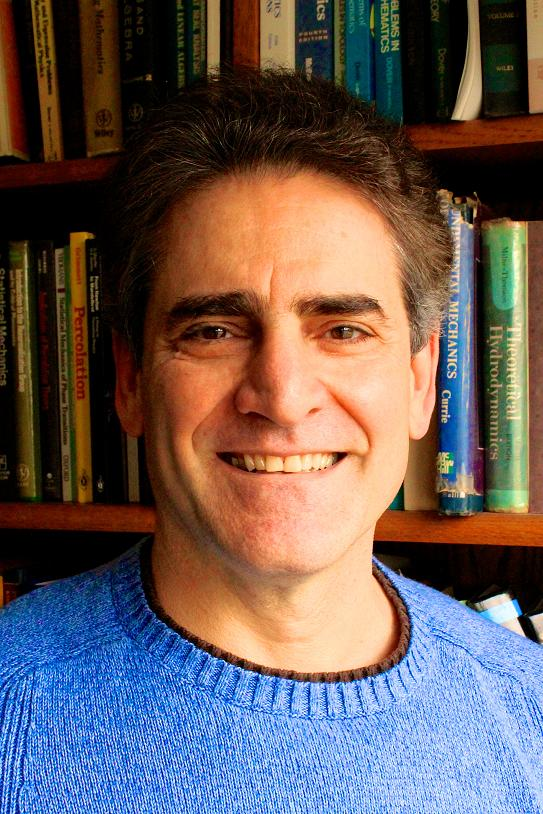
- Born: Salvatore; Falerna, Italy
- Education: Syracuse University (B.S.); SUNY at Stony Brook (M.A., Ph.D)
- Known for: Random heterogeneous material theory; Spatial correlation functions; Microstructure reconstruction; Packing theory; Inverse statistical mechanics; Targeted self-assembly; Hyperuniformity; Cancer modeling
- Awards: Fellow, American Society of Mechanical Engineers (1993); Am. Soc. Mechanical Engineers Gustus L. Larson Memorial Award (1994); Guggenheim Fellowship (1998); Am. Soc. Mechanical Engineers Charles Russ Richards Memorial Award (2002); Society of Engineering Science William Prager Medal (2004); Society for Industrial & Applied Mathematics Ralph E. Kleinman Prize (2007); American Physical Society, David Adler Lectureship Award in Material Physics (2009); Simons Foundation Fellowship in Theoretical Physics (2012); American Chemical Society Joel Hildebrand Award in Theoretical Chemistry of Liquids (2017)
- Scientific career
- Fields: statistical mechanics condensed matter physics materials science applied mathematics biophysics
- Workplaces: Princeton University; Syracuse University; SUNY at Stony Brook; NC State; Institute for Advanced Study
- Doctoral advisor: George Stell
- Website: torquato.princeton.edu

Salvatore Torquato is an American theoretical scientist born in Falerna, Italy. His research work has impacted a variety of fields, including physics, chemistry, applied and pure mathematics, materials science, engineering, and biological physics. He is the Lewis Bernard Professor of Natural Sciences in the department of chemistry and Princeton Institute for the Science and Technology of Materials at Princeton University. He has been a senior faculty fellow in the Princeton Center for Theoretical Science, an enterprise dedicated to exploring frontiers across the theoretical natural sciences. He is also an associated faculty member in three departments or programs at Princeton University: physics, applied and computational mathematics, and mechanical and aerospace engineering. On multiple occasions, he was a member of the schools of mathematics and natural sciences at the Institute for Advanced Study, Princeton, New Jersey.

== Research accomplishments ==
Torquato's research work is centered in statistical mechanics and soft condensed matter theory. The impact of his work has also extended into the biological sciences, discrete geometry, and number theory. As of Oct. 2024, his published work has been cited over 55,870 times and his h-index is 122.

Torquato has identified sensitive order metrics pertaining to the randomness of condensed phases of matter. He is also an expert on packing problems, including pioneering the notion of the "maximally random jammed" state of particle packings, identifying a Kepler-like conjecture for the densest packings of nonspherical particles, and providing strong theoretical evidence that the densest sphere packings in high dimensions (a problem of importance in digital communications) are counterintuitively disordered, not ordered as in our three-dimensional world. He has devised the premier algorithm to reconstruct microstructures of random media. Torquato formulated the first comprehensive cellular automaton model of cancer growth. He has made contributions to the study of random heterogeneous materials, including writing the treatise on this subject called "Random Heterogeneous Materials." He also works on "materials by design" using optimization techniques, including "inverse" statistical mechanics. In 2003, he introduced a new exotic state of matter called "disordered hyperuniformity", which is intermediate between a crystal and liquid. These states of matter are endowed with novel physical properties. A study in 2019 has uncovered that the prime numbers in certain large intervals possess unanticipated order across length scales and represent the first example of a new class of many-particle systems with pure point diffraction patterns, which are called effectively limit-periodic.

=== Random heterogeneous media ===
The work on the theory of random heterogeneous media dates back to the work of James Clerk Maxwell, Lord Rayleigh and Einstein, and has important ramifications in the physical and biological sciences. Random media abound in nature and synthetic situations, and include composites, thin films, colloids, packed beds, foams, microemulsions, blood, bone, animal and plant tissue, sintered materials, and sandstones. The effective transport, mechanical and electromagnetic properties are determined by the ensemble-averaged fields that satisfy the governing partial differential equations. Thus, they depend, in a complex manner, upon the random microstructure of the material via correlation functions, including those that characterize clustering and percolation.

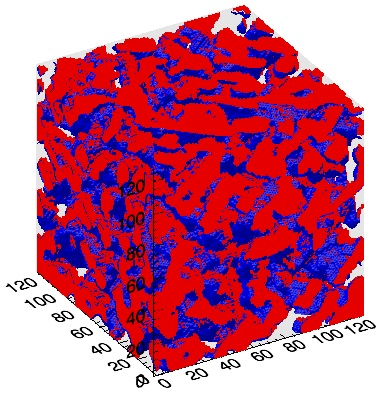
A 3D realization of binary Pb-Sn alloy obtained using the Yeong-Torquato reconstruction algorithm.

In 1990s, progress in predicting the effective properties had been hampered because of the difficulty involved in characterizing the random microstructures. To resolve this problem, Torquato created a rigorous categorization system of the microstructures and macroscopic properties of widely diverse random heterogeneous media, and his treatise on the matter has been cited over 5,300 times. In an article published in Physical Review X in 2021, Torquato and Jaeuk Kim formulated the first "nonlocal" exact formula for the effective dynamic dielectric constant tensor for general composite microstructures that accounts for multiple scattering of electromagnetic waves to all orders.

In 1997, Ole Sigmund and Torquato wrote a paper on the use of the topology optimization method to design metamaterials with negative thermal expansion or those with zero thermal expansion. They also designed 3D anisotropic porous solids with negative Poisson's ratio to optimize the performance of piezoelectric composites. Torquato and coworkers were the first to show that composites whose interfaces are triply periodic minimal surfaces are optimal for multifunctionality.

Torquato and colleagues created an inverse optimization procedure to reconstruct or construct realizations of disordered many-particle or two-phase systems from lower-order correlation functions. This proved that pair information of a disordered many-particle system is insufficient to uniquely determine a representative configuration and identified more sensitive structural descriptors beyond the standard three-, four-body distribution functions, which is relevant in the study of liquid and glassy states of matter.

In 1986, Torquato formulated a unified theoretical approach to represent exactly a general n-point "canonical" correlation function H_{n} from which one can obtain and compute any of the various types of correlation functions that determine the bulk properties of liquids, glasses and random media, as well as the generalizations of these correlation functions. The wealth of structural information contained in H_{n} is far from understood. More recently, Torquato and colleagues are discovering connections of special cases of the H_{n} to the covering and quantizer problems of discrete geometry as well as to problems in number theory.

=== Liquids and glasses ===
Torquato is an expert in the statistical-mechanical theory of liquid and glassy states of matter. He contributed to the understanding of the venerable hard-sphere model, which has been invoked to study local molecular order, transport phenomena, glass formation, and freezing behavior in liquids. He also did research concerning the theory of water, simple liquids, and general statistical-mechanical theory of condensed states of matter. He has also worked on identifying and applying sensitive correlation functions and descriptors to characterize liquid and glassy structures beyond standard pair statistics. He has also characterized the structure of random media within liquid-state theory.

Torquato and colleagues developed the concept of "order metrics and maps" to characterize the degree of order/disorder in many-particle systems. Such descriptors were initially applied to suggest an alternative to the ill-defined random close packed state of sphere packings. Order metrics have been employed by many investigators to characterize the degree of disorder in simple liquids, water and structural glasses. Torquato along with his co-workers have used order metrics to provide novel insights into the structural, thermodynamical, and dynamical nature of molecular systems, such as Lennard-Jones liquids and glasses, water and disordered ground states of matter, among other examples.

Torquato and Stillinger discovered g_{2}-invariant processes in which a given nonnegative pair correlation g_{2} function remains invariant over the range of densities 0≤ø≤ø*, where ø* is the maximum achievable density subject to satisfaction of certain necessary conditions on g_{2}.

During the 2000s, Torquato and his collaborators used inverse statistical-mechanical methodologies to find optimized interaction potentials that lead spontaneously and robustly to a target many-particle configuration, including nanoscale structures, at zero temperature (ground states) and positive temperatures (excited states). Target structures included low coordinated 2D and 3D crystal ground states, disordered ground states as well as atomic systems with negative Poisson's ratios over a wide range of temperatures and densities.

In 2013, Marcotte, Stillinger and Torquato demonstrated that a sensitive signature of the glass transition of atomic liquid models is apparent well before the transition temperature T_{c} is reached upon supercooling as measured by a length scale determined from the volume integral of the direct correlation function c(r), as defined by the Ornstein-Zernike equation. This length scale grows appreciably with decreasing temperature.

Perfect glasses

In a paper published in 2016, Zheng, Stillinger and Torquato introduced the notion of a "perfect glass". Such amorphous solids involve many-body interactions that eliminate the possibilities of crystalline and quasicrystalline phases for any state variables, while creating mechanically stable amorphous glasses that are hyperuniform down to absolute zero temperature. Subsequently, it was shown computationally that perfect glasses possess unique disordered classical ground states up to trivial symmetries and hence have vanishing entropy. This discovery provides singular examples in which entropy and disorder are at odds with one another.

=== Packing problems ===
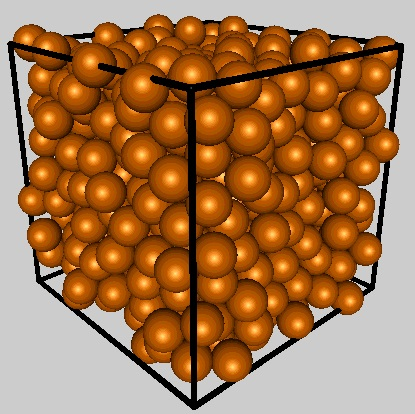
A realization of the maximally random jammed packing in 3D Euclidean space with periodic boundary conditions

Torquato is an expert on packing problems, such as how densely or randomly nonoverlapping particles can fill a volume. Packing problems are intimately related to condensed phases of matter, including classical ground states, liquids, crystals and glasses. While the preponderance of work before 2000 considered sphere packings, Torquato and his colleagues were early adopters of the study of the densest and disordered jammed packings of nonspherical particles (e.g., ellipsoids, polyhedra, superballs, among other shapes). Since 2000, nonspherical packings have become a more popular object of study

In a paper published in Physical Review Letters in 2000, Torquato together with Thomas Truskett and Pablo Debenedetti demonstrated that the venerable notion of random close packing in sphere packings is mathematically ill-defined and replaced it with a new concept called the maximally random jammed state. This was made possible by using scalar metrics of order (or disorder) and introducing mathematically precise jamming categories. MRJ packings have come to be viewed as prototypical glasses because they are maximally disordered (according to different order metrics) and infinitely mechanically rigid. Michael Klatt and Torquato characterized various correlation functions as well as transport and electromagnetic properties of MRJ sphere packings.

In a paper published in the PNAS in 2006, John Conway and Torquato analytically constructed packings of tetrahedra that doubled the density of the best known packings at that time. In a paper published in Nature in 2009, Torquato and Jiao determined the densest known packings of the non-tiling Platonic solids (tetrahedra, octahedron, icosahedron and dodecahedron) as well as the thirteen Archimedean solids. The Torquato-Jiao conjecture states that the densest packings of the Platonic and Archimedean solids with central symmetry (which constitute the majority of them) are given by their corresponding densest Bravais lattice packings. They also conjectured that the optimal packing of any convex, identical polyhedron without central symmetry generally is not a Bravais lattice packing. To date, there are no counterexamples to these conjectures, which are based on certain theoretical considerations. Torquato's work on polyhedra spurred a flurry of activity in the physics and mathematics communities to determine the densest possible packings of such solids.

Torquato and Stillinger derived a conjectural lower bound on the maximal density of sphere packings in arbitrary Euclidean space dimension d whose large-d asymptotic behavior is controlled by 2^{-(0:77865...)d}. This work may provide the putative exponential improvement on Minkowski's 100-year-old bound for Bravais lattices, the dominant asymptotic term of which is 1/2^{d}. These results suggest that the densest packings in sufficiently high dimensions may be disordered rather than periodic, implying the existence of disordered classical ground states for some continuous potentials – a counterintuitive and profound result.

Donev, Stillinger and Torquato formulated a collision-driven molecular dynamics algorithm to create dense packings of smoothy shaped non-spherical particles, within a parallelepiped simulation domain, under both periodic or hard-wall boundary conditions. Torquato and Jiao devised the so-called adaptative-shrinking-cell optimization scheme to generate dense packings of ordered and disordered spheres across dimensions using linear programming as well as dense packings of ordered and disordered nonspherical particles (including polyhedra) via Monte Carlo methods.

=== Hyperuniformity ===
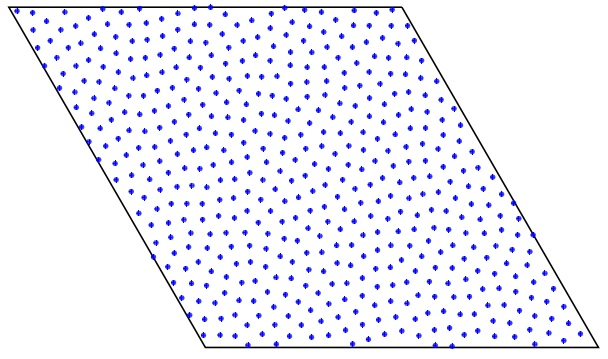
A realization of stealthy hyperuniform point configuration

In an article published in 2003, Torquato and Stillinger introduced the "hyperuniformity" concept to characterize the large-scale density fluctuations of ordered and disordered point configurations. A hyperuniform many-particle system in d-dimensional Euclidean space R^{d} is characterized by an anomalous suppression of large-scale density fluctuations relative to those in typical disordered systems, such as liquids and amorphous solids. As such, the hyperuniformity concept generalizes the traditional notion of long-range order to include not only all perfect crystals and quasicrystals, but also exotic disordered states of matter, which have the character of crystals on large length scales but are isotropic like liquids.

Disordered hyperuniform systems and their manifestations were largely unknown in the scientific community about two decades ago. Now there is a realization that these systems play a vital role in a number of problems across the physical, materials, mathematical, and biological sciences. Torquato and co-workers have contributed to these developments by showing that these exotic states of matter can be obtained via both equilibrium and nonequilibrium routes and come in both quantum mechanical and classical varieties. The study of hyperuniform states of matter is a multidisciplinary field, influencing and linking developments across the physical sciences, mathematics and biology. In particular, the hybrid crystal-liquid attribute of disordered hyperuniform materials endows them with unique or nearly optimal, direction-independent physical properties and robustness against defects, which makes them a common subject of research.

Torquato generalized the hyperuniformity concept to heterogeneous media. More recently, Torquato extended hyperuniformity to encompass scalar random fields (e.g., concentration and temperature fields, spinodal decomposition), vector fields (e.g., turbulent velocity fields) and statistically anisotropic many-particle systems. This study led to the idea of "directional hyperuniformity" in reciprocal space. Torquato, Robert Distasio, Roberto Car and colleagues have generalized the hyperuniformity idea to spin systems. Recently, Duyu Chen and Torquato formulated a Fourier space-based optimization approach to construct, at will, two-phase hyperuniform media with prescribed spectral densities. To more completely characterize density fluctuations of point configurations, Torquato, Kim and Klatt carried out a theoretical and computational study of the higher-order moments or cumulants, including the skewness, excess kurtosis, and the corresponding probability distribution function of a large family of models across the first three space dimensions, including both hyperuniform and nonhyperuniform systems with varying degrees of short- and long-range order, and determined when a central limit theorem was achieved.

Torquato, together Antonello Scardicchio, has rigorously shown the certain ground states of fermionic systems in any space dimension d are disordered and hyperuniform. Daniel Abreu, Torquato and colleagues proved that Weyl–Heisenberg ensembles are hyperuniform. Such ensembles include as a special case a multi-layer extension of the Ginibre ensemble modeling the distribution of electrons in higher Landau levels, which is responsible for the quantum Hall effect. More recently, it was shown that there are quantum phase transitions in long-range interacting hyperuniform spin chains in a transverse field.

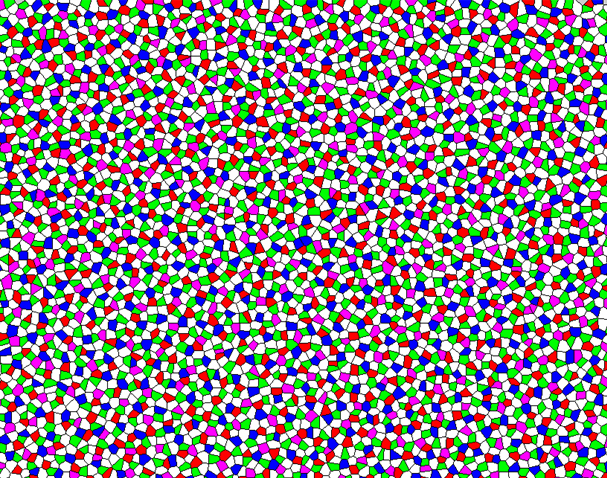
Hyperuniform patterns of avian photoreceptors in chicken retina

Jiao, Torquato, Joseph Corbo and colleagues presented the first example of disordered hyperuniformity found in biology, namely, photoreceptor cells in avian retina. Birds are highly visual animals with five different cone photoreceptor subtypes, yet their photoreceptor patterns are irregular, which less than ideal to sample light. By analyzing chicken cone photoreceptors, consisting of five different cell types, it was found that the disordered patterns are hyperuniform, but with a twist - both the total population and the individual cell types are simultaneously hyperuniform. This multihyperuniformity property is crucial for the acute color vision possessed by birds. Elsewhere, Lomba, Torquato and co-workers presented the first statistical-mechanical model that rigorously achieves disordered multihyperuniformity in ternary mixtures to sample the three primary colors: red, blue and green.

Torquato, Stillinger and colleagues created the collective-coordinate numerical optimization approach to generate systems of particles interacting with isotropic "stealthy" bounded long-ranged pair potentials (similar to Friedel oscillations) whose classical ground states are counterintuitively disordered, hyperuniform, and highly degenerate across space dimensions. "Stealthy" means that there is zero scattering for a range of wavevectors around the origin. A singular feature of such systems is that dimensionality of the configuration space depends on the fraction of such constrained wave vectors compared to the number of degrees of freedom.

About a decade ago, it was believed that photonic crystals (dielectric networks with crystal symmetries) were required to achieve large complete (both polarizations and all directions) photonic band gaps. Such materials can be thought of a omnidirectional mirrors but for a finite range of frequencies. By mapping the aforementioned "stealthy" disordered ground-state particle configurations to corresponding dielectric networks, Marain Florescu, Paul Steinhardt and Torquato discovered the first disordered network solids with complete photonic band gaps comparable in size to photonic crystals but with the added advantage that the band gaps are completely isotropic. It was shown both theoretically and experimentally that the latter property enables one to design free-form waveguides not possible with crystals.

Zhang, Stillinger and Torquato showed that stealthy disordered two-phase systems can attain nearly maximal effective diffusion coefficients over a broad range of volume fractions while also maintaining isotropy. Torquato and Chen discovered that the effective thermal (or electrical) conductivities and elastic moduli of 2D disordered hyperuniform low-density cellular networks are optimal under the constraint of statistical isotropy. Elsewhere, Torquato found that hyperuniform porous media possess singular fluid flow characteristics.

Kim and Torquato demonstrated that stealthy disordered two-phase systems can be made to be perfectly transparent to both elastic and electromagnetic waves for a wide range of incident frequencies.

Recently, Torquato and co-workers have formulated protocols to create and synthesize large hyperuniform samples that are effectively hyperuniform down to the nanoscale. Kim and Torquato formulated a new tessellation-based computational procedure to design extremely large perfectly hyperuniform disordered dispersions (more than 108 particles) for materials discovery via 3D printing techniques. Self-assembly techniques offer a path to fabricate large samples at much smaller length scales. More recently, Ma, Lomba and Torquato a feasible experimental protocol to create very large hyperuniform systems was proposed using binary paramagnetic colloidal particles. The strong and long-ranged dipolar interaction induced by a tunable magnetic field is free from screening effects that attenuate long-ranged electrostatic interactions in charged colloidal systems.

Zachary and Torquato computed the hyperuniformity order metric, derived from the asymptotic number variance, for first time for quasicrystals: 1D Fibonacci chain and 2D Penrose tiling. The characterization of the hyperuniformity of quasicrystals via the structure factor S(k) is considerably more subtle than that for crystals because the former are characterized by a dense set of Bragg peaks. To do so, Erdal Oguz, Joshua Socolar, Steinhardt and Torquato employed the integrated structure factor to ascertain the hyperuniformity of quasicrystals. The same authors demonstrated elsewhere that certain one-dimensional substitution tilings can either be hyperuniform or anti-hyperuniform. Cheney Lin, Steinhardt and Torquato determined how the hyperuniformity metric in quasicrystals depends on the local isomorphism class.

Torquato, together with Matthew De Courcy-Ireland and Zhang, discovered that the prime numbers in a distinguished limit are hyperuniform with dense Bragg peaks (like a quasicrystal) but positioned at certain rational wavenumbers, like a limit-periodic point pattern, but with an "erratic" pattern of occupied and unoccupied sites. The discovery of this hidden multiscale order in the primes is in contradistinction to their traditional treatment as pseudo-random numbers.

== Honors and awards ==
Torquato is a member of American Academy of Sciences and Letters, a fellow of the American Physical Society, fellow of the Society for Industrial and Applied Mathematics (SIAM) and Fellow of the American Society of Mechanical Engineers. He is the recipient of the 2017 ASC Joel Henry Hildebrand Award, the 2009 APS David Adler Lectureship Award in Material Physics, SIAM Ralph E. Kleinman Prize, Society of Engineering Science William Prager Medal and ASME Richards Memorial Award. He was a Guggenheim Fellow. He has been a Member of the Institute for Advanced Study on four separate occasions. He recently received a Simons Foundation Fellowship in Theoretical Physics.

== Selected publications ==
- Torquato, S.; Lu, B.; Rubinstein, J. (1990). "Nearest-Neighbor Distribution Functions in Many-Body Systems". Physical Review A. 41 (4): 2059–2075. Bibcode:1990PhRvA..41.2059T. doi:10.1103/physreva.41.2059. PMID 9903316.
- Sigmund, O.; Torquato, S. (1997). "Design of Materials with Extreme Thermal Expansion using a Three-Phase Topology Optimization Method". Journal of the Mechanics and Physics of Solids. 45 (6): 1037. Bibcode:1997JMPSo..45.1037S. doi:10.1016/S0022-5096(96)00114-7.
- Yeong, C. L. Y.; Torquato, S. (1998). "Reconstructing Random Media". Physical Review E. 57 (1): 495. Bibcode:1998PhRvE..57..495Y. doi:10.1103/physreve.57.495.
- Kansal, A. R.; Torquato, S.; Harsh, G. R.; Chiocca, E. A.; Deisboeck, T. S. (2000). "Simulated Brain Tumor Growth using a Three-Dimensional Cellular Automaton". Journal of Theoretical Biology. 203 (4): 367–82. doi:10.1006/jtbi.2000.2000. PMID 10736214.
- Torquato, S.; Truskett, T. M.; Debenedetti, P. G. (2000). "Is Random Close Packing of Spheres Well Defined?". Physical Review Letters. 84 (10): 2064–2067. arXiv:cond-mat/0003416. Bibcode:2000PhRvL..84.2064T. doi:10.1103/physrevlett.84.2064. PMID 11017210. S2CID 13149645.
- Torquato, S. (2002). Random Heterogeneous Materials: Microstructure and Macroscopic Properties. New-York: Springer-Verlag.
- Torquato, S.; Stillinger, F. H. (2003). "Local Density Fluctualtions, Hyperuniform Systems, and Order Metrics". Physical Review E. 68 (6): 041113. Bibcode:2003PhRvE..68f9901T. doi:10.1103/physreve.68.069901.
- Donev, A.; Cisse, I.; Sachs, D.; Variano, E. A.; Stillinger, F. H.; Connelly, R.; Torquato, S.; Chaikin, P. M. (2004). "Improving the Density of Jammed Disordered Packings using Ellipsoids". Science. 303 (5660): 990–993. Bibcode:2004Sci...303..990D. doi:10.1126/science.1093010. PMID 14963324. S2CID 33409855.
- Torquato, S.; Stillinger, F. H. (2006). "New Conjectural Lower Bounds on the Optimal Density of Sphere Packings". Experimental Mathematics. 15 (3): 307. arXiv:math/0508381. doi:10.1080/10586458.2006.10128964. S2CID 9921359.
- Torquato, S.; Jiao, Y. (2009). "Dense Packings of the Platonic and Archimedean Solids". Nature. 460 (7257): 876–9. arXiv:0908.4107. Bibcode:2009Natur.460..876T. doi:10.1038/nature08239. PMID 19675649. S2CID 52819935.
- Torquato, S. (2009). "Inverse Optimization Techniques for Targeted Self-Assembly". Soft Matter. 5 (6): 1157. arXiv:0811.0040. Bibcode:2009SMat....5.1157T. doi:10.1039/b814211b. S2CID 9709789.
- Florescu, M.; Torquato, S.; Steinhardt, P. J. (2009). "Designer Disordered Materials with Large, Complete Photonic Band Gaps". Proceedings of the National Academy of Sciences. 106 (49): 20658–63. arXiv:1007.3554. Bibcode:2009PNAS..10620658F. doi:10.1073/pnas.0907744106. PMC 2777962. PMID 19918087.
- Marcotte, É.; Stillinger, F. H.; Torquato, S. (2013). "Nonequilibrium Static Growing Length Scales in Supercooled Liquids on Approaching the Glass Transition". Journal of Chemical Physics. 138 (12): 12A508. arXiv:1210.0245. Bibcode:2013JChPh.138lA508M. doi:10.1063/1.4769422. PMID 23556759. S2CID 1807776.
- Jiao, Y.; Lau, T.; Haztzikirou, H.; Meyer-Hermann, M.; Corbo, J. C.; Torquato, S. (2014). "Avian Photoreceptor Patterns Represent a Disordered Hyperuniform Solution to a Multiscale Packing Problem". Physical Review E. 89 (2) 022721. arXiv:1402.6058. Bibcode:2014PhRvE..89b2721J. doi:10.1103/physreve.89.022721. PMC 5836809. PMID 25353522.
- Torquato, S.; Zhang, G.; Stillinger, F. H. (2015). "Ensemble Theory for Stealthy Hyperuniform Disordered Ground States". Physical Review X. 5 (2) 021020. arXiv:1503.06436. Bibcode:2015PhRvX...5b1020T. doi:10.1103/physrevx.5.021020. S2CID 17275490.
- Torquato, S. (2016). "Hyperuniformity and its Generalizations". Physical Review E. 94 (2) 022122. arXiv:1607.08814. Bibcode:2016PhRvE..94b2122T. doi:10.1103/PhysRevE.94.022122. PMID 27627261. S2CID 30459937.
- Torquato, S. (2018). "Hyperuniform States of Matter". Physics Reports. 745: 1. arXiv:1801.06924. Bibcode:2018PhR...745....1T. doi:10.1016/j.physrep.2018.03.001. S2CID 119378373.
- Torquato, S. (2018). "Perspective: Basic Understanding of Condensed Phases of Matter via Packing Models". The Journal of Chemical Physics. 149 (2) 020901. arXiv:1805.04468. Bibcode:2018JChPh.149b0901T. doi:10.1063/1.5036657. PMID 30007388. S2CID 51637754.
- Torquato, S.; Zhang, G.; de Courcy-Ireland, M. (2018). "Uncovering Multiscale Order in the Prime Numbers via Scattering". Journal of Statistical Mechanics: Theory and Experiment. 2018 (9): 093401. arXiv:1802.10498. Bibcode:2018JSMTE..09.3401T. doi:10.1088/1742-5468/aad6be. S2CID 85513257.
- M. A. Klatt, P. J. Steinhardt, and S. Torquato, Phoamtonic Designs Yield Sizeable 3D Photonic Band Gaps, Proceedings of the National Academy of Sciences, 116(47) 23480-23486 (2019).
- G. Zhang and S. Torquato, Realizable Hyperuniform and Nonhyperuniform Particle Configurations with Targeted Spectral Functions via Effective Pair Interactions, Physical Review E, 101 032124 (2020).
- J. Kim and S. Torquato, Multifunctional Composites for Elastic and Electromagnetic Wave Propagation, Proceedings of the National Academy of Sciences of the United States of America, 117(16) 8764-8774 (2020).
- C. E. Maher, F. H. Stillinger, and S. Torquato, Kinetic Frustration Effects on Dense Two-Dimensional Packings of Convex Particles and Their Structural Characteristics, Journal of Physical Chemistry B, 125, 2450 (2021).
- Z. Ma, E. Lomba, and S. Torquato, Optimized Large Hyperuniform Binary Colloidal Suspensions in Two Dimensions, Physical Review Letters, 125 068002 (2020).
- H. Wang, F. H. Stillinger and S. Torquato, Sensitivity of Pair Statistics on Pair Potentials in Many-Body Systems, The Journal of Chemical Physics, 153 124106 (2020).
- A. Bose and S. Torquato, Quantum phase transitions in long-range interacting hyperuniform spin chains in a transverse field, Physical Review B, 103 014118 (2021).
- S. Yu, C. W. Qiu, Y. Chong, S. Torquato, and N. Park, Engineered disorder in photonics, Nature Reviews Materials, 6 226 (2021).
- S. Torquato and J. Kim, Nonlocal Effective Electromagnetic Wave Characteristics of Composite Media: Beyond the Quasistatic Regime, Physical Review X, 11, 021002 (2021).
- S. Torquato, J. Kim, and M. A. Klatt, Local Number Fluctuations in Hyperuniform and Nonhyperuniform Systems: Higher-Order Moments and Distribution Functions, Physical Review X, 11, 021028 (2021).
- S. Torquato, Structural characterization of many-particle systems on approach to hyperuniform states, Physical Review E, 103 052126 (2021).
- M. Skolnick, and S. Torquato, Understanding degeneracy of two-point correlation functions via Debye random media, Physical Review E, 104 045306 (2021).
