= BKZ =

BKZ or bkz may refer to:

- Bahalike railway station (Station code: BKZ), a railway station in Punjab, Pakistan
- Block Korkine-Zolotarev algorithm, the Korkine-Zolotarev lattice reduction algorithm applied to blocks of the lattice base.
- Bukoba Airport (IATA: BKZ), a domestic airport in Bukoba, Kagera Region, Tanzania
- Bungku language (ISO 639-3: bkz), an Austronesian language of Southeast Sulawesi, Indonesia
