= HKZ =

HKZ may refer to:

- HKZ algorithm, lattice reduction algorithm
- Hrvatska kulturna zajednica (Croatian Cultural Community), organization of Croats in Germany
- Herz-Kreislauf-Zentrum (Cardiovascular Centre), building of Rotenburg an der Fulda, Germany
