= Lawrence Alexander Hardie =

American geologist (1933–2013)

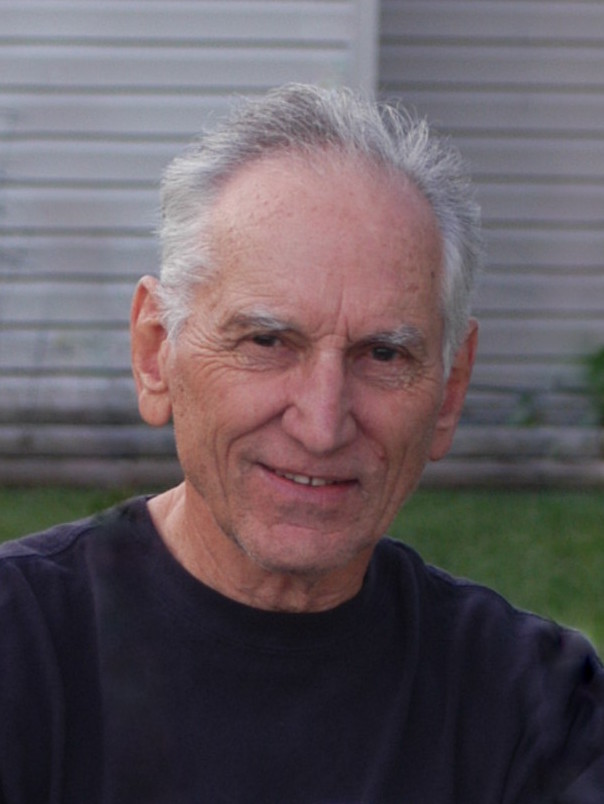
- Lawrence A. Hardie in 2004
- Born: Lawrence Alexander Hardie; January 13, 1933; Durban, Natal, South Africa
- Died: December 17, 2013 (aged 80); Seaside, California, U.S.
- Education: Johns Hopkins University
- Alma mater: University of Natal, RSA; Johns Hopkins University, US (Ph.D.)
- Spouse: Glenys Kathleen Hardie (1961-)
- Children: Deborah Buettner; Russell Hardie
- Awards: Francis J. Pettijohn Medal for Excellence by the Society for Sedimentary Geology in 2003.
- Scientific career
- Fields: Geology, Sedimentology, Geochemistry
- Workplaces: Johns Hopkins University Department of Earth and Planetary Sciences professor 1965–2013, chair 1992–1995, 2004–2006
- Doctoral advisor: Hans P. Eugster; Francis J. Pettijohn

Lawrence Alexander Hardie (January 13, 1933 – December 17, 2013) was an American geologist, sedimentologist, and geochemist.

Hardie was a professor at Johns Hopkins University in the Department of Earth and Planetary Sciences. His research topics included evaporites, dolomitization, cyclical deposition of carbonate sediments, and plate tectonic driven changes in seawater chemistry. In the latter, he proposed that changes in the seafloor spreading rates at mid-ocean ridges have altered the composition of seawater throughout earth history, producing oscillations in the mineralogy of carbonate and evaporite precipitates. Specifically citing these scientific contributions, the Society for Sedimentary Geology (SEPM) awarded him the Francis J. Pettijohn Medal in 2003.

== Early life and education ==
Hardie was born in Durban, Natal, South Africa, on January 13, 1933. He attended the University of Natal, Durban, originally to pursue an undergraduate degree in chemistry. He focused instead on geology after attending lectures by South African geologist Lester Charles King. While a student, Hardie played soccer, and was selected as a member of the South African Universities "All Star" team four times. He earned a B.Sc. degree in Geology and Chemistry in 1955, and a B.Sc. (Hons.)degree in Geology in 1956.

In 1957, he was hired by King as an instructor and taught beginning classes in geology while working on his master's thesis on the origin of the Table Mountain Sandstone. He earned an M.Sc. in geology in 1959 under the guidance of Drs. Peter Matthews and Joseph Frankel.

In 1960, he was awarded a fellowship by the South African Council for Scientific and Industrial Research to spend an academic year in the U.S. He went to Johns Hopkins University and began working with sedimentologist Francis J. Pettijohn and geochemist Hans Eugster, in a newly built geochemistry laboratory. There he conducted experimental work on evaporite minerals. He was offered a full-time graduate fellowship to earn a Ph.D. He briefly returned to South Africa to marry Glenys Kathleen Smith in Durban, and then graduated with a Ph.D. in 1965.

== Academic career ==
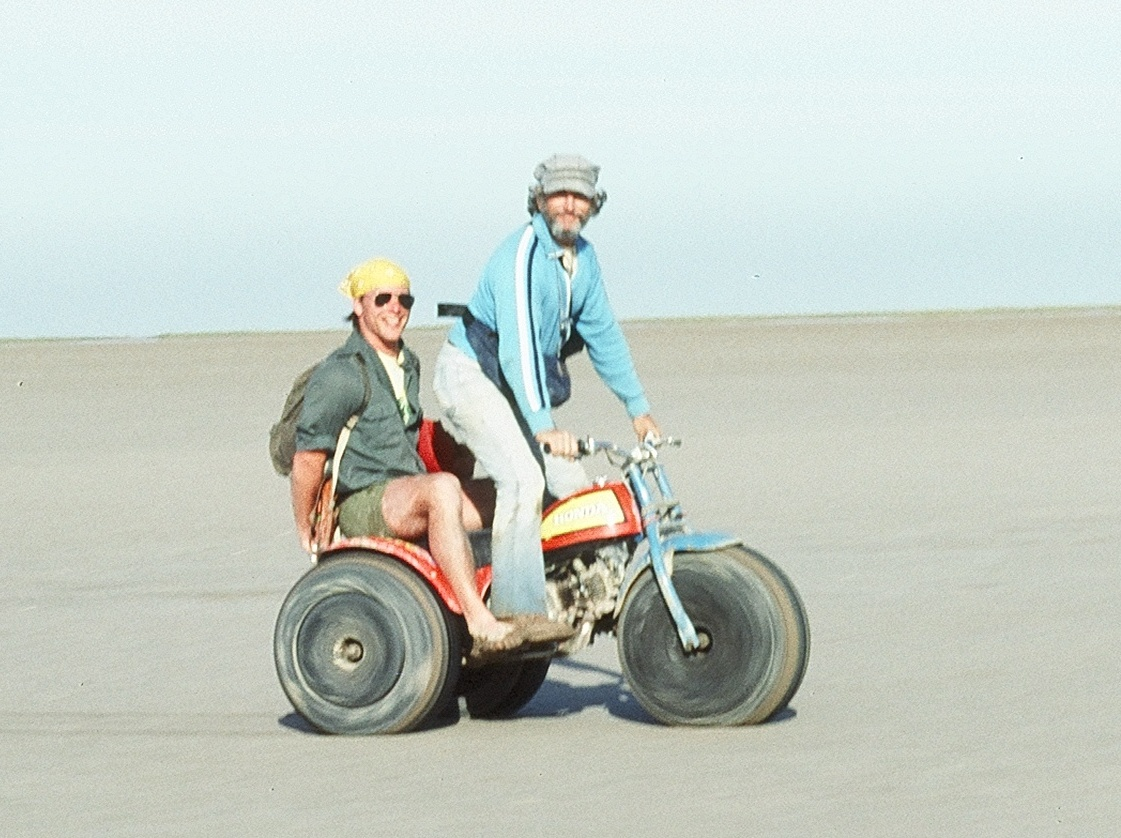
Lawrence A. Hardie driving Honda All Terrain Vehicle in Baja California, Mexico during a geology field trip in the early 1980s. Photo by R. C. Hardie.

Hardie joined the faculty at JHU as an assistant professor in the Department of Earth and Planetary Sciences in 1965. He later became a full professor, mentoring more than 30 graduate students. He also taught introductory geology to many undergraduate students, including his own children, introducing them to the intricacies of geological process through extensive field trips. He also served as the department chair from 1992 to 1995, and again in 2004–2006. He retired in 2007 to the status of professor emeritus.

Hardie ran the JHU field camp (Camp Singewald) in western Maryland for many summers in the 1960s and 1970s. He led regular field trips to the Florida Keys and Assateague Island, and also took students to the Bahamas and Baja California, Mexico. His work also took him frequently to the Dolomites in Italy, and he partook in long hikes and climbs. Some of his field work required travel by Zodiac inflatable boats, minibikes, and 3-wheeled all-terrain vehicles.

== Scientific achievements ==
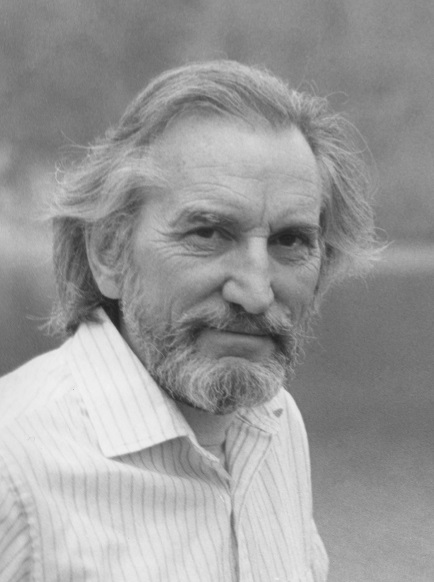
Geologist Lawrence A Hardie, Professor, Johns Hopkins University Photo taken in 1988 by R. C. Hardie.

Early in his career, Hardie conducted research and experimentation with evaporites. Later he showed that the signal from evaporites provides evidence for seawater chemistry change. He observed that secular changes in the mineralogy of potash evaporites and ooids and cements in marine limestones are synchronous with greenhouse/hothouse climates and global sea level. Hardie's study of evaporites led to the hypothesis, since verified through study of seawater trapped inside crystals of marine halite, that seawater has undergone long-term variations in its major ion composition. He demonstrated that these variations are linked to plate tectonic processes at mid-ocean ridges. These studies improved the understanding of calcifying marine organisms and their role in the global carbon cycle, and also had implications for geochemistry, mineralogy, tectonics, biological evolution (biomineralization), oil/gas resources, and climate change. In recognition, he was awarded the Francis J. Pettijohn Medal for Excellence by the Society for Sedimentary Geology in 2003.

Hardie completed field research on the modern shallow marine carbonates of the Bahamas with Bob Ginsburg and others. In 1977 he wrote a book on comparative sedimentology entitled Sedimentation on the modern carbonate tidal flats of northwest Andros Island, Bahamas. He went on to study ancient carbonates of western Maryland (Cambro-Ordovician) and the Italian Dolomites (Triassic). Hardie's work on carbonates advanced the understanding of climate and sea level change, and the role of Milankovitch cycles in carbonate deposition.

Another of Hardie's contributions involves the study of the origins of dolomite, a mineral associated with the world's oil reserves. When dolomite replaces calcite minerals, its slightly smaller molar volume leaves voids in carbonate rock, causing oil migration. In the Italian Dolomites, Hardie (with student Edith Wilson) demonstrated the hydrothermal origin of dolomite in the Triassic Latemar buildup.

Hardie and his students and colleagues also studied cyclic sedimentation, confirming that platform carbonates of the Middle Triassic (Anisian-Ladinian) of the Latemar buildup consist of a vertical stack of over 500 thin (ave. thickness 0.6-0.85m) shallowing-upward depositional cycles that record high frequency eustatic sea level oscillations in tune to Milankovitch astronomical rhythms. They described the details of the cycles and deposition and created computer simulations that accurately modeled the Latemar cyclostratigraphy using Milankovitch-controlled sea level oscillations.

== Awards and honors ==
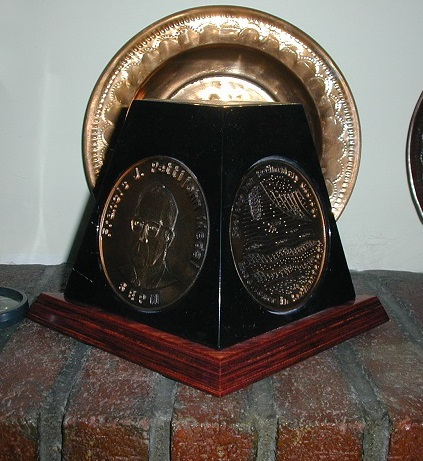
Francis J. Pettijohn Medal for Sedimentology, from the Society for Sedimentary Geology, 2003.

- Francis J. Pettijohn Medal for Sedimentology, from the Society for Sedimentary Geology, 2003.
- Selected by the Student Council of Johns Hopkins University as one of the top ten teachers in the School of Arts & Sciences in 1998.
- Oualline Distinguished Scholar at University of Texas, Austin, 1995.
- The "Hardie Teaching Laboratory", in Olin Hall at JHU has been dedicated in 2014.
- One of the annual Krieger School's Dean's Undergraduate Research Awards at JHU has been named after him, 2014.
- The Lawrence A. Hardie Memorial Fund in Earth and Planetary Sciences at JHU, 2014.
- Lawrence A. Hardie Commemorative Session, Geological Society of America meeting in Baltimore, MD, November 1–4, 2015.

== Personal life and death ==
Hardie and his wife Glenys became U.S. citizens. They had two children; his daughter Deborah obtained a degree in mathematics at JHU, and Russell studied engineering at Loyola University Maryland. His son Russell is currently a professor in the department of Electrical and Computer Engineering at the University of Dayton.

Hardie enjoyed jazz and attended concerts at the Famous Ballroom in Baltimore. After moving from Baltimore to Pasadena, Maryland, in the 1970s, Hardie took to sailing on the Magothy River and the Chesapeake Bay. He taught his children and many of his students to sail. He later took up snow skiing and golf.

Hardie died at age 80 from complications of Alzheimer's disease on December 17, 2013, at the Community Hospital of the Monterey Peninsula in Monterey, California.

== Selected publications ==
=== 1960s ===
- Hardie, Lawrence A (1962). "The Fault-Pattern of Coastal Natal: an Experimental Reproduction". Transactions of the Geological Society of South Africa. 65: 203–206.
- Hardie, Lawrence A.; Munoz, James L.; Donnay, Gabrielle; Donnay, J. D. H. (1964). "Morphological analysis of hodgkinsonite". American Mineralogist. 49: 415–420.
- Mason, Brian; Donnay, Gabrielle; Hardie, Lawrence A (1964). "Ferric tourmaline from Mexico". Science. 144 (3614): 71–73. Bibcode:1964Sci...144...71M. doi:10.1126/science.144.3614.71. PMID 17729799. S2CID 1067016.
- Hardie, Lawrence A (1967). "The gypsum-anhydrite equilibrium at one atmosphere pressure". The American Mineralogist. 52: 171–200.
- Hardie, Lawrence A (1968). "The origin of the recent non-marine evaporite deposit of Saline Valley, Inyo County, California". Geochimica et Cosmochimica Acta. 32 (12): 1279–1301. Bibcode:1968GeCoA..32.1279H. doi:10.1016/0016-7037(68)90029-x.

=== 1970s ===
- Hardie, Lawrence A; Eugster, Hans P (1970). "The evolution of closed-basin brines". Mineral. Soc. Am. Spec. Pap (3): 273–290.
- Hardie, Lawrence; Eugster, Hans P (1971). "The depositional environment of marine evaporites: a case for shallow, clastic accumulation". Sedimentology. 16 (6): 187–200. Bibcode:1971Sedim..16..187H. doi:10.1111/j.1365-3091.1971.tb00228.x.
- Bosellini, Alfonso; Hardie, Lawrence A (1973). "Depositional theme of a marginal marine evaporite". Sedimentology. 20 (1): 5–27. Bibcode:1973Sedim..20....5B. doi:10.1111/j.1365-3091.1973.tb01604.x.
- Eugster, Hans P; Hardie, Lawrence A (1975). "Sedimentation in an ancient playa-lake complex: the Wilkins Peak Member of the Green River Formation of Wyoming". Geological Society of America Bulletin. 86 (3): 319–334. Bibcode:1975GSAB...86..319E. doi:10.1130/0016-7606(1975)86<319:siaapc>2.0.co;2.
- Ginsburg, Robert N; Hardie, Lawrence A (1975). Tidal and storm deposits, northwestern Andros Island, Bahamas. Vol. 22. Springer Berlin Heidelberg. pp. 201–208.

=== 1980s ===
- Hardie, Lawrence A; Eugster, Hans P. (1980). "Evaporation of seawater: calculated mineral sequences". Science. 208 (4443): 498–500. Bibcode:1980Sci...208..498H. doi:10.1126/science.208.4443.498. PMID 17744561. S2CID 40321382.
- Demicco, Robert V; Hardie, Lawrence A (1981). "Patterns of platform and off-platform carbonate sedimentation in the upper Cambrian of the central Appalachians and their implications for sea level history". Short Papers for the 2nd International Symp. On the Cambrian System 1981, U.S.G.S. Open-File Report 81-743 (81–743): 67–70.
- Hardie, Lawrence A (1983). "Origin of CaCl2 brines by basalt-seawater interaction: Insights provided by some simple mass balance calculations". Contributions to Mineralogy and Petrology. 82 (2–3): 205–213. Bibcode:1983CoMP...82..205H. doi:10.1007/bf01166615. S2CID 129010544.
- Hardie, Lawrence A (1984). "Evaporites; marine or non-marine?". American Journal of Science. 284 (3): 193–240. Bibcode:1984AmJS..284..193H. doi:10.2475/ajs.284.3.193.
- Hardie, Lawrence A; Lowenstein, Timothy K; Spencer, Ronald J (1985). "The problem of distinguishing between primary and secondary features in evaporites". Sixth Int. Symposium on Salt 1983, Alexandria, Va., the Salt Institute. 1: 11–39.

=== 1990s ===
- Goldhammer, Robert K; Dunn, Paul A; Hardie, Lawrence A (1990). "Depositional cycles, composite sea level changes, cycle stacking patterns and the hierarchy of stratigraphic forcing: Examples form the platform carbonates of the Alpine Triassic". Geol. Soc. Am. Bull. 102 (5): 535–562. Bibcode:1990GSAB..102..535G. doi:10.1130/0016-7606(1990)102<0535:dccslc>2.3.co;2.
- Hardie, Lawrence A. (1990). "The roles of rifting and hydrothermal CaCl 2 brines in the origin of potash evaporites; an hypothesis". American Journal of Science. 290 (1): 43–106. Bibcode:1990AmJS..290...43H. doi:10.2475/ajs.290.1.43.
- Wilson, Edith Newton; Hardie, Lawrence A; Phillips, Owen M (1990). "Dolomitization front geometry, fluid flow patterns, and the origin of massive dolomite: the Triassic Latemar buildup, northern Italy". American Journal of Science. 290 (7): 741–796. Bibcode:1990AmJS..290..741W. doi:10.2475/ajs.290.7.741.
- Goldhammer, Robert K; Dunn, Paul A; Hardie, Lawrence A (1990). "Depositional cycles, composite sea-level changes, cycle stacking patterns, and the hierarchy of stratigraphic forcing: examples from Alpine Triassic platform carbonates". Geological Society of America Bulletin. 102 (5): 535–562. Bibcode:1990GSAB..102..535G. doi:10.1130/0016-7606(1990)102<0535:dccslc>2.3.co;2.
- Spencer, Ronald J; Hardie, Lawrence A (1990). "Control of seawater composition by mixing of river waters and mid-ocean ridge hydrothermal brines". In Fluid-Mineral Interactions: A Tribute to H.P. Eugster, Spec. Publ. No. 2, ed. R.J. Spencer and I-M Chou, San Antonio. Geochemical Society: 409–419.

=== 2000s ===
- Lowenstein, Tim K; Timofeeff, Michael N; Brennan, Sean T; Hardie, Lawrence A; Demicco, Robert V (2001). "Oscillations in Phanerozoic seawater chemistry: Evidence from fluid inclusions". Science. 294 (5544): 1086–1088. Bibcode:2001Sci...294.1086L. doi:10.1126/science.1064280. PMID 11691988. S2CID 2680231.
- Preto, Nereo; Hinnov, Linda A; Hardie, Lawrence A; De Zanche, Vittorio (2001). "Middle Triassic orbital signature recorded in the shallow-marine Latemar carbonate buildup (Dolomites, Italy)". Geology. 29 (12): 1123–1126. Bibcode:2001Geo....29.1123P. doi:10.1130/0091-7613(2001)029<1123:mtosri>2.0.co;2.
- Stanley, Steven M; Ries, Justin B; Hardie, Lawrence A (2002). "Low-magnesium calcite produced by coralline algae in seawater of Late Cretaceous composition". Proceedings of the National Academy of Sciences. 99 (24): 15323–15326. doi:10.1073/pnas.232569499. PMC 137715. PMID 12399549.
- Demicco, Robert V; Hardie, Lawrence A (2002). "The 'carbonate factory' revisited: A reexamination of sediment production functions used to model deposition on carbonate platforms". Journal of Sedimentary Research. 72 (6): 849–857. Bibcode:2002JSedR..72..849D. doi:10.1306/041502720849.
- Lowenstein, Tim K; Hardie, Lawrence A; Timofeeff, Michael N; Demicco, Robert V (2003). "Secular variation in seawater chemistry and the origin of calcium chloride basinal brines". Geology. 31 (10): 857–860. Bibcode:2003Geo....31..857L. doi:10.1130/g19728r.1.
