= Mełgiew =

- Village
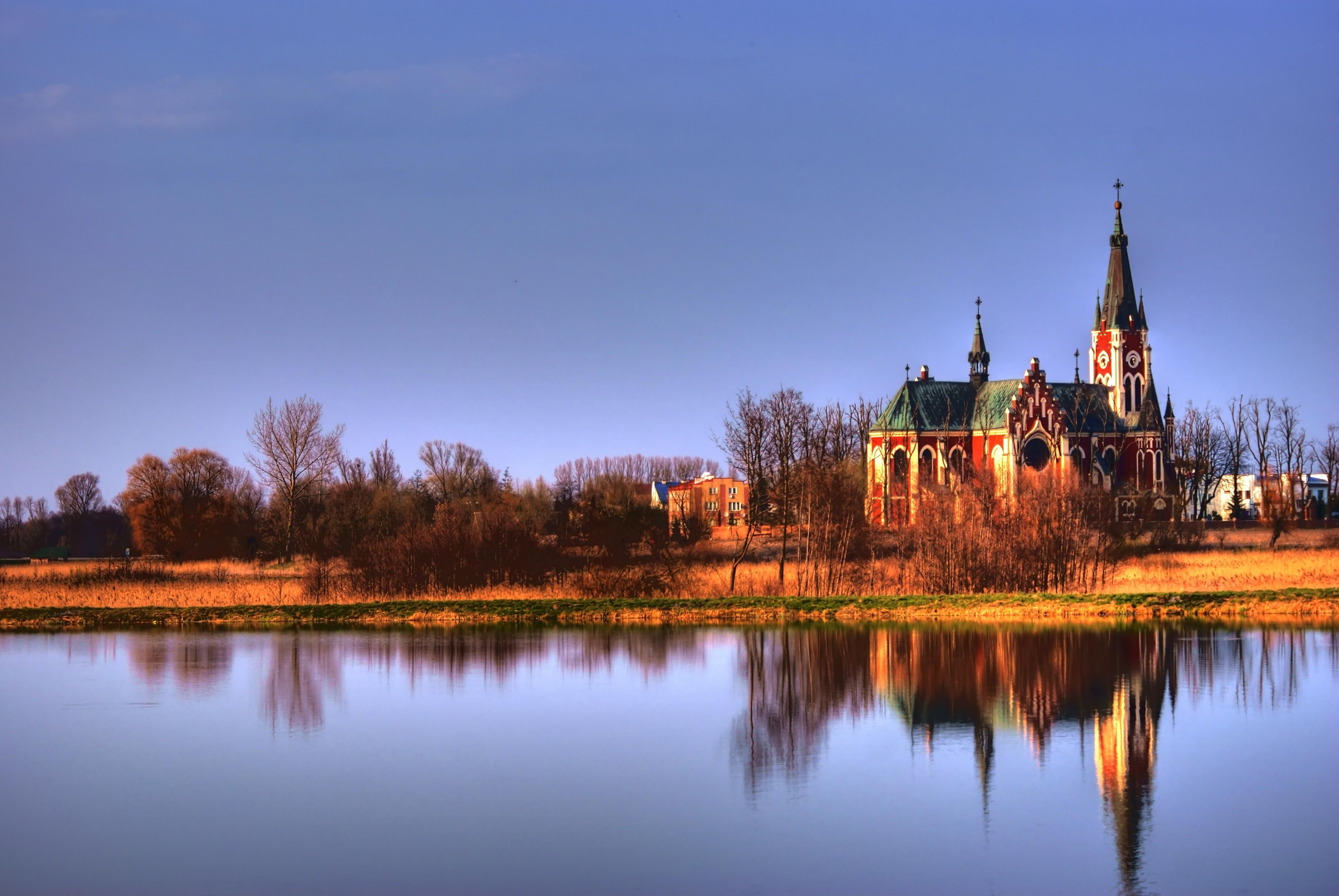
- Church of Saint Vitus

- Location within Poland
- Coordinates: 51°13′N 22°47′E
- Country: Poland
- Voivodeship: Lublin
- County: Świdnik
- Gmina: Mełgiew

Population
  - Total: 990
- Time zone: UTC+1 (CET)
  - Summer (DST): UTC+2 (CEST)
- Vehicle registration: LSW

Mełgiew [ˈmɛu̯ɡʲɛf] is a village in Świdnik County, Lublin Voivodeship, in eastern Poland. It is the seat of the gmina (administrative district) Gmina Mełgiew.
