= Minkowski =

Minkowski, Mińkowski or Minkovski (Slavic feminine: Minkowska, Mińkowska or Minkovskaya (Hebrew: מינקובסקי, Russian: Минковский) is a toponymic surname of Polish origin, derived from a place named Minkowice. Notable people with the surname include:

- Alyona Minkovski (born 1986), Russian-American correspondent and presenter
- Eugène Minkowski (1885–1972), French psychiatrist
- Françoise Minkowska (1882–1950), French psychiatrist
- Hermann Minkowski (1864–1909) Russian-born German mathematician and physicist, known for:
- Christopher Minkowski (born 1953), American Indologist
- Khristian Minkovski (born 1971), Bulgarian swimmer
- Marc Minkowski (born 1962), French conductor
- Oskar Minkowski (1858–1931), German physician
- Peter Minkowski (born 1941), Swiss physicist
- Pinhas Minkowsky (1859–1924), Russian hazzan
- Radoy Minkovski (born 1954), Bulgarian football coach
- Rudolph Minkowski (1895–1976), German-American astronomer
- Maurycy Minkowski (1881–1930) Polish Painter

== See also ==
- pl:Minkowski (herb szlachecki), Minkowski coat of arms
