= Jacków, Lublin Voivodeship =

Jacków
- Village
- Location within Poland
- Coordinates: 51°13′49″N 22°44′13″E
- Country: Poland
- Voivodeship: Lublin
- County: Świdnik
- Gmina: Mełgiew
- Population (approx.): 1,000

Jacków [ˈjat͡skuf] is a village in the administrative district of Gmina Mełgiew, within Świdnik County, Lublin Voivodeship, in eastern Poland.
