= Hans P. Eugster =

Swiss-American geochemist, mineralogist, and petrologist

Hans Peter Eugster
- Born: November 19, 1925; Igis, Graubünden, Switzerland
- Died: December 17, 1987 (aged 62); Baltimore, Maryland, USA
- Education: ETH Zurich
- Awards: Roebling Medal; V. M. Goldschmidt Award
- Scientific career
- Institutions: Carnegie Institution; Johns Hopkins University; University of Wyoming
- Doctoral advisor: Paul Niggli
- Other academic advisors: Hatten Yoder
- Doctoral students: Lawrence Alexander Hardie

Hans Peter Eugster (November 19, 1925, in Igis, Switzerland – December 17, 1987, in Baltimore, US) was a Swiss-American geochemist, mineralogist, and petrologist.

== Education ==
Eugster studied at ETH Zurich with Diplom in 1948 and D.Sc. in 1951 under Paul Niggli with a dissertation on metamorphic recrystallization in the eastern part of the Aar massif. As a postdoctoral fellow, Eugster studied optical spectroscopy from 1951 to 1952 at the Massachusetts Institute of Technology, where he was also influenced by research on petrology done by James Burleigh Thompson's team at Harvard University.

== Career ==
Eugster then went to the Geophysical Laboratory of the Carnegie Institution in Washington, DC. There, from 1952 to 1958, he studied experimental mineralogy under Hatten Yoder, specializing in high temperatures and aqueous fluid pressures.

... Hans initiated some of the earliest experimental studies of hydroxyl layer-silicate minerals such as phlogopite and muscovite. In an innovative attempt to extend his studies to a diverse group of chemically more complex natural minerals, Hans devised a buffer technique that allowed laboratory mineralogists for the first time to control fugacity in the redox investigations of phases containing elements of variable valence. This technical advance opened up a broad range of Fe-bearing phases to quantitative studies, previously unavailable due to lack of compositonal control.

He investigated the Green River Formation, later followed by worldwide investigations of other salt deposits. He became in 1958 Associate Professor of Experimental Petrology at Johns Hopkins University and in 1960 Professor. From 1983 to 1987 he was the director of the faculty of geosciences. He was also an adjunct professor at the University of Wyoming from 1970 onwards. He died unexpectedly from an aortic rupture.

== Awards and honors ==
He was elected in 1972 a member of the United States National Academy of Sciences and, in the same year, a fellow of the American Academy of Arts and Sciences. He received in 1983 the Roebling Medal, in 1976 the V. M. Goldschmidt Award, and in 1971 the Arthur L. Day Medal. In 1985 he was president of the Mineralogical Society of America.

The salt mineral eugsterite from Lake Victoria in Kenya was named after him in 1981.

== Personal life ==
His brother Conrad Hans Eugster was a chemist and professor at the University of Zurich. He was married to Elaine Koppelman.

== Selected works ==
- Heterogeneous reactions involving oxidation and reduction at high pressures and temperatures, J. Chem. Phys., Vol. 26, 1957, pp. 1760–1761
- with Charles Milton: Mineral assemblages in the Green River Formation, in P.H. Abelson, Researches in Geochemistry, Wiley 1959, pp. 18–150
- Reduction and Oxidation in Metamorphism, in P.H. Abelson, Researches in Geochemistry, Wiley 1959, pp. 397–426
- with B.M. French. Experimental control of oxygen fugacities by graphite-gas equilibriums, J. Geophys. Res., Vol. 70, 1965, pp. 1529–1539.
- with D.R. Wones: Stability of Biotite: Experiment, Theory, and Application., American Mineralogist, Vol. 50, 1965, pp. 1228–1272.
- with J. L. Munoz: Experimental control of fluorine reactions in hydrothermal systems. American Mineralogist, Vol. 54, 1969, pp. 943–959.
- with L.A. Hardie: The Evolution of Closed Basin Brines, Mineralogical Society of America Special Publ., 3, 1970, pp. 273–290
- The Beginnings of Experimental Petrology, Science, Vol. 173, 1971, pp. 481–489
- with C.E. Harvie, J.H. Weare, L. A. Hardie. Evaporation of sea water: Calculated mineral sequences, Science, Vol. 208, 1980, pp. 498–500.
- Oil shales, evaporites and ore deposits. Geochim. et Cosmochim. Acta, Vol. 49, 1985, pp. 619–635.
- with R.J. Spencer, B.F. Jones, S.L. Rettig: Geochemistry of Great Salt Lake, Utah, Part 1, 2, Geochim. et Cosmochim. Acta, Vol. 49, 1985, pp. 727–737, 739–774
