= Dominów, Świdnik County =

Dominów
- Village
- Location within Poland
- Coordinates: 51°13′N 22°50′E
- Country: Poland
- Voivodeship: Lublin
- County: Świdnik
- Gmina: Mełgiew

Population
  - Total: 680
- Time zone: UTC+1 (CET)
  - Summer (DST): UTC+2 (CEST)

Dominów [dɔˈminuf] is a village in the administrative district of Gmina Mełgiew, within Świdnik County, Lublin Voivodeship, in eastern Poland.

== History ==
Eight Polish citizens were murdered by Nazi Germany in the village during World War II.
