= Janowice, Świdnik County =

Janowice
- Village
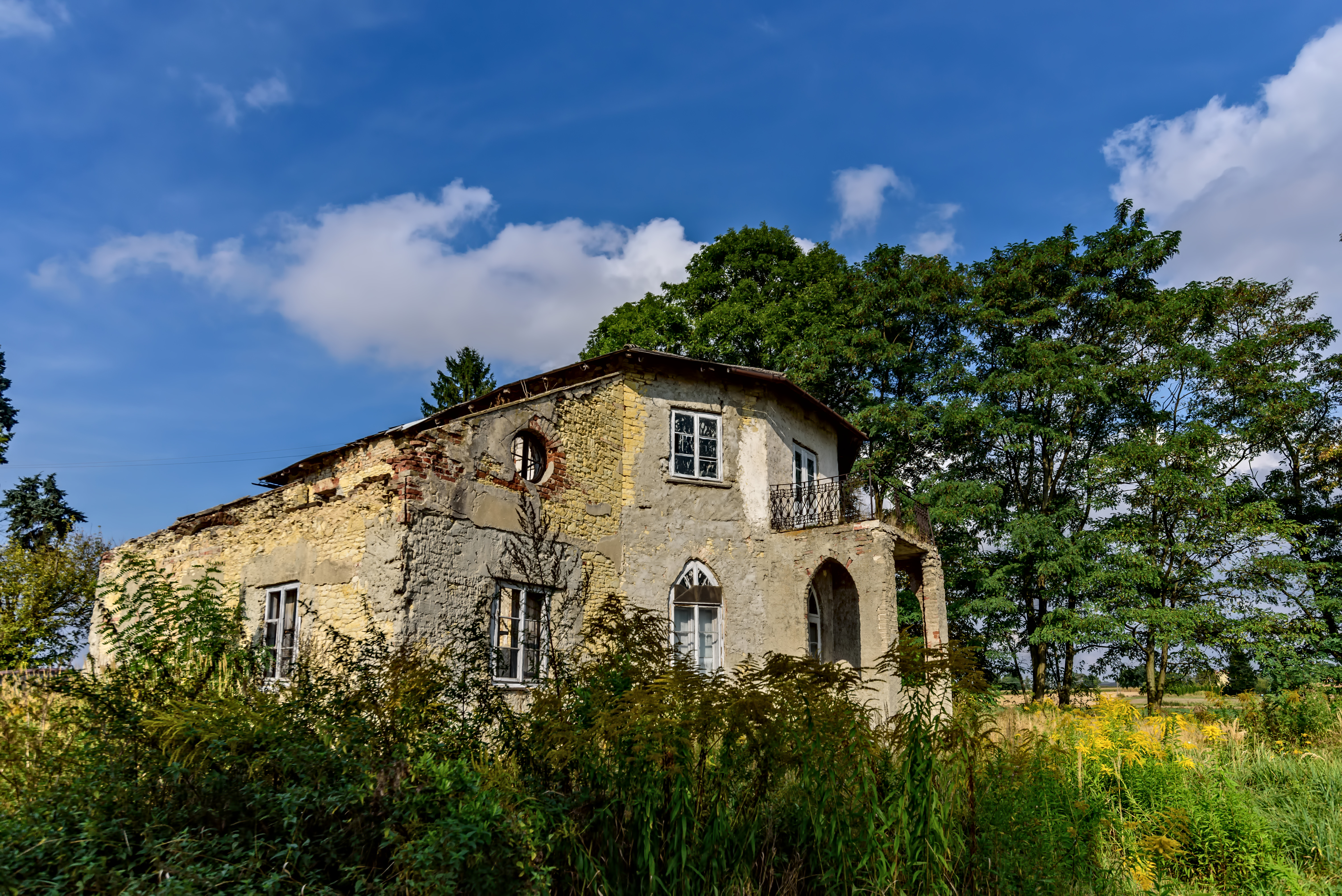
- Old manor in Janowice

- Location within Poland
- Coordinates: 51°15′N 22°46′E
- Country: Poland
- Voivodeship: Lublin
- County: Świdnik
- Gmina: Mełgiew
- Time zone: UTC+1 (CET)
  - Summer (DST): UTC+2 (CEST)

Janowice [janɔˈvit͡sɛ] is a village in the administrative district of Gmina Mełgiew, within Świdnik County, Lublin Voivodeship, in eastern Poland.

== History ==
Five Polish citizens were murdered by Nazi Germany in the village during World War II.
