= Janówek, Gmina Mełgiew =

Janówek
- Village
- Location within Poland
- Coordinates: 51°15′31″N 22°44′07″E
- Country: Poland
- Voivodeship: Lublin
- County: Świdnik
- Gmina: Mełgiew

Janówek [jaˈnuvɛk] is a village in the administrative district of Gmina Mełgiew, within Świdnik County, Lublin Voivodeship, in eastern Poland.
