= Krzesimów =

- Village
- Location within Poland
- Coordinates: 51°15′N 22°48′E
- Country: Poland
- Voivodeship: Lublin
- County: Świdnik
- Gmina: Mełgiew

Krzesimów [kʂɛˈɕimuf] is a village in the administrative district of Gmina Mełgiew, within Świdnik County, Lublin Voivodeship, in eastern Poland.

In 1944 a forced labour camp (no. 120) for members of the Home Army and other organisations loyal to the Polish government in exile was set up in the village by the communist-run, Soviet-sponsored Ministry of Public Security. Officially closed in 1948, in fact it continued to operate for some time. The camp was based in the local farm estate. Prisoners were kept in pigsties, with scant food rations and no medical care. During the camp's existence at least several hundred prisoners died, some shot by the Soviet NKVD; the actual number of victims is estimated at c. 1500.

The existence of the camp was kept secret by the communist authorities for many years; it was only when human remains were discovered during roadworks in 1996 that it came to the knowledge of historians and the wider public.
