= Piotrówek Pierwszy =

- Village
- Location within Poland
- Coordinates: 51°15′24″N 22°50′56″E
- Country: Poland
- Voivodeship: Lublin
- County: Świdnik
- Gmina: Mełgiew
- Population: 110

Piotrówek Pierwszy [pjɔˈtruvɛk ˈpjɛrfʂɨ] is a village in the administrative district of Gmina Mełgiew, within Świdnik County, Lublin Voivodeship, in eastern Poland.
