= Trzeszkowice =

- Village
- Location within Poland
- Coordinates: 51°15′N 22°48′E
- Country: Poland
- Voivodeship: Lublin
- County: Świdnik
- Gmina: Mełgiew

Trzeszkowice [tʂɛʂkɔˈvit͡sɛ] is a village in the administrative district of Gmina Mełgiew, within Świdnik County, Lublin Voivodeship, in eastern Poland.
