= Podzamcze, Świdnik County =

Podzamcze
- Village
- Location within Poland
- Coordinates: 51°12′03″N 22°48′07″E
- Country: Poland
- Voivodeship: Lublin
- County: Świdnik
- Gmina: Mełgiew

Podzamcze [pɔˈd͡zamt͡ʂɛ] is a village in the administrative district of Gmina Mełgiew, within Świdnik County, Lublin Voivodeship, in eastern Poland.
