= Gmina Mełgiew =

Gmina Mełgiew Mełgiew Commune
- Gmina
- Flag Coat of arms
- Interactive map of Gmina Mełgiew
- Coordinates (Mełgiew): 51°13′N 22°47′E
- Country: Poland
- Voivodeship: Lublin
- County: Świdnik
- Seat: Mełgiew

Area
  - Total: 95.64 km^{2} (36.93 sq mi)

Population (2015)
  - Total: 9,448
  - Density: 98.79/km^{2} (255.9/sq mi)
- Website: https://www.melgiew.pl

Gmina Mełgiew is a rural gmina (administrative district) in Świdnik County, Lublin Voivodeship, in eastern Poland. Its seat is the village of Mełgiew, which lies approximately 6 kilometres (4 mi) east of Świdnik and 16 km (10 mi) east of the regional capital Lublin.

The gmina covers an area of 95.64 square kilometres (36.9 sq mi), and as of 2006 its total population is 8,352 (9,448 in 2015).

== Villages ==
Gmina Mełgiew contains the villages and settlements of Dominów, Franciszków, Jacków, Janówek, Janowice, Józefów, Krępiec, Krzesimów, Lubieniec, Mełgiew, Minkowice, Minkowice-Kolonia, Nowy Krępiec, Piotrówek Pierwszy, Podzamcze, Trzeciaków, Trzeszkowice and Żurawniki.

== Neighbouring gminas ==
Gmina Mełgiew is bordered by the town of Świdnik and by the gminas of Głusk, Łęczna, Milejów, Piaski and Wólka.
