= Józefów, Gmina Mełgiew =

Józefów
- Village
- Location within Poland
- Coordinates: 51°15′51″N 22°46′41″E
- Country: Poland
- Voivodeship: Lublin
- County: Świdnik
- Gmina: Mełgiew

Józefów (Polish pronunciation: [juˈzɛfuf]) is a village in the administrative district of Gmina Mełgiew, within Świdnik County, Lublin Voivodeship, in eastern Poland.
