= Radoy Minkovski =

Bulgarian football coach (born 1954)

Rudi Minkovski
Personal information
- Full name: Radoy Hristov Minkovski
- Date of birth: 18 January 1954
- Place of birth: Bulgaria

Managerial career
- Years: Team
- 1998: Cherno More
- 2007–2008: PSM Makassar
- 2009: PFC Haskovo
- PFC Levski Sofia (youth)
- 2013: Myanmar U19 (women)

Radoy Minkovski (Bulgarian: Руди / Радой Минковский born 18 January 1954 in Bulgaria) is a Bulgarian football coach who is last known to have been in charge of the Myanmar women's under-19 football team in 2013.

== Career ==
=== Indonesia ===
Installed as head coach of PSM Makassar in 2007, the Bulgarian tactician's contract was not extended in January 2008, after supporters asked for his immediate dismissal when PSM hosted and Arema were beaten 2-0. Next, Minkovski went back to Bulgaria when the PSM management paid him the salary he would have earned for the remainder of his contract.

Has worked with the Fantastic Eleven, an exhibition team composed of the best foreigners in the Indonesia Super League in 2008-09.

=== Myanmar ===
Taking charge of the Myanmar Women U19s to the 2013 AFC U-19 Women's Championship, Minkovski lead them to an opening 7-0 defeat to Japan, before losing 2-0 to North Korea, in which he stated that Myanmar made a conspicuous improvement post-match; however, this was followed by China beating them 8-0, resulting in the White Angels finishing bottom of the tournament.
