= Dorsum Niggli =

Wrinkle ridge on the Moon

Dorsum Niggli is a wrinkle ridge at 29.0°N 52.0°W in Oceanus Procellarum on the Moon. It is 50 km long and was named after Paul Niggli in 1976.
