= Krępiec, Lublin Voivodeship =

Krępiec
- Village
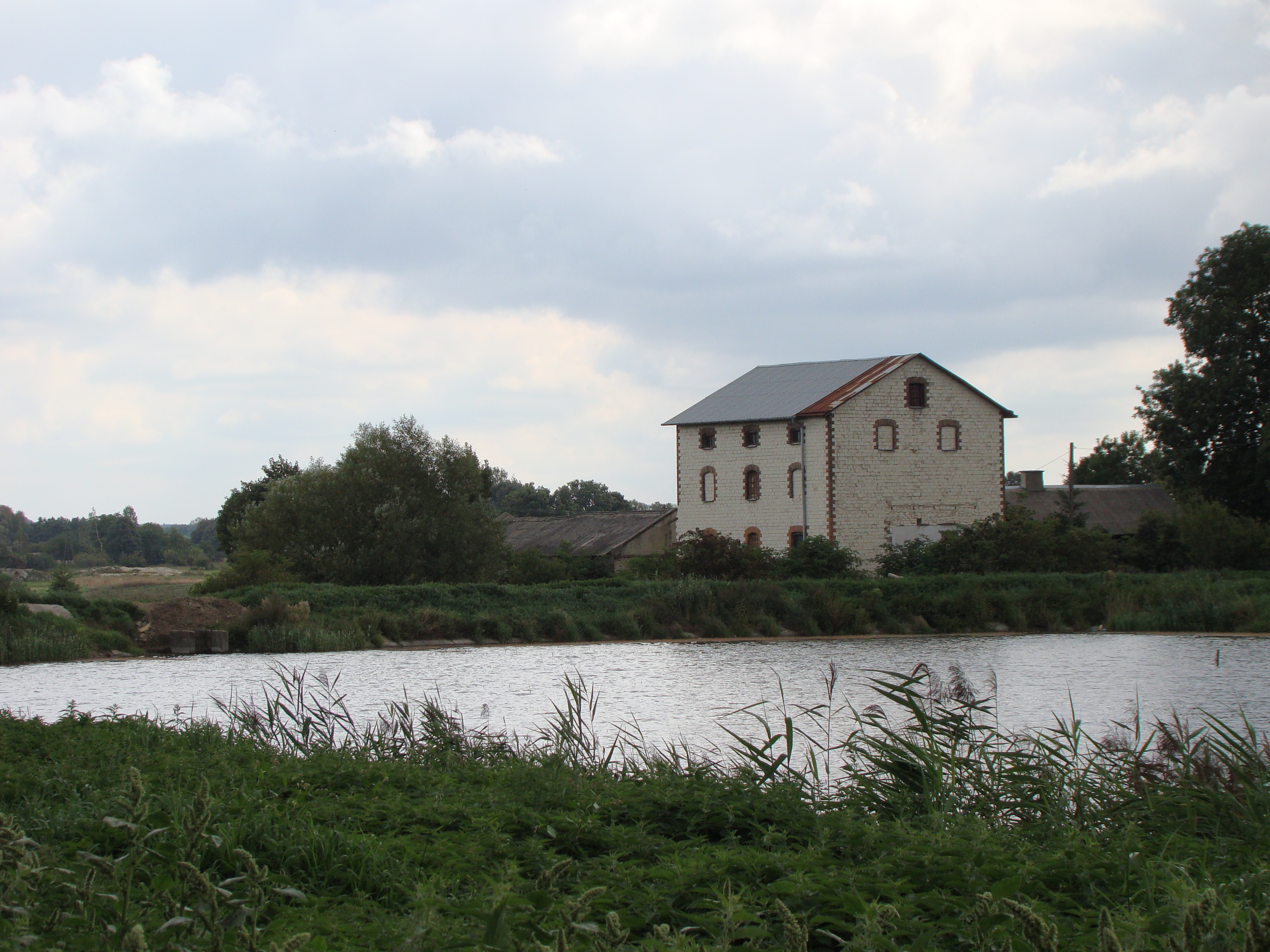
- Old watermill

- Location within Poland
- Coordinates: 51°12′N 22°44′E
- Country: Poland
- Voivodeship: Lublin
- County: Świdnik
- Gmina: Mełgiew
- Time zone: UTC+1 (CET)
  - Summer (DST): UTC+2 (CEST)
- Vehicle registration: LSW

Krępiec [ˈkrɛmpjɛt͡s] is a village in the administrative district of Gmina Mełgiew, within Świdnik County, Lublin Voivodeship, in eastern Poland.

== History ==
As of the 1880s, the village had a distillery, brewery and a watermill. According to the 1921 Polish census, the village had a population of 941, 99.9% Polish and 0.1% Ukrainian.

Following the German-Soviet invasion of Poland, which started World War II in September 1939, the village was occupied by Germany until 1944. In 1942–1943, the German gendarmerie and Ukrainian auxiliaries murdered a number of Poles and Jews, brought from the Majdanek concentration camp.

== Architecture and monuments ==
- Old chapel built in the 19th century.
- mill built in '20 age of XX century
