= Francis J. Pettijohn =

American geologist

Francis John Pettijohn (June 20, 1904 – April 23, 1999) was an American geologist who served for many years on the faculty of Johns Hopkins University.

Pettijohn received his doctorate from the University of Minnesota in 1923 based on a study of Precambrian sedimentology and structure of an area around Abram Lake, Ontario. In 1929 he obtained a position at the University of Chicago. He became a full professor there in 1949. In 1943 he published an important work on Archaean sedimentation. In 1952 he moved to Johns Hopkins University where he remained until retirement in 1973.

== Honors and awards ==
He received the Penrose Medal from the Geological Society of America in 1975. Other awards include the Twenhofel Medal of the Society of Economic Paleontologists and Mineralogists, the Wollaston Medal of the Geological Society of London and the Sorby Medal of the International Association of Sedimentologists. Francis J. Pettijohn medal from Society for Sedimentary Geology in 1992

== Books ==
- Paleocurrents and Basin Analysis, Springer (1963; 1977) ISBN 978-3-540-07952-1
- Sand and Sandstone, Springer (1972) ISBN 978-3-540-05528-0
- Sedimentary Rocks, Harpercollins; 3rd edition (1983) ISBN 978-0-06-045191-2
- Atlas and Glossary of Sedimentary Structures, Springer Verlag (1964) ISBN 978-0-387-03194-1
- Memoirs of an Unrepentant Field Geologist, University of Chicago Press (1984) ISBN 978-0-226-66403-3
- Studies of Appalachian Geology: Central and Southern, editor, Wiley (1970) ISBN 978-0-471-26142-1
