= Nowy Krępiec =

- Village
- Location within Poland
- Coordinates: 51°12′26″N 22°44′49″E
- Country: Poland
- Voivodeship: Lublin
- County: Świdnik
- Gmina: Mełgiew

Nowy Krępiec [ˈnɔvɨ ˈkrɛmpjɛt͡s] is a village in the administrative district of Gmina Mełgiew, within Świdnik County, Lublin Voivodeship, in eastern Poland.
