= Franciszków, Świdnik County =

Franciszków
- Village
- Location within Poland
- Coordinates: 51°13′N 22°44′E
- Country: Poland
- Voivodeship: Lublin
- County: Świdnik
- Gmina: Mełgiew
- Elevation: 190 m (620 ft)
- Population: 480

Franciszków (Polish pronunciation: [fraɲˈt͡ɕiʂkuf]) is a village in the administrative district of Gmina Mełgiew, within Świdnik County, Lublin Voivodeship, in eastern Poland.
