= Minkowice-Kolonia =

- Village
- Location within Poland
- Coordinates: 51°13′01″N 22°46′22″E
- Country: Poland
- Voivodeship: Lublin
- County: Świdnik
- Gmina: Mełgiew

Minkowice-Kolonia [miŋkɔˈvit͡sɛ kɔˈlɔɲa] is a village in the administrative district of Gmina Mełgiew, within Świdnik County, Lublin Voivodeship, in eastern Poland.
