= Paul Niggli =

Swiss crystallographer, mineralogist, and petrologist (1888–1953)

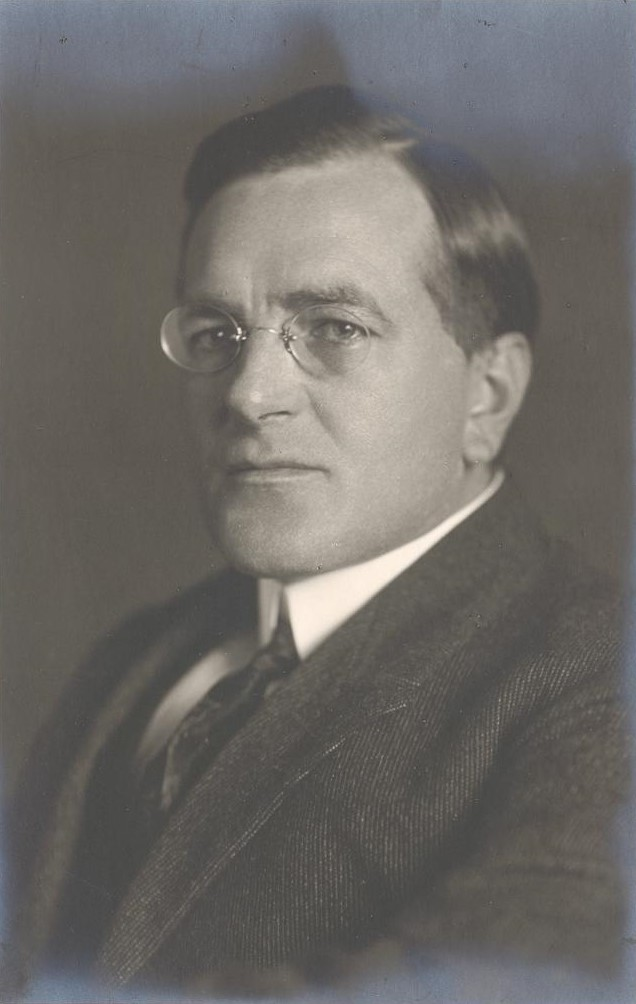
- Born: 26 June 1888; Zofingen, Switzerland
- Died: 13 January 1953 (aged 64); Zürich, Switzerland
- Education: ETH Zurich; University of Zurich
- Known for: Niggli reduction
- Children: Ernst Niggli; Hedi Fritz-Niggli
- Awards: Marcel Benoist Prize (1929); Roebling Medal (1947); Hayden Memorial Geological Award (1947)
- Scientific career
- Workplaces: Leipzig University; University of Tübingen; University of Zurich; ETH Zurich
- Thesis: Die Chloritoidschiefer des nordöstlichen Gotthardmassives (1912)
- Doctoral advisor: Ulrich Grubenmann
- Doctoral students: Fritz Laves; Hans P. Eugster

Paul Niggli (26 June 1888 – 13 January 1953) was a Swiss crystallographer, mineralogist, and petrologist who was a leader in the field of X-ray crystallography.

== Education and career ==
Niggli was born in Zofingen and studied at the Swiss Federal Institute of Technology (ETH) in Zürich and the University of Zurich, where he obtained a doctorate. His 1919 book, Geometrische Kristallographie des Diskontinuums, played a seminal role in the refinement of space group theory. In this book, Niggli demonstrated that although X-ray reflection conditions do not always uniquely determine the space group to which a crystal belongs, they do reveal a small number of possible space groups to which it could belong. Niggli used morphological methods to account for internal structure and, in his 1928 Kristallographische und Strukturtheoretische Grundbegriffe, he took up what is essentially the reverse process, the task of establishing the connection between space lattices and external crystal morphology. The great aim of his life was to integrate the whole field of Earth sciences.

In 1920, Niggli became the lead scientist at the ETH's Institut für Mineralogie und Petrographie, where he brought his systematic approach to the study of crystal morphologies using X-ray diffraction. In 1935, Niggli and his doctoral student Werner Nowacki (1909–1988) determined the 73 three-dimensional arithmetic crystal classes (symmorphic space groups). Niggli retired from the Institute in 1949. He was also professor of mineralogy at the ETH Zurich and at the University of Zurich.

Niggli succeeded Paul Heinrich von Groth (1843–1927) as editor of Zeitschrift für Kristallographie.

== Honors and awards ==
In 1948, Niggli was awarded the Roebling Medal of the Mineralogical Society of America.

Since 1988 the Paul Niggli Foundation awards medals to outstanding Swiss mineral scientists below the age of 35 with a strong perspective for an academic career.

Dorsum Niggli on the Moon was named after him.

== Personal life ==
Niggli married Hedwig Dübendorfer (later Hedwig Niggli) in 1915. He had two children with her, Ernst Niggli and Hedi Fritz-Niggli.

== Bibliography ==
- Niggli, Paul (1919). Geometrische Kristallographie des Diskontinuums (in German). Leipzig Gebr. Borntraeger.
- Niggli, Paul (1924). "Lehrbuch der Mineralogie" (in German).
- Niggli, Paul (1928). "Krystallographische und strukturtheoretische grundbegriffe" (in German).
- Niggli, Paul (1945). Grundlagen der Stereochemie (in German). Basel: Springer Basel. doi:10.1007/978-3-0348-4111-5. ISBN 978-3-0348-4039-2.
- Niggli, Paul (1949). "Probleme der Naturwissenschaften, erläutert am Begriff der Mineralart" (in German).
- Niggli, Paul; Niggli, Ernst (1952). Gesteine Und Minerallagerstätten (in German). Basel: Birkhäuser Basel. doi:10.1007/978-3-0348-7173-0. ISBN 978-3-0348-7174-7.
