= Vineyard Playhouse =

American theater company

Coordinates: 41°27′19.7″N 70°36′14.4″W

The Vineyard Playhouse is a professional, non-profit working theater company on the island of Martha's Vineyard. Housed in a historic building in downtown Vineyard Haven, MA, the theater produces shows year-round. It also hosts programs for children, and was described in the Vineyard Gazette as "the longest running professional theatre on the Island."

== History ==
The Playhouse was established in 1982 by Eileen Wilson and Isabella Blake, according to the Playhouse's website, and the theatre company celebrated its 25th anniversary in 2007.

== Repertoire ==
The repertoire ranges from summer shows featuring Broadway-quality actors as well as talented locals, to less posh but also impressive off-season shows, usually featuring local professional actors and members of the community. Traditionally the Christmas production is a family-oriented show that includes a large number of children. Most shows during the summer season are intended for adult audiences, but other shows are family-appropriate, and include roles for all ages. Some previous shows include The Snow Queen, The Homecoming, The Rimers of Eldridge, Romeo and Juliet, and Proof.

== Relationship With and Contributions to the Vineyard Community ==
MJ Bruder Munafo, the Playhouse's Artistic Director, has a reputation for supporting local artists and writers. The Playhouse often hosts readings of new works in progress, or stages pieces that show artistic merit.
