= Żurawniki, Lublin Voivodeship =

Żurawniki
- Village
- Location within Poland
- Coordinates: 51°14′N 22°51′E
- Country: Poland
- Voivodeship: Lublin
- County: Świdnik
- Gmina: Mełgiew

Żurawniki [ʐuravˈniki] is a village in the administrative district of Gmina Mełgiew, within Świdnik County, Lublin Voivodeship, in eastern Poland.
