= Minkowice, Lublin Voivodeship =

Minkowice
- Village
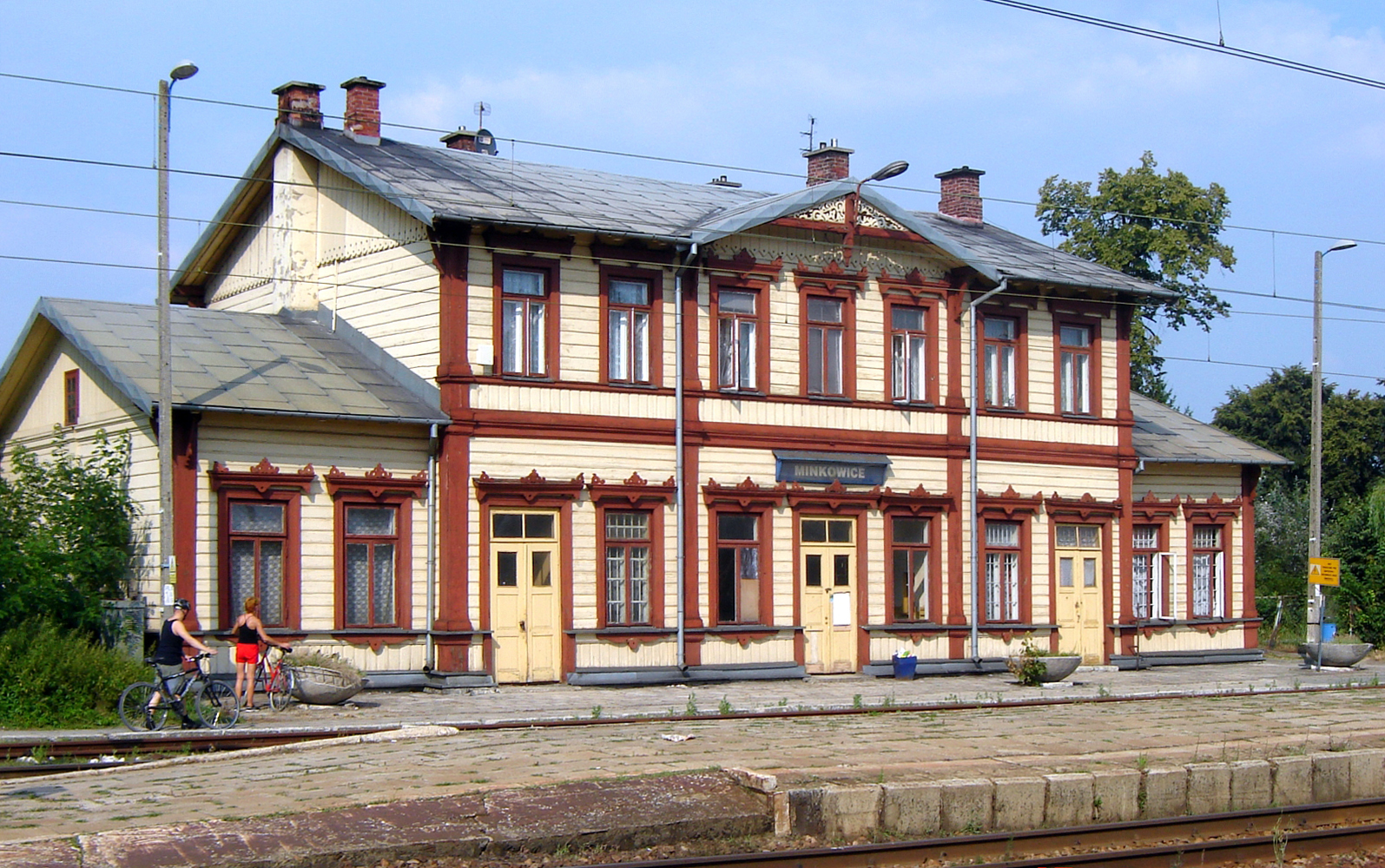
- Train station

- Location within Poland
- Coordinates: 51°13′30″N 22°46′7″E
- Country: Poland
- Voivodeship: Lublin
- County: Świdnik
- Gmina: Mełgiew

Minkowice [miŋkɔˈvit͡sɛ] is a village in the administrative district of Gmina Mełgiew, within Świdnik County, Lublin Voivodeship, in eastern Poland.
