= Trawniki men =

Central and Eastern European Nazi military unit

Coordinates: 51°08′21″N 22°59′35″E

Trawnikimänner
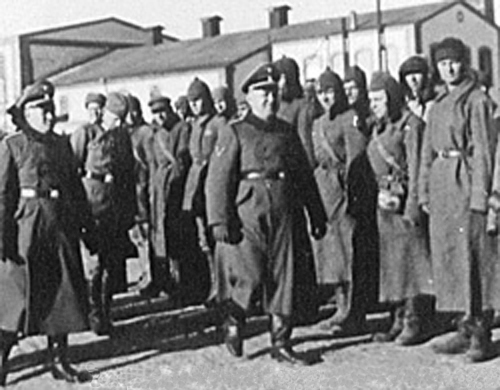
- Inspection of Trawnikimänner (some of them still wearing Soviet Budenovkas) by SS-Hauptsturmführer Karl Streibel (center) at the SS Trawniki training division. As Hiwis, they were tasked with liquidating Nazi-era Jewish ghettos in occupied Poland
- Active: Founded in 1941
- Country: German-occupied Poland
- Allegiance: Nazi Germany
- Branch: Schutzstaffel; Totenkopfverbände
- Type: Paramilitary police reserve
- Role: Logistical support for Order Police battalions and the SS during Operation Reinhard; shooting actions, deportations to death camps
- Size: Over 5,000 Hiwis

During World War II, Trawniki men ([travˈniki]; German: Trawnikimänner) were Eastern European Nazi collaborators, consisting of either volunteers or recruits from prisoner-of-war camps set up by Nazi Germany for Soviet Red Army soldiers captured in the border regions during Operation Barbarossa launched in June 1941. Thousands of these volunteers served in the General Government territory of German-occupied Poland until the end of World War II. Trawnikis belonged to a category of Hiwis (German abbreviation for Hilfswilliger, literally "those willing to help"), Nazi auxiliary forces recruited from native subjects serving in various jobs such as concentration camp guards.

Between September 1941 and September 1942, the German SS and police trained 2,500 Trawniki men known as Hiwi Wachmänner (guards) at the special training camp at Trawniki outside of Lublin; by the end of 1944, 5,082 men were on active duty. Trawnikimänner were organized by Streibel into two SS Sonderdienst battalions. Some 1,000 Hiwis are known to have run away during field operations. Although the majority of Trawniki men or Hiwis came from among the prisoners of war, there were also Volksdeutsche from Eastern Europe among them, valued because of their ability to speak Russian, Ukrainian and other languages of the occupied territories. All the officers at the Trawniki camp were Reichsdeutsche (citizens of the German Reich), and most of the squad commanders were Volksdeutsche (people whose language and culture had German origins but who did not hold German citizenship). The conscripted civilians and former Soviet POWs included Armenians, Azerbaijanis, Belarusians, Estonians, Georgians, Latvians, Lithuanians, Russians, Tatars, and Ukrainians. The Trawnikis took a major part in Operation Reinhard, the Nazi plan to exterminate Jews. They also served at extermination camps and played an important role in the annihilation of the Warsaw Ghetto Uprising (see the Stroop Report), among others.

== Creation ==
In 1941 Himmler instructed SS officer Odilo Globocnik to start recruiting mainly Ukrainian auxiliaries among the Soviet POWs, due to ongoing close relations with the local Ukrainian Hilfsverwaltung. Globocnik had selected Karl Streibel from Operation Reinhard as the key person for this new secret project. Streibel, with the assistance of his officers, visited all POW camps for the Soviets behind the lines of the advancing Wehrmacht, and after individual screening recruited Ukrainian as well as Latvian and Lithuanian volunteers as ordered.

Due to successful adaptation of the Soviet Army's strategy and tactics against German forces, as well as the Nazi policy of Soviet war prisoners' extermination, the influx of POWs was dramatically reduced, so Streibel's personnel from the summer of 1942 started to conscript civilians of Ukrainian nationality, generally young males, from Western Ukraine (Galicia, Volhynia, Podolia and Lublin).

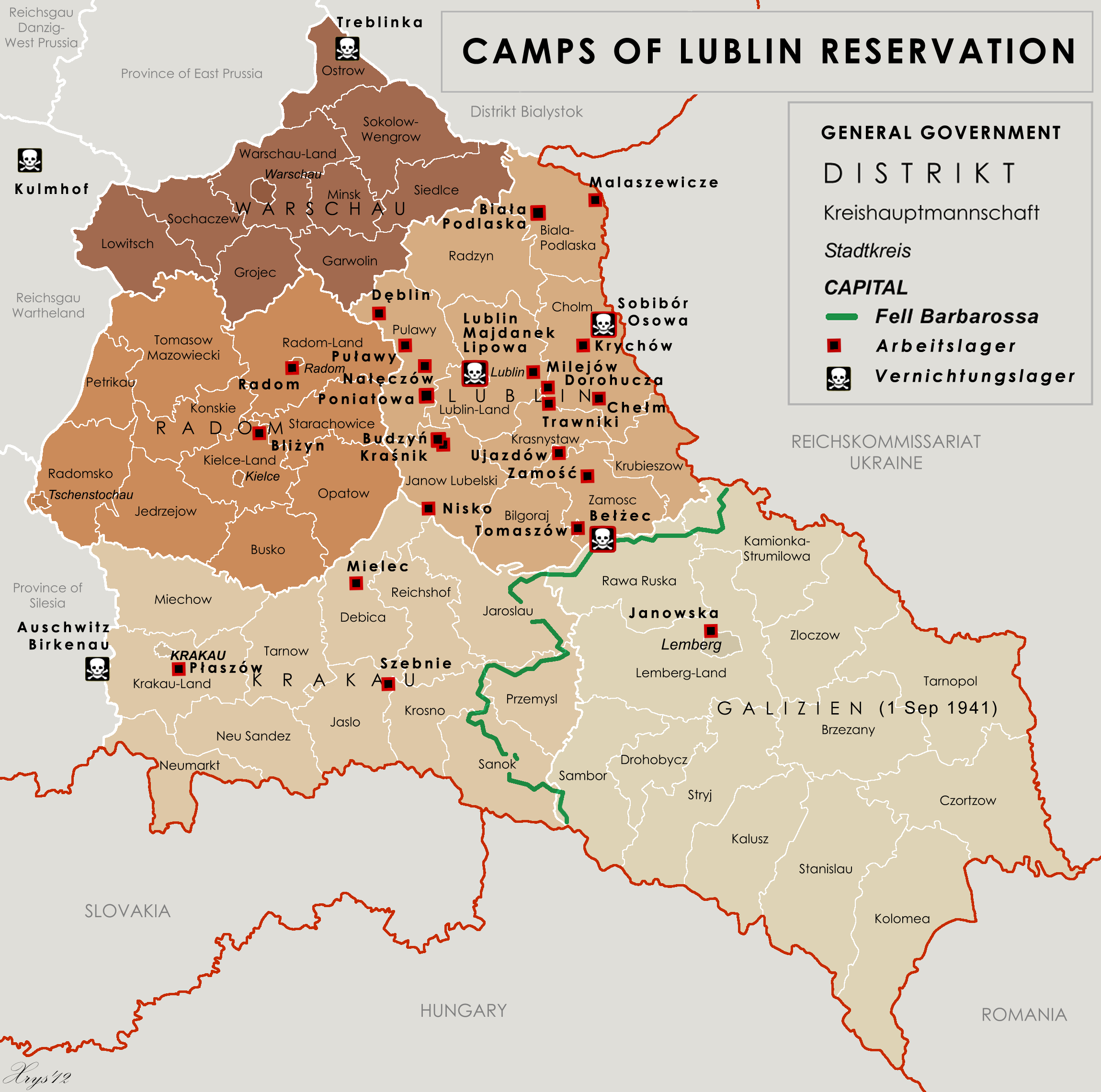
Location of the SS Trawniki training compound in between target camps of Lublin Reservation (General Government)

The Trawniki-men were assembled at a training facility adjacent to the Trawniki concentration camp built for the Jews deported from the Warsaw Ghetto. The complex (serving dual purpose in 1941–43) was set up in the industrialized village of Trawniki about 40 kilometres (25 mi) southeast of Lublin with rail lines in all directions in the occupied territory. From there, the Hiwi shooters were deployed to all major killing sites of the Final Solution. It was their primary purpose of training. They took an active role in the extermination of Jews at Belzec, Sobibor, Treblinka II, Warsaw (three times), Częstochowa, Lublin, Lvov, Radom, Kraków, Białystok (twice), Majdanek as well as Auschwitz, not to mention Trawniki concentration camp itself, and the remaining subcamps of KL Lublin/Majdanek camp complex including Poniatowa, Budzyn, Kraśnik, Puławy, Lipowa, and also during massacres in Łomazy, Międzyrzec, Łuków, Radzyń, Parczew, Końskowola, Komarówka and all other locations, augmented by the SS and Schupo, as well as the Reserve Police Battalion 101, part of over two dozen Order Police battalions deployed to the occupied territories. The German Order Police performed roundups inside the Jewish ghettos in German-occupied Poland shooting everyone unable to move or attempting to flee, while the Trawnikis conducted large-scale civilian massacres in the same locations.

== Organization ==
Auxiliaries were not allowed to wear German uniforms or insignia, carry German weapons, or use German ranks. This was mostly for political reasons. The racial policies of Nazi Germany regarded Slavs as subhuman and not deserving to be treated as German soldiers. There was also a real fear of mutiny or desertion by foreigners in German uniform. To reinforce the social levels between them, guards were therefore referred to as Wachmänner ("watchmen") rather than Schützen ("riflemen") and given different uniforms and rank insignia. A practical reason for this policy was that there was a dearth of German equipment to be spared, yet piles of captured war materiel that would otherwise be unused.

The German officers and senior NCOs were issued the obsolete black M32 SS tunic or field-grey M37 tunic with blue facings. This was to mark them out from the men they commanded, but at the same time denoted them as auxiliaries rather than regular troops.

Units were initially organized in Gruppen (Gruppe ["Group"] > "squad") of about 50 men and Züge (Zug ["Procession"] > "platoon") of around 90 to 120 men. These were further assigned to companies and battalions, under German officers and higher-level NCOs. After they abandoned Trawniki in 1944 ahead of the Soviet advance, they were reorganized into combat units. This is when they introduced the Rotten (Rotte ["Chain"] > "File" or "Fire Team") level of organization at a time when the depleted German Army was consolidating into Halbzüge ("half-platoons" or "Sections"). This was perhaps adopted to deter desertion, a big problem towards the end of the war.

Wachmänner Ranks (1942–1945)
Dienstgrad	Translation	Equivalent SS / Heer Rank	Duties	Notes
Oberzugwachmann	"Senior Platoon Guard"	SS-Oberscharführer / Feldwebel	Senior Platoon Sergeant	Created in 1944, highest NCO rank
Zugwachmann	"Platoon Guard"	SS-Scharführer / Unterfeldwebel	Platoon Sergeant	Created 19 October 1942
Gruppenwachmann	"Squad Guard"	SS-Unterscharführer / Unteroffizier	Squad Leader or Corporal	Created 19 October 1942
Rottwachmann	"File Guard"	SS-Rottenfuhrer / Gefreiter	File Leader or Lance Corporal	Created in 1944, highest enlisted rank
Oberwachmann	"Senior Guard"	SS-Oberschütze / Oberschütze	Senior Private	Created 19 October 1942
Wachmann	"Watchman" or "Guard"	SS-Schütze / Schütze	Private	Created 19 October 1942

The guards initially wore their Soviet Army uniforms. In the autumn of 1941 they were given the dyed-black Polish Army uniforms worn by the former Selbstschutz forces. In the summer of 1942 they were issued brown Belgian Army uniforms for warm weather wear. The guardsmen tended to wear a mixture of the two. They were usually issued captured enemy weapons but sometimes received German Mauser Kar-98 carbines. Automatic rifles and pistols were issued when on special assignment.

== Role of Trawniki men in the Final Solution ==
At each of the Operation Reinhard extermination camps Trawniki Hiwi men served as the Sonderkommando guard units (between 70 and 120 depending on location) and were selected to act as the gas chambers operators. They came under the jurisdiction of the relevant camp commandant. Almost all of the Trawniki guards were involved in shooting, beating, and terrorizing Jews. The Russian historian Sergei Kudryashov, who made a study of the Trawniki men serving at death camps, claimed that there was little sign of any attraction to National Socialism among them. He claimed that most of the guards volunteered in order to leave the POW camps and/or because of self-interest. On the other hand, the Holocaust historian Christopher R. Browning wrote that Hiwis "were screened on the basis of their anti-Communist and hence almost invariably anti-Semitic sentiments." Despite the generally apathetic views of the Trawniki guards, the vast majority faithfully carried out the SS expectations in the mistreatment of Jews. Most Trawniki men had executed Jews already as part of their job training. Similarly to Christopher Browning's 1992 book Ordinary Men, Kudryashov argued that the Trawniki men were examples of how ordinary people could become willing killers.

=== Murder operations ===
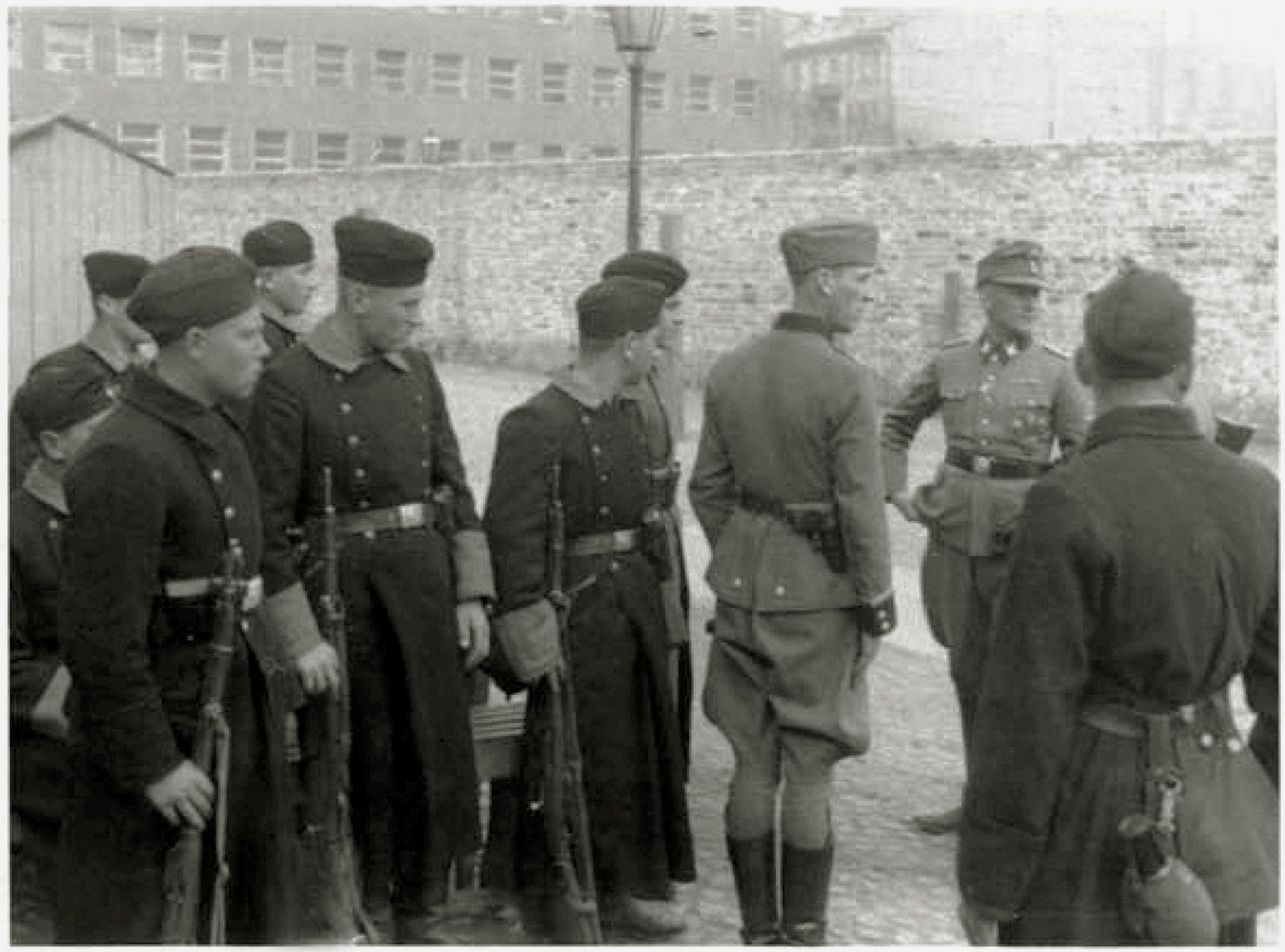
Stroop Report Trawniki shooters during the Warsaw Ghetto Uprising, with Jürgen Stroop (on the right), 1943 at the Umschlagplatz, with Stawki 5/7 in the back. Their military overcoats came from the Allgemeine-SS surplus no longer used by the German SS.

The Trawniki shooters were assigned to the worst of the "on-the-spot dirty work" by Hauptsturmführer Karl Streibel (wrote Browning), so the Germans from the parallel Reserve Police Battalion 101 of the Order Police from Hamburg "would not go crazy" from the horror of hands-on killing for hours or days on end. The Trawnikis used to arrive in squads numbering around 50 at the killing site, and start by sitting down to a sandwich and bottles of vodka from their knapsacks behaving like guests, while the Germans dealt with unruly crowds of thousands of ghetto inhabitants: as in Międzyrzec, Łuków, Radzyń, Parczew, Końskowola, Komarówka and all other locations. In one case, when the Trawniki men got too drunk to show up in Aleksandrów, Major Wilhelm Trapp ordered the release of prisoners rounded up for mass execution.

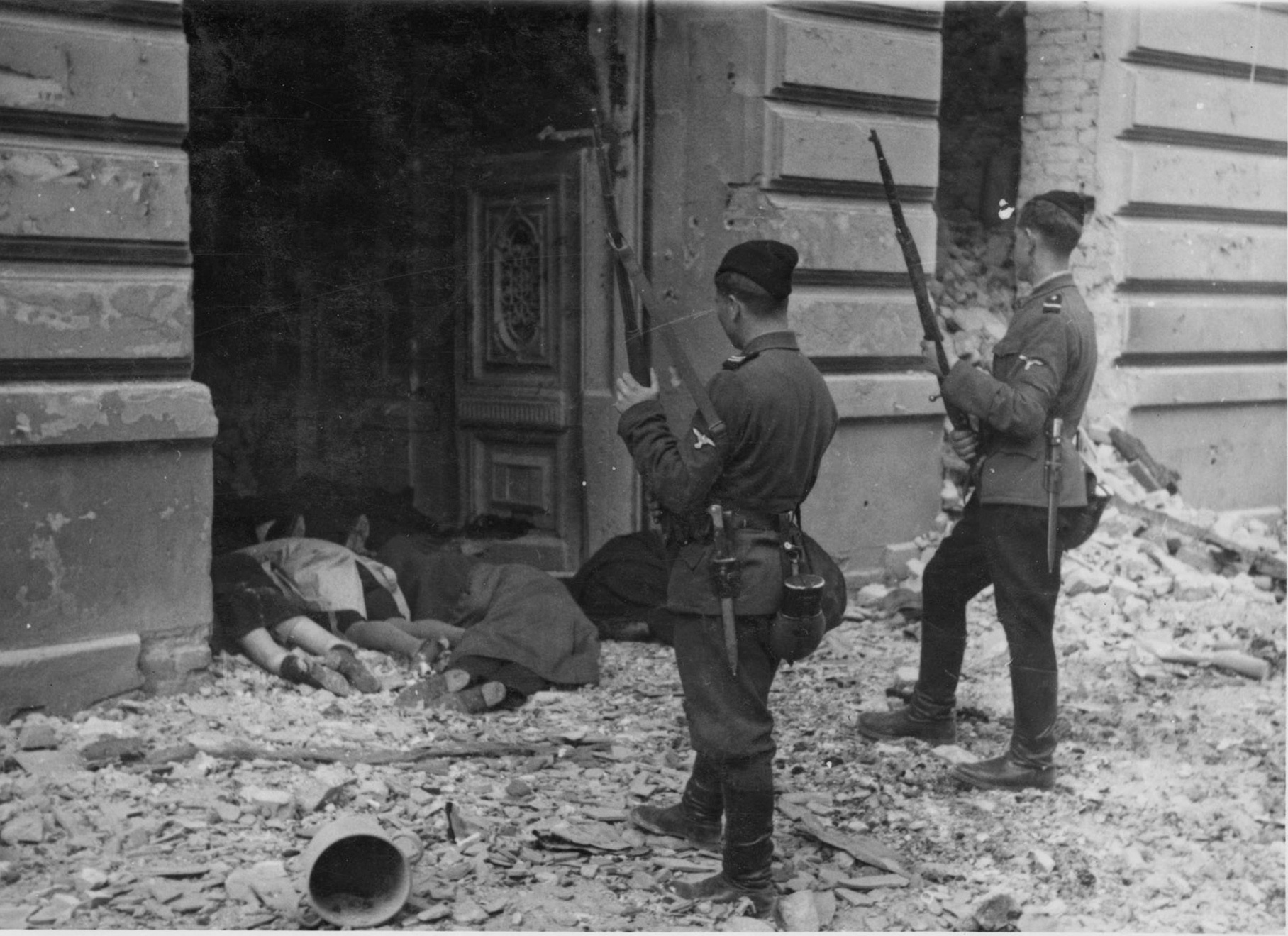
"Trawniki" men during the destruction of the Warsaw Ghetto at Zamenhofa 42 / Kupiecka 18.<. Photo from Jürgen Stroop Report, May 1943

The Trawniki men shot so fast and so wildly that the German policemen "frequently had to take cover to avoid being hit." Ukrainian Hiwis were perceived as indispensable. In Łomazy, the Germans were "overjoyed" to see them coming after the messy Józefów massacre which permanently traumatized the untrained executioners. The wave of mass killings of Jews from the Międzyrzec Podlaski Ghetto lasting non-stop for several days were conducted by the Trawniki battalion of about 350 to 400 men, same as in Parczew, or the Izbica Ghetto. The German unit had shot 4,600 Jews by September 1942, but only 78 ethnic Poles, "the poorest of the poor".

The SS-Gruppenführer Jürgen Stroop who was in charge of the suppression of the Warsaw Ghetto Uprising and the methodical destruction of the Ghetto itself – responsible for the massacre of over 50,000 Polish Jews – later remarked in a prison interview with Kazimierz Moczarski, published in his original Polish edition of the Conversations with an Executioner:

We used the word 'askaris' for the volunteers serving with our auxiliary forces in the SS, recruited from the indigenous populations in the areas acquired in Eastern Europe. They were, in principle, Latvians, Lithuanians, Belarusians and Ukrainians. They were trained at the 'SS-Ausbildungslager-Trawniki' near Lublin. They did not make the best of soldiers, although they were nationalists and anti-Semites. Young people, often without the elementary education, culturally savage, with inclination to cheating. But obedient, physically tough and steadfast against the enemy. Many 'askaris' we used during the 'Grossaktion' (especially in its initial stages) were Latvians. They did not understand Polish and therefore were unable to communicate with the people of Warsaw. This was exactly what we wanted. We also called them "Trawniki men".	Myśmy nazywali "askarisami" ochotników do służb pomocniczych w SS, którzy rekrutowali się z ludności autochtonicznej na terenach zdobytych w Europie Wschodniej. Byli to w zasadzie Łotysze, Litwini, Białorusini i Ukraińcy. Przeszkalano ich w SS-Ausbildungs-lager-Trawniki pod Lublinem. Nie najlepsi żołnierze, choć nacjonaliści i antysemici. Młodzi, bez podstawowego najczęściej wykształcenia, o kulturze dzikusów i skłonnościach do kantów. Ale posłuszni, wytrwali fizycznie i twardzi wobec wroga. Wielu "askarisów" użytych w Grossaktion (szczególnie we wstępnych działaniach) to Łotysze. Nie znali języka polskiego, więc trudno im się było porozumiewać z ludnością Warszawy. A o to nam szło. Nazywaliśmy ich również Trawniki-Männer.

Trawniki personnel was also used in the August 1943 suppression of the Białystok Ghetto Uprising, as well as the lesser-known Mizocz Ghetto uprising of October 1942 among similar others. In other locations, the lists compiled by the local Ukrainian Hilfsverwaltung enabled them to quickly and precisely identify their Jewish targets.

== End and post-war ==
The Trawniki training camp was dismantled in July 1944 because of the approaching frontline. The last 1,000 Hiwis forming the SS Battalion Streibel led by Karl Streibel himself, were transported west to still functioning death camps. The Jews of the adjacent Trawniki labor camp were massacred in November 1943 during Aktion Erntefest. Their exhumed bodies were incinerated in Sonderaktion 1005 by Sonderkommandos from Milejów who in turn were executed on site upon the completion of their task by the end of 1943. The Soviets entered the completely empty training facility on 23 July 1944. After the war, the Soviet authorities arrested and prosecuted hundreds, possibly as many as one thousand Hiwis who returned home. The more conservative number of trials given by Kudryashov is over 140 between 1944 and 1987. Those brought to trial in the Soviet Union were tried before both civilian courts and military tribunals. Almost all of those tried in the Soviet Union were convicted and some were executed. Most were sentenced to a Gulag, and released under the Khrushchev amnesty of 1955.

The number of Hiwis tried in the West was very small by comparison. Six defendants were acquitted on all charges and set free by a West German court in Hamburg in 1976 including commandant Streibel. The main difference between them and the Trawnikis apprehended in the Soviet Union was that the former claimed lack of awareness and left no live witnesses who could testify against them, while the latter were charged with treason and therefore were doomed from the start. In the U.S. some 16 former Hiwi guards were denaturalized.

== Known Trawnikis having served at death camps ==
The notoriety of crimes committed by Trawnikis at the extermination camps of Belzec [Be], Sobibor [So], and Treblinka [Tr] during Operation Reinhard have led to many specific names being publicized in postwar literature and by museums of the Holocaust, based on Jewish and Polish survivor-testimonies, memoirs, and archives. The long list of at least 234 names of camp guards written out phonetically can be attributed to more than a dozen sources in which they appear. They often feature arbitrary spellings in English and Polish translation (or transliteration from Cyrillic) based on memory alone, by which the perpetrators could not be legally identified. The following are the most notable of them, confirmed by the courts, and arranged in alphabetical order.

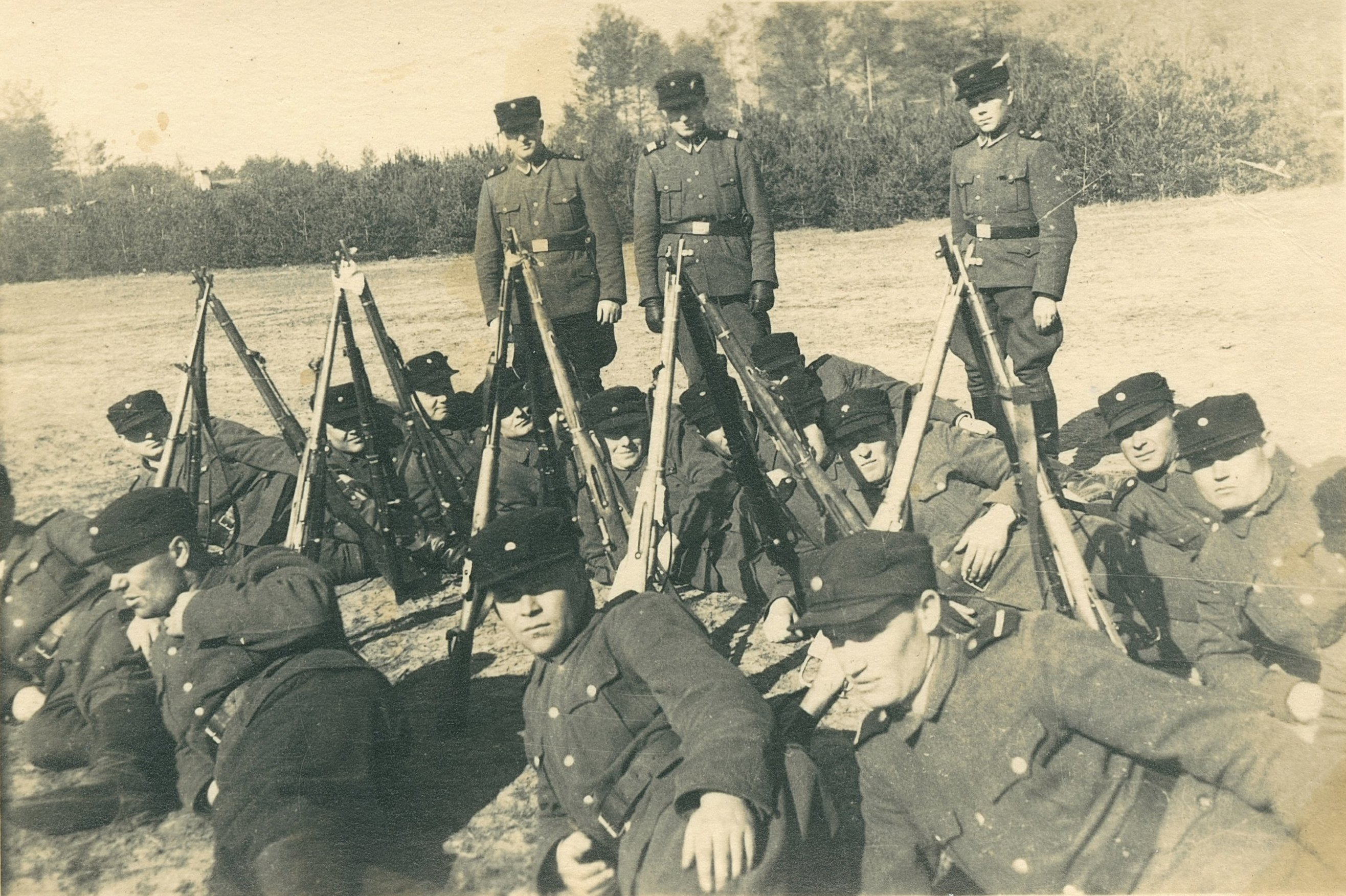
Picture of Trawniki guards at Sobibor, taken in 1943. Demjanjuk has been "inconclusively identified" as the guard who is front and center, lying on the ground

1. John Demjanjuk, a Ukrainian who joined the Trawniki men and served as a guard at Sobibor. Demnjanjuk immigrated to the United States, but was deported to Israel to stand trial as "Ivan the Terrible" in 1986. Demjanjuk was found guilty and sentenced to death, but his conviction was overturned by the Israeli Supreme Court after new evidence cast doubt on the identity of Demjanjuk as "Ivan the Terrible". In 2009, Demjanjuk was deported to Germany where he was convicted in 2011 for having been a guard at Sobibor.
2. Fedor Federenko (Fedorenko) [Tr], the Soviet POW recruited from Stalag 319 at Chełm, guard at the Jewish ghetto in Lublin, sent to Warsaw and to Treblinka death camp in September 1942. After the war Federenko settled in the US; he was extradited to the Soviet Union in December 1984. He was found guilty of treason, sentenced to death, and executed in 1987.
3. Josias Kumpf, a Yugoslav Volksdeutscher who took part in the murderous Aktion Erntefest at Trawniki, stripped of his US citizenship in 2005 and deported to Austria in March 2009. Escaped responsibility due to statute of limitations in that country.
4. Samuel Kunz [Be], former Soviet POW trained at Trawniki, charged in Bonn, Germany in July 2010 with being a Belzec camp guard. Kunz died in November 2010 before his trial.
5. Wasyl Lytwyn born 1921; ordered to be deported from the United States in December 1995; repatriated to Ukraine.
6. Ivan Mandycz born 1920; came to US in 1955; ordered deported 2005; Not deported because of age; died 2017
7. Ivan Ivanovych Marchenko aka Ivan the Terrible" [b.1911-d?][Tr] in the Red Army since 1941, brought to Trawniki from POW camp in Chełm, a guard at the Jewish ghetto in Lublin and in Treblinka together with Nikolay Shalayev who was tasked with forcing Jews into the gas chambers; the "motorists" cranking up the gas engine when asked to "turn on the water", called by the Jews "Ivan the Terrible" (Ivan Grozny), Marchenko exhibited special savagery during the killing process; photographed with Ivan Tkachuk at Treblinka. In 1943 he was transferred to Trieste, and in 1944 fled to Yugoslavia. Last seen in 1945. His fate is unknown and was never tried.
8. Jakiw Palij, (16 August 1923 - 10 January 2019) a Hiwi guard who was deported in the U.S. in 1949 and claimed to have worked on his father's farm, was stripped of his United States citizenship for having "made material misrepresentations in his application for a visa to immigrate to the United States". Deported from United States on 21 August 2018 at the age of 95. He later died on 10 January 2019, at the age of 95.
9. Jakob Reimer a.k.a. Jack Reimer, a Hiwi guard at Trawniki in 1944. Denaturalized in 2002; died in 2005 before he could be deported from the United States to Germany.
10. Nikolay Shalayev, a Hilfswilliger guard serving at Treblinka extermination camp. He was one of two Ukrainian guards (along with Ivan Marchenko) in charge of the motor that produced the exhaust fumes which were fed through pipes into the gas chambers during the killing process. Tried by the Soviets after the war for treason and sentenced to death.
11. Vladas Zajančkauskas, a Hiwi shooter deployed to participate in the annihilation of the Warsaw Ghetto; had his U.S. citizenship revoked in 2005 at the age of 90; at the time he was reported to be 95, but he was born in 1915. Died 2013, aged 97.
