= Karl Streibel =

German SS officer (1903–1986)

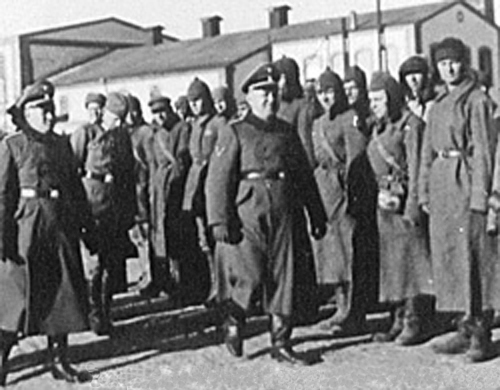
- Streibel at Trawniki (centre) inspects a company of Hiwis (some still wearing Soviet Budionovkas).
- Born: 11 October 1903; Neustadt, Silesia, German Empire
- Died: August 5, 1986 (aged 82); Hamburg, West Germany
- Military career
- Allegiance: Nazi Germany
- Branch: Schutzstaffel
- Service years: until 1945
- Rank: Sturmbannführer
- Unit: SS-Totenkopfverbände

Karl Streibel (11 October 1903 – 5 August 1986) was the second and last commander of the Trawniki concentration camp – one of the subcamps of the KL Lublin system of Nazi concentration camps in occupied Poland during World War II.

Streibel was born in Neustadt, Silesia (now Prudnik, Poland). He joined the NSDAP and the SS at the age of 29, in November 1932. He was promoted to Obersturmführer just before the Nazi German invasion of Poland. He was appointed leader of Trawniki by Globocnik on 27 October 1941 to conduct training of the collaborationist auxiliary police a.k.a. "Hiwis" (Hilfswilligen, lit. "those willing to help") for service with Nazi Germany in the General Government. His camp had also imprisoned Polish Jews condemned to slave labor. The Jews were all massacred in Operation Harvest Festival on 3 November 1943.

The Trawniki men (German: Trawnikimänner) took part in Operation Reinhard, the Nazi extermination of Jews from across occupied Europe. They conducted executions at extermination camps and in Jewish ghettos including Belzec, Sobibor, Treblinka II, Warsaw (three times, see Stroop Report), Częstochowa, Lublin, Lwów, Radom, Kraków, Białystok (twice), Majdanek as well as at Auschwitz, not to mention Trawniki itself, and the remaining subcamps of KL Lublin/Majdanek including Poniatowa, Budzyn, Kraśnik, Puławy, Lipowa, but also during massacres in Łomazy, Międzyrzec, Łuków, Radzyń, Parczew, Końskowola, Komarówka and all other locations, augmented by the SS and the Reserve Police Battalion 101 from Ordnungspolizei (Orpo).

== A free man ==
On 24 June 1944, Streibel escaped from Trawniki with his own SS Battalion Streibel toward Kraków and Auschwitz, ahead of the Soviet offensive. They retreated again through Poland and Czechoslovakia to Dresden, Germany, where his battalion was disbanded between 4 March and 12 April 1945. Streibel and his Hiwis blended in with the civilian population and disappeared from sight.

Nothing was known about his whereabouts until his indictment in 1970. Streibel was put on trial in Hamburg for his wartime activities, and in 1976 acquitted of any wrongdoing and set free. German prosecutor Helge Grabitz believed his word, but also granted him partial memory impairment. Streibel was declared innocent of inciting violence; without prosecution right of appeal. Further accounts of his life appear missing. According to historian Dieter Pohl, Streibel died in Hamburg in 1986.
