= Reserve Police Battalion 101 =

- Active: Founded 1939; Enlarged 6 May 1940
- Country: occupied Poland
- Allegiance: Nazi Germany
- Type: Order Police battalion under Schutzstaffel (SS) command
- Role: Criminal policing then expulsion of Poles, liquidation of ghettos, mass murder of Jews

Commanders
- Commander: Wilhelm Trapp

Reserve Police Battalion 101 (German: Reserve-Polizei-Bataillon 101) was a Nazi German paramilitary formation of the uniformed police force known as the Ordnungspolizei (Order Police, Orpo), the organization formed by the Nazi unification of the civilian police forces in the country in 1936, placed under the leadership of the Schutzstaffel (SS) and grouped into battalions in 1939. One of many such Nazi German Order Police battalions, Reserve-Polizei-Bataillon 101 (RPB 101) was formed in Hamburg and was deployed in September 1939 along with the German armed forces (Wehrmacht) in the invasion of Poland.

RPB 101 guarded Polish prisoners of war and carried out expulsion of Poles, called "resettlement actions", in the new Warthegau territory around Poznań and Łódź. Following a personnel change and retraining from May 1941 until June 1942, it became a major perpetrator of the Holocaust in occupied Poland. The battalion gained attention from the public due to the work of the historians Christopher Browning and Daniel Goldhagen.

== History ==
Between 1939 and 1945, the Ordnungspolizei maintained battalion formations, trained and equipped by their main police offices in Germany. Their duties varied widely from unit to unit and from one year to another, but one task was that of civilian repression in the conquered or colonized countries. After the German invasion of the Soviet Union in Operation Barbarossa of 1941, the Order Police joined the SS Einsatzgruppen in the massacres of Jews. The first mass-murder of 3,000 Jews by the German police occurred in Białystok on 12 July 1941, followed by the Bloody Sunday massacre of 10,000–12,000 Jews by Reserve Police Battalion 133, perpetrated in Stanisławów (now Ivano-Frankivsk, Ukraine) on 12 October 1941 with the aid of Sicherheitspolizei (SiPo) and Ukrainian Auxiliary Police.

The shootings in the USSR-proper culminated in the Reserve Police Battalion 45 massacre of 33,000 Jews at Babi Yar. The Order Police battalions became indispensable in the implementation of the Final Solution after the Wannsee Conference of 1942. They rounded up tens of thousands of Nazi ghetto inmates for deportations to extermination camps during the liquidation of the Jewish ghettos in German-occupied Poland, and participated in the murder of Polish Jews along with the Holocaust executioners known as Trawnikis. During Operation Reinhard mass murders were committed by Battalion 101 against women, children and the elderly in places including forced-labour camps and subcamps, most notably during the Aktion Erntefest of 1943, the largest German massacre of Jews in the war, with 42,000 victims shot in the execution pits over the bodies of others.

== Battalion 101 operations ==
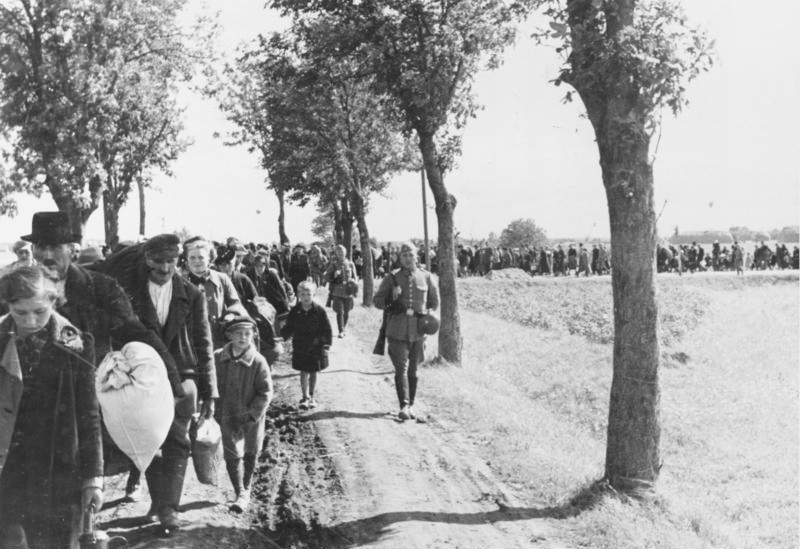
Expulsion from Warthegau. Poles led to cattle trains as part of the ethnic cleansing of western Poland, using Battalion 101

A total of 17 Order Police battalions participated in the invasion of Poland in 1939. Battalion 101 was one of three from the city of Hamburg. After a few months of active duty the battalion was transported from Kielce, Poland, back to Germany on 17 December 1939 to undergo a major expansion after Christmas. Servicemen were tasked with organizing additional ground units. The already enlarged battalion was deployed to Poland again in May 1940, and for the next five months, conducted mass expulsions of Poles to make room for the German colonists brought in Heim ins Reich from the areas invaded by their Moscow ally as well as from Nazi Germany.

The expulsions of Poles, along with kidnappings of Polish children for the purpose of Germanization, were managed by two German institutions, VoMi, and RKFDV under Heinrich Himmler. In settlements already cleared of their native Polish inhabitants, the new Volksdeutsche from Bessarabia, Romania and the Baltics were put, under the banner of Lebensraum. Battalion 101 "evacuated" 36,972 Poles in one action, over half of the targeted number of 58,628 in the new German district of Warthegau (the total was 630,000 by the war's end, with two-thirds of the victims being murdered), but also committed murders among civilians according to postwar testimonies of at least one of its former members.

During the early period we endeavored to fetch all people out of the houses, without regard for whether they were old, sick, or small children. The commission quickly found fault with our procedures. They objected that we struggled under the burden of the old and sick. To be precise, they did not initially give us the order to shoot them on the spot, rather they contented themselves with making it clear to us that nothing could be done with such people. — Bruno Probst

For the next half-year, beginning 28 November 1940, Police Battalion 101 guarded the new ghetto in Łódź, eventually crammed with 160,000 Jews. The Łódź Ghetto was the second-largest Jewish ghetto of World War II after the Warsaw Ghetto where the policemen from Battalion 61 held victory parties on the days when a large number of desperate prisoners were shot at the ghetto fence. Battalion 101, commanded by career policeman Major Wilhelm Trapp, returned to Hamburg in May 1941 and again the more experienced servicemen were dispatched to organize more units. New battalions, numbered 102, 103, and 104, were formed by them and prepared for duty. Training of new reservists included escort duty of 3,740 Hamburg and Bremen Jews deported to the East to be murdered. Meanwhile, the murder of Jews from the Łódź Ghetto using gas vans began at Chełmno in December 1941.

=== Return to Poland, June 1942 – November 1943 ===
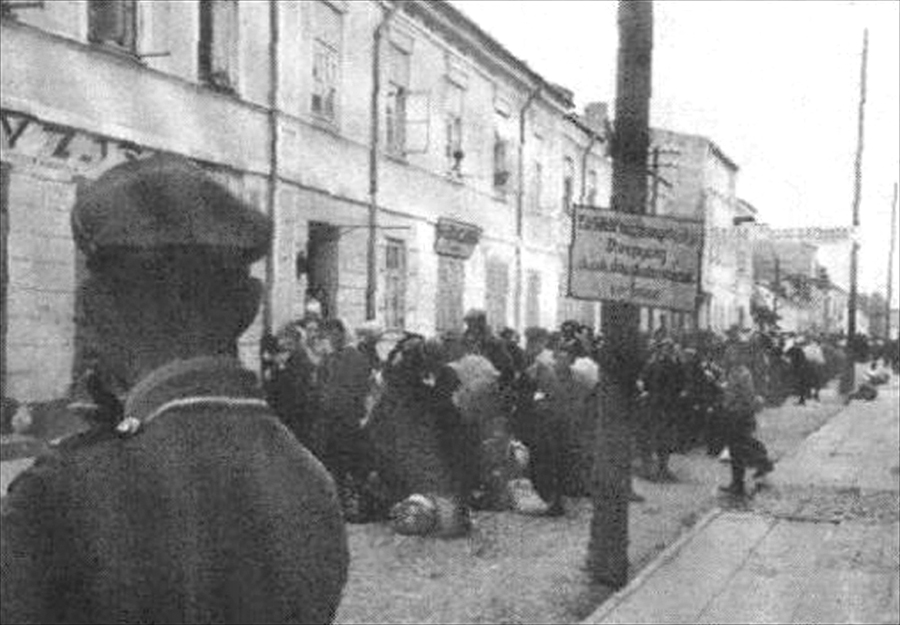
Reserve Police Battalion 101 conducting a "liquidation" in the ghetto of Biała Podlaska

The Reserve Battalion 101 composed of 500 men in their thirties, who were too old for the regular army, returned to occupied Poland with three heavy machine-gun detachments in June 1942. By that time, the first two extermination camps of Operation Reinhard in General Government – Bełżec and Sobibor – were already gassing trainloads of Jews from all over Europe. The most deadly of them, Treblinka, was about to start operations. Globocnik gave Battalion 101 the task of deporting Jews from across Lublin reservation. Between mid-March and mid-April 1942, about 90% of the 40,000 prisoners of the Lublin Ghetto were loaded by Order Police and Schupo onto trains destined for Bełżec extermination camp. Another 11,000–12,000 Jews were deported from ghettos in Izbica, Piaski, in Lubartów, Zamość and Kraśnik with the aid one of the Trawniki battalions of Karl Streibel.

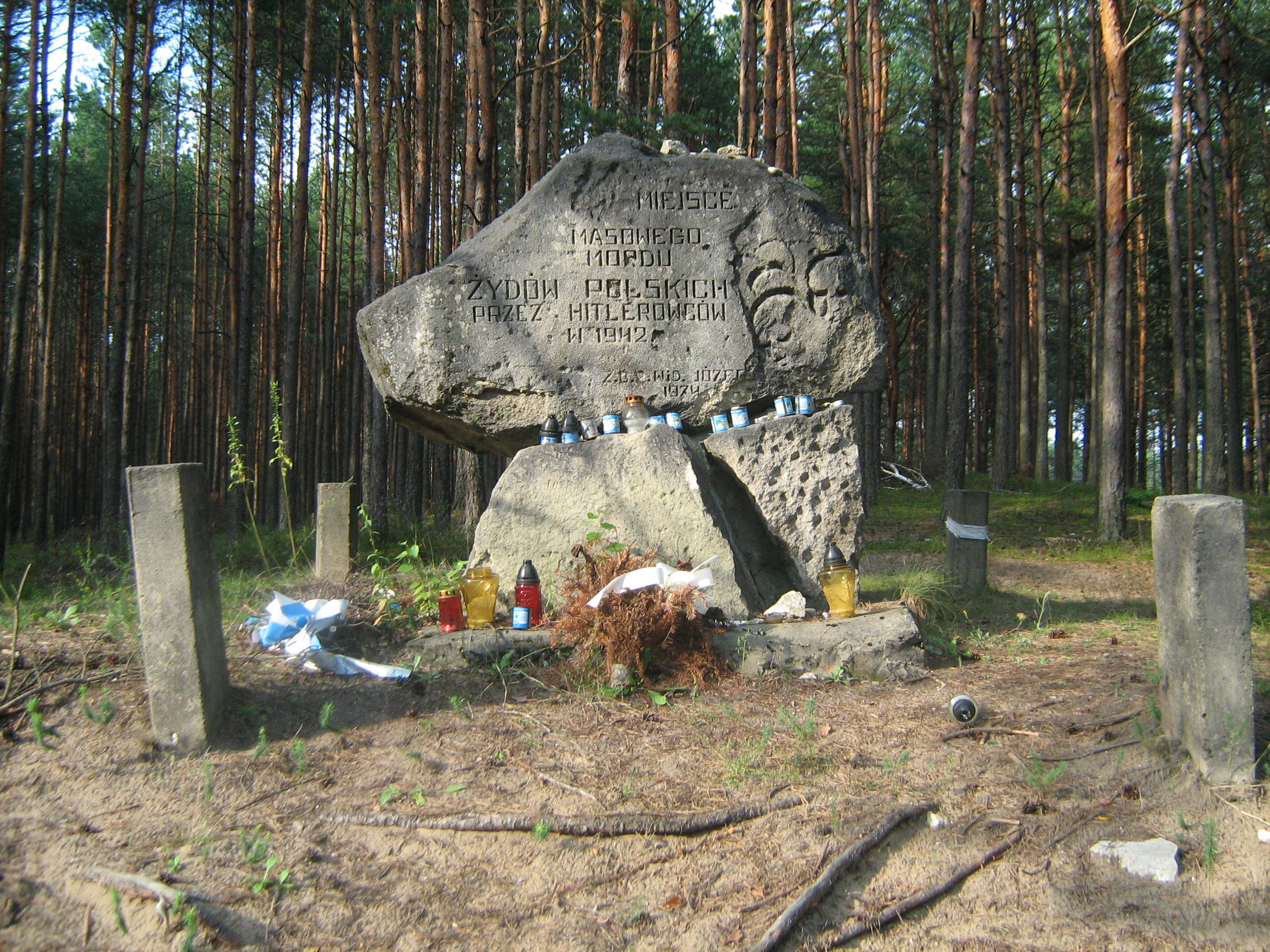
Memorial in the forest of Winiarczykowa Góra near Józefów, southeast of Biłgoraj, commemorating the Jewish victims of the 1942 massacre committed by the Reserve Police Battalion 101.

The first mass murder known to have been committed entirely by Reserve Police Battalion 101 was the most "messy" for lack of training; uniforms dripping wet with brain matter and blood. The murder of 1,500 Jews from Józefów ghetto, approximately 100 km (62 mi) south of Lublin in south-eastern Poland, on 13 July 1942 was performed mostly by the three platoons of the Second Company. Prior to departure from Biłgoraj, they were given large amounts of extra ammunition. A generous supply of alcohol was procured. An opportunity was provided before the mission to back out but only twelve out of 500 policemen did so. The American historian, Christopher Browning, argues that this was due to pressures for conformity. Most of the men did not want to separate themselves from their comrades and be seen as weak or cowardly. Later in the massacre, many men felt unable to continue shooting at point-blank range of prisoners begging for mercy and asked to wait at the marketplace where the trucks were loaded. Luxembourgish police trainees in RPB 101 escorted young Jewish prisoners from Józefów to the local railway station in Zwierzyniec selected for slave work in KL Lublin. The action was finished in seventeen hours. The bodies of their victims carpeting the forest floor at the Winiarczykowa Góra hill (about 2 km (1.2 mi) from the village, pictured) were left unburied. Watches, jewellery and money were taken. The battalion left for Biłgoraj at 9 pm. Only a dozen Jews are known to have survived the slaughter. Two members of the Mart family from the German minority residing in Józefów were shot by Polish underground later for collaboration with the Germans.

The next ghetto liquidation action took place less than a month later in Łomazy lacking a rail line. The infants, the old, and the infirm were shot by Battalion 101 during the early morning round-ups on 17 August 1942. Later that day, the Hiwi shooters arrived at the main square, and some 1,700 ghetto prisoners were marched on foot to the Hały forest outside the town, where the stronger Jewish men prepared a trench with entrance on one side. The Jews were stripped naked and shot, the killings taking until 7:00 p.m. The Ukrainian Trawnikis got so drunk that the policemen from the first, second and third platoons (Lieutenant Hartwig Gnade) had to continue shooting by themselves in half a metre of groundwater and blood.

=== More deportations ===
In the following weeks, Police Battalion 101 was active in towns with direct lines to Treblinka and therefore mass shootings were not used. On 19 August 1942 – only two days after Łomazy – 3,000 Jews were deported from Parczew (2,000 more several days later); from Międzyrzec 11,000 Jews were sent to Treblinka on 25–26 August amid gunfire and screams. From Radzyń 6,000 prisoners, then from Łuków (7,000), Końskowola (2,000 coupled with the massacre at the hospital), Komarówka, Tomaszów; all those unable to move or attempting to flee were shot on the spot. At the end of August, death transports were temporarily halted. After a respite, shootings of Jews resumed on 22 September in Serokomla, then in Talczyn and in the Kock ghetto four days later, by the Second Company. In Izbica, the makeshift ghetto reached a breaking point packed by Gnade with Jewish inhabitants of Biała Podlaska, Komarówka, Wohyń, and Czemierniki. The October and November deportations to Bełżec and Sobibór led to a week of mass killings at the cemetery, beginning on 2 November 1942. Several thousand Jews (estimated at 4,500) from the transit ghetto were massacred by the Sonderdienst battalion of Ukrainian Trawnikis under police control in an assembly-line manner and dumped in hastily excavated mass graves. All men drank heavily.

In Międzyrzec the "strip-search" of young Jewish women was introduced by Gnade before executions dubbed "mopping up" actions by the Germans. Gnade's first sergeant later said: "I must say that First Lieutenant Gnade gave me the impression that the entire business afforded him a great deal of pleasure." By the spring of 1943 most towns of the Lublin reservation were Judenfrei therefore the battalion was tasked with "Jew hunts" in the deep local forests, or in the potato fields and around distant farmlands. Thousands of Jews were shot at point-blank range.

The participation of Reserve Police Battalion 101 in the Final Solution culminated in the Aktion Erntefest massacres of Jews imprisoned at the Trawniki, Poniatowa and Majdanek concentration camps with subcamps in Budzyn, Kraśnik, Puławy, Lipowa and other slave-labor projects of the Ostindustrie (Osti). Approximately 43,000 Jews were killed. It was the largest single-day massacre of the Holocaust under direct German occupation, committed on 3 November 1943 on the orders of Christian Wirth. Trawniki men provided the necessary manpower.

At the conclusion of the Erntefest massacres, the district of Lublin was for all practical purposes judenfrei. The murderous participation of Reserve Police Battalion 101 in the Final Solution came to an end... For a battalion of less than 500 men, the ultimate body count was at least 83,000 Jews.

== Postwar history ==
Soon after the war ended, Major Wilhelm Trapp was captured by the British authorities and placed at the Neuengamme Internment Camp. After questioning by the Polish Military Mission for the Investigations of War Crimes in October 1946, he was extradited to Poland along with Drewes, Bumann and Kadler. Trapp was charged with war crimes by the Siedlce District Court, sentenced to death on 6 July 1948 and executed by hanging on 18 December 1948 along with Gustav Drewes. With the start of the Cold War, West Germany did not pursue war criminals for the next twenty years. In 1964 several men were arrested. For the first time, the involvement of German police from Hamburg in wartime massacres was investigated by the West German prosecutors. In 1968 after a two-year trial three men got 8 years imprisonment, one 6 years and one 5 years. Six other policemen – all lower ranks – were found guilty but not sentenced. The rest lived their normal lives.

== Summary of genocidal missions ==
For the most part, the following table is based on the 1968 verdict of the Hamburg District Court and compared with data from the Museum of the History of the Polish Jews and other searchable databases.

Murder operations of the Reserve Police Battalion 101 in occupied Poland
Location	Date	Operation type and participants	Jewish victims
Józefów	July 1942	Mass shooting / entire battalion	1,500
Łomazy	August 1942	Mass shooting / 2nd Company, Hiwis	1,700
Parczew	August 1942	Extermination, death trains / 1st & 2nd Company, Hiwis	5,000
Międzyrzec Podlaski Ghetto	August 1942	Extermination / 1st Co., 3rd Pl. 2nd Co., 1st Pl. 3rd Co., Hiwis	12,000
Radzyń	October 1942	Extermination, death trains /1st Company, Hiwis	2,000
Parczew	October 1942	Mass shooting / 1st & 2nd Company, Hiwis	5,000
Biała Podlaska & its county	October & November 1942	Międzyrzec Ghetto extermination, death trains	10,800
Komarówka	October & November 1942	Międzyrzec Ghetto	600
Wohyń	October & November 1942	Międzyrzec Ghetto	800
Czemierniki	October & November 1942	Międzyrzec Ghetto	1,000
Radzyń	October & November 1942	Extermination, death trains	2,000
Międzyrzec Ghetto	October & November 1942	Death camps	15,200
Międzyrzec Ghetto	May 1943	Death camps; Majdanek, Treblinka	3,000
Aktion Erntefest	3 November 1943	Two days of mass shooting / entire battalion	43,000
Total	July 1942 – November 1943	Battalion 101 in occupied Poland	(83,000)

== Commanders ==
Upon its return to occupied Poland, on 12 June 1942, Reserve Police Battalion 101 had this command structure

- 1st Company: Captain, Hauptsturmführer Julius Wohlauf (until October 1942, then Captain Steidtmann)

- 1st Platoon: Second Lieutenant Boysen
- 2nd Platoon: Reserve Second Lieutenant Bumann
- 3rd Platoon: Zugwachmeister Junge

- 2nd Company: Oberleutnant Hartwig Gnade (until May 1943, then Lieutenant Dreyer)

- 1st Platoon: Second Lieutenant Schürer
- 2nd Platoon: Reserve Second Lieutenant Kurt Dreyer
- 3rd Platoon: Hauptwachmeister Starke

- 3rd Company: Captain Wolfgang Hoffmann (until November 1942)

- 1st Platoon: Second Lieutenant Pauly
- 2nd Platoon: Second Lieutenant Hachmeister
- 3rd Platoon: Hauptwachmeister Jückmann
