= Timeline of Treblinka extermination camp =

This article presents the timeline of events at Treblinka extermination camp during the most deadly phase of the Holocaust in World War II. All deportations were from German occupied Poland, except where noted. In most cases the number of deportees are not exact figures, but rather approximations.

Days are listed in chronological order, nevertheless, a number of dates are missing from the below tables which means only that no waybills survived for those particular dates. It does not mean that transports were not arriving or were not processed from layover yards, when applicable.

== Day-by-day ==
Day #	Day of week	Date	Number of deportees	Deported from	Cumulative total deportees	Known deportees	Major Events
	Tuesday	July 7, 1942					Commandant Irmfried Eberl writes to Heinz Auerswald that Treblinka will be ready to start operations on July 11, 1942.
1	Wednesday	July 22, 1942	6,500	Warsaw Ghetto	6,500		First deportation from Warsaw Ghetto.
2	Thursday	July 23, 1942	7,300	Warsaw	13,800	Leon Finkelstein	Treblinka becomes fully operational.
3	Friday	July 24, 1942	7,400	Warsaw	21,200		
4	Saturday	July 25, 1942	7,530	Warsaw	28,730		
5	Sunday	July 26, 1942	6,400	Warsaw	35,130		
6	Monday	July 27, 1942	6,320	Warsaw	41,450		
7	Tuesday	July 28, 1942	5,020	Warsaw	46,470		
8	Wednesday	July 29, 1942	5,480	Warsaw	51,950		
9	Thursday	July 30, 1942	6,430	Warsaw	58,380		
10	Friday	July 31, 1942	6,756	Warsaw	65,136		
11	Saturday	August 1, 1942	6,220	Warsaw	71,356		
12	Sunday	August 2, 1942	6,276	Warsaw	77,632		
13	Monday	August 3, 1942	6,458	Warsaw	84,090		
14	Tuesday	August 4, 1942	6,568	Warsaw	90,658		
15	Wednesday	August 5, 1942	6,623	Warsaw	97,281	Hillel Zeitlin	
15	Wednesday	August 5, 1942	30,000	Radom Ghetto	127,281	First train of ghetto liquidation action lasting for two weeks with cumulative number of victims.	
16	Thursday	August 6, 1942	10,085	Warsaw	137,366	Janusz Korczak and 200 orphans	Fahrplananordnung Nr. 548; Warsaw – Treblinka. One of many:
17	Friday	August 7, 1942	10,672	Warsaw	148,038	A German food giveaway creates a backlog at the loading ramp. Four transports in two days cannot accommodate all the people lining up at the Umschlagplatz for the promised bread, some over several days, such was the hunger.	
18	Saturday	August 8, 1942	7,304	Warsaw	155,342	A German food giveaway creates a backlog at the loading ramp. Four transports in two days cannot accommodate all the people lining up at the Umschlagplatz for the promised bread, some over several days, such was the hunger.	
19	Sunday	August 9, 1942	6,292	Warsaw	161,634	A German food giveaway creates a backlog at the loading ramp. Four transports in two days cannot accommodate all the people lining up at the Umschlagplatz for the promised bread, some over several days, such was the hunger.	
20	Monday	August 10, 1942	2,158	Warsaw	163,792	A German food giveaway creates a backlog at the loading ramp. Four transports in two days cannot accommodate all the people lining up at the Umschlagplatz for the promised bread, some over several days, such was the hunger.	
21	Tuesday	August 11, 1942	7,725	Warsaw	171,517		
22	Wednesday	August 12, 1942	4,688	Warsaw	176,205	Luba Lewin	
23	Thursday	August 13, 1942	4,313	Warsaw	180,518		
24	Friday	August 14, 1942	5,168	Warsaw	185,686	Hanna Katznelson	
25	Saturday	August 15, 1942	3,633	Warsaw	189,319		
26	Sunday	August 16, 1942	4,095	Warsaw	193,414		
27	Monday	August 17, 1942	4,160	Warsaw	197,574		
28	Tuesday	August 18, 1942	3,926	Warsaw	201,500		
29	Wednesday	August 19, 1942	4,000	Warsaw	205,500		
29	Wednesday	August 19, 1942	6,500	Falenica	212,000		
29	Wednesday	August 19, 1942	7,000	Otwock	219,000		
29	Wednesday	August 19, 1942	1,800	Rembertów	220,800		
29	Wednesday	August 19, 1942	3,000	Jadwisin	223,800		
29	Wednesday	August 19, 1942	3,000	Radzymin	226,800		
29	Wednesday	August 19, 1942	2,200	Wołomin	229,000		
29	Wednesday	August 19, 1942	700	Jadów	229,700		
29	Wednesday	August 19, 1942	5,500	Parczew	235,200		
30	Thursday	August 20, 1942	4,000	Warsaw	239,200		
30	Thursday	August 20, 1942	21,000	Kielce	260,200		
31	Friday	August 21, 1942	3,000	Warsaw	263,200		
31	Friday	August 21, 1942	6,120	Mińsk Mazowiecki Ghetto closure	269,320		
32	Saturday	August 22, 1942	3,000	Warsaw	272,320		
32	Saturday	August 22, 1942	5,000	Siedlce	277,320		
32	Saturday	August 22, 1942	3,500	Łosice	280,820		
32	Saturday	August 22, 1942	3,800	Mordy	284,620		
33	Sunday	August 23, 1942	3,000	Warsaw	287,620	Jankiel Wiernik	
34	Monday	August 24, 1942	3,000	Warsaw	290,620		
35	Tuesday	August 25, 1942	3,002	Warsaw	293,622	Abraham Krzepicki	
35	Tuesday	August 25, 1942	11,000	Międzyrzec Podlaski Ghetto	304,622	Abraham Goldfarb	Fahrplananordnung Nr. 562; Międzyrzec – Treblinka
36	Wednesday	August 26, 1942	3,000	Warsaw	307,622	Odilo Globocnik, Christian Wirth and Josef Oberhauser visit Treblinka. Irmfried Eberl is relieved of command.	
37	Thursday	August 27, 1942	2,454	Warsaw	310,076		53,750 Warsaw Jews have been deported in the past 15 days.
38	Friday	August 28, 1942	Unknown	Łuków	Fahrplananordnung Nr. 565; Łuków – Treblinka. Odilo Globocnik temporarily suspends deportations to Treblinka. The gas chambers have continually broken down and the burial pits are overflowing with bodies. The SS resorts to shooting incoming Jews in the arrival area of the camp and piling bodies throughout the camp. In August, Globocnik orders Franz Stangl, commandant of Sobibor, to replace Dr. Irmfried Eberl as commandant of Treblinka. Stangl restores order in the camp and supervises the building of new gas chambers, which are operational in early autumn 1942. Transports of Warsaw and Radom Jews begin to arrive again in September 1942.		
41	Monday	August 31, 1942					Commandant Irmfried Eberl leaves Treblinka.
42	Tuesday	September 1, 1942			Franz Stangl becomes Commandant of Treblinka II. New, larger gas chambers have been erected to augment older chambers, and commence use. The new chambers are able to kill 12,000 to 15,000 victims every day, with the maximum capacity of 22,000 executions in 24 hours.		
44	Thursday	September 3, 1942	4,609	Warsaw	314,685	Boris Weinberg	Warsaw deportations are restarted. New arrivals are processed the next morning.
45	Friday	September 4, 1942	1,669	Warsaw	316,354	Kalman and Tema Taigman	
47	Sunday	September 6, 1942	3,634	Warsaw	319,988		
48	Monday	September 7, 1942	6,840	Warsaw	326,828		
49	Tuesday	September 8, 1942	13,596	Warsaw	340,424		
50	Wednesday	September 9, 1942	6,616	Warsaw	347,040		
50	Wednesday	September 9, 1942	Unknown	Częstochowa Ghetto		Pinchas Epstein	
51	Thursday	September 10, 1942	5,199	Warsaw	352,239		
52	Friday	September 11, 1942	5,000	Warsaw	357,239	Jewish-Argentinian inmate Meir Berliner stabs SS-Oberscharführer Max Biala to death in a planned attack. Berliner is then executed by camp officers.	
53	Saturday	September 12, 1942	4,806	Warsaw	362,045		Abraham Krzepicki escapes.
56	Tuesday	September 15, 1942	6,000	Kałuszyn	368,045		
56	Tuesday	September 15, 1942	1,000	Kołbiel	369,045		
56	Tuesday	September 15, 1942	1,000	Mrozy/Kuflew	370,045		
56	Tuesday	September 15, 1942	700	Siennica	370,745		
56	Tuesday	September 15, 1942	700	Stanisławów	371,445		
56	Tuesday	September 15, 1942	1,000?	Gniewoszów HMM	372,445		
57	Wednesday	September 16, 1942	6,000	Jędrzejów	378,445		
57	Wednesday	September 16, 1942	1,000	Sędziszów	379,445		Fahrplananordnung Nr. 587; Sędziszów – Treblinka
57	Wednesday	September 16, 1942	1,500	Szczekociny	380,945		
57	Wednesday	September 16, 1942	5,000	Włoszczowa	385,945		
57	Wednesday	September 16, 1942	3,000	Wodzisław	388,945		
62	Monday	September 21, 1942	2,196	Warsaw	391,141	The last transport from the Polish capital. It includes Jewish police forced to help with deportations throughout Grossaktion Warsaw, and their families.	
62	Monday	September 21, 1942	2,500	Skarżysko-Kamienna	393,641		
62	Monday	September 21, 1942	4,000	Suchedniów	397,641		
62	Monday	September 21, 1942	sums to 40,000	Częstochowa Ghetto			Fahrplananordnung Nr. 594; Częstochowa – Treblinka (one of many consecutive transports). The Ghetto clearing took place in three weeks between September 21, 1942, and October 8, 1942. Some 7,000 Jews were deported to Treblinka on this day. Members of the Judenrat were sent from Częstochowa on October 4, 1942 (see below).
63	Tuesday	September 22, 1942	5,800	Sokołów Podlaski	403,441	Itka Wlos	Fahrplananordnung Nr. 594; Częstochowa – Treblinka (one of many consecutive transports). The Ghetto clearing took place in three weeks between September 21, 1942, and October 8, 1942. Some 7,000 Jews were deported to Treblinka on this day. Members of the Judenrat were sent from Częstochowa on October 4, 1942 (see below).
63	Tuesday	September 22, 1942	8,300	Węgrów	411,741		Fahrplananordnung Nr. 594; Częstochowa – Treblinka (one of many consecutive transports). The Ghetto clearing took place in three weeks between September 21, 1942, and October 8, 1942. Some 7,000 Jews were deported to Treblinka on this day. Members of the Judenrat were sent from Częstochowa on October 4, 1942 (see below).
63	Tuesday	September 22, 1942	1,100	Kosów Lacki	412,841		Fahrplananordnung Nr. 594; Częstochowa – Treblinka (one of many consecutive transports). The Ghetto clearing took place in three weeks between September 21, 1942, and October 8, 1942. Some 7,000 Jews were deported to Treblinka on this day. Members of the Judenrat were sent from Częstochowa on October 4, 1942 (see below).
63	Tuesday	September 22, 1942	1,100	Sterdyń	413,941		Fahrplananordnung Nr. 594; Częstochowa – Treblinka (one of many consecutive transports). The Ghetto clearing took place in three weeks between September 21, 1942, and October 8, 1942. Some 7,000 Jews were deported to Treblinka on this day. Members of the Judenrat were sent from Częstochowa on October 4, 1942 (see below).
63	Tuesday	September 22, 1942	2,000	Stoczek	415,941		Fahrplananordnung Nr. 594; Częstochowa – Treblinka (one of many consecutive transports). The Ghetto clearing took place in three weeks between September 21, 1942, and October 8, 1942. Some 7,000 Jews were deported to Treblinka on this day. Members of the Judenrat were sent from Częstochowa on October 4, 1942 (see below).
64	Wednesday	September 23, 1942	10,000	Szydłowiec	425,941	Fahrplananordnung Nr. 587 (one of many)	
67	Saturday	September 26, 1942	5,000	Siedlce	430,941		
67	Saturday	September 26, 1942	4,800	Biała Podlaska	435,741		
68	Sunday	September 27, 1942	1,240	Łaskarzew	436,981		Fahrplananordnung Nr. 587
68	Sunday	September 27, 1942	13,000	Kozienice	449,981		Fahrplananordnung Nr. 587
70	Tuesday	September 29, 1942	10,000?	Zwoleń	459,981		
72	Thursday	October 1, 1942	2,000	Busko-Zdrój	461,981		
72	Thursday	October 1, 1942	8,000	Chmielnik	469,981		
72	Thursday	October 1, 1942	4,000	Nowy Korczyn	473,981		
72	Thursday	October 1, 1942	3,000	Pacanów	476,981		
72	Thursday	October 1, 1942	3,000	Pińczów	479,981		
72	Thursday	October 1, 1942	2,000	Radzyń	481,981		
73	Friday	October 2, 1942	3,440	Parysów	485,421		
73	Friday	October 2, 1942	3,680	Sobienie-Jeziory	489,101		
73	Friday	October 2, 1942	1,640	Sobolew	490,741		
73	Friday	October 2, 1942	10,000	Żelechów	500,741		
75	Sunday	October 4, 1942	continuing	Częstochowa Ghetto			
76	Monday	October 5, 1942	7,000	Łuków	507,741	Transports unnumbered. Brothers Zygmunt & Oskar Strawczyński arrive from the Łódź Ghetto. Both escape successfully during the uprising; Oskar wrote down his groundbreaking Ten Months in Treblinka in 1943 while in hiding with the Polish rescuers.	
76	Monday	October 5, 1942	1,000	Terezín Ghetto, now Czech Republic	508,741	Transports unnumbered. Brothers Zygmunt & Oskar Strawczyński arrive from the Łódź Ghetto. Both escape successfully during the uprising; Oskar wrote down his groundbreaking Ten Months in Treblinka in 1943 while in hiding with the Polish rescuers.	
76	Monday	October 5, 1942	continuing	Częstochowa Ghetto	548,741	Transports unnumbered. Brothers Zygmunt & Oskar Strawczyński arrive from the Łódź Ghetto. Both escape successfully during the uprising; Oskar wrote down his groundbreaking Ten Months in Treblinka in 1943 while in hiding with the Polish rescuers.	
77	Tuesday	October 6, 1942	800	Żarki	549,541		
77	Tuesday	October 6, 1942	Unknown	Międzyrzec Podlaski Ghetto			
78	Wednesday	October 7, 1942	1,600	Koniecpol	551,141		
78	Wednesday	October 7, 1942	2,000	Łagów	553,141		
79	Thursday	October 8, 1942	1,000	Terezín Ghetto, now Czech Republic	554,141	Richard Glazar, Karl Unger, Rudolf Masarek	
81	Saturday	October 10, 1942	14,000	Radomsko	568,141		
82	Sunday	October 11, 1942	11,000	Ostrowiec Świętokrzyski	579,141		
86	Thursday	October 15, 1942	22,000	Piotrków Ghetto	601,141	The "Aktion" at Piotrków lasted for eight days beginning October 14, 1942. The total of 22,000 prisoners were split into four transports which included Jews expelled to Piotrków from Kamieńsk, Przygłów, Sulejów, Srock, Tuszyn, Wolborz and Rozprza. They did not arrive at Treblinka in one day. Among them were Jews from Bełchatów, Kalisz, Gniezno and Płock also deported to Piotrków. Old gas chambers cease operation and are replaced with new. Meanwhile, mass deportations from Bialystok District had just begun, and continue until February 19, 1943. In the next four months over 110,000 Jews from Bialystok General District (which includes Nazi counties of Bialystok Land, Bielsk, Grajewo, Grodno, Łomża, Sokółka, and Wolkowysk) are deported to Treblinka and annihilated.	
86	Thursday	October 15, 1942	1,500	Gozdowice, German Reich	602,641		
86	Thursday	October 15, 1942	500	Kamieńsk	603,141		
86	Thursday	October 15, 1942	2,000	Przygłów	605,141		
86	Thursday	October 15, 1942	1,500	Sulejów	606,641		
86	Thursday	October 15, 1942	4,500	Starachowice	611,141		
86	Thursday	October 15, 1942	4,000	Chotcza Nowa	615,141		
86	Thursday	October 15, 1942	600	Ciepielów	615,741		
86	Thursday	October 15, 1942	2,000	Iłża	617,741		
86	Thursday	October 15, 1942	3,000	Lipsko	620,741		
86	Thursday	October 15, 1942	2,000	Sienno	622,741		
86	Thursday	October 15, 1942	7,000	Tarłów	629,741		
86	Thursday	October 15, 1942	4,000	Wierzbnik, German Reich	633,741		
86	Thursday	October 15, 1942	1,600	Iwaniska	635,341		
86	Thursday	October 15, 1942	3,300	Ciechanowice, German Reich	638,641		
86	Thursday	October 15, 1942	2,000	Terezín Ghetto, now Czech Republic	640,641		
90	Monday	October 19, 1942	2,000	Terezín Ghetto, now Czech Republic	642,641		
91	Tuesday	October 20, 1942	6,500	Opatów Ghetto	649,141	Samuel Willenberg	
92	Wednesday	October 21, 1942					Aron Gelbard escapes.
93	Thursday	October 22, 1942	15,000	Tomaszów Mazowiecki	664,141		
93	Thursday	October 22, 1942	4,000	Biała Rawska	668,141		
93	Thursday	October 22, 1942	2,000	Orszewice	670,141		
93	Thursday	October 22, 1942	3,000	Koluszki	673,141		
93	Thursday	October 22, 1942	3,000	Nowe Miasto nad Pilicą	676,141		
93	Thursday	October 22, 1942	3,000	Opoczno	679,141		
93	Thursday	October 22, 1942	4,000	Przysucha	683,141		
93	Thursday	October 22, 1942	2,000	Terezín Ghetto, now Czech Republic	685,141		
96	Sunday	October 25, 1942	500	Osiek	685,641		
102	Saturday	October 31, 1942	4,000	Rawa Mazowiecka	689,641		
102	Saturday	October 31, 1942	2,000	Żarnów	691,641		
102	Saturday	October 31, 1942	800	Ujazd, German Reich	692,441		
102	Saturday	October 31, 1942	900	Ćmielów	693,341		
102	Saturday	October 31, 1942	500	Kunów	693,841		
102	Saturday	October 31, 1942	1,600	Koprzywnica	695,441		
102	Saturday	October 31, 1942	4,500	Ożarów	699,941		
104	Monday	November 2, 1942	4,330	Siemiatycze	704,271		
105	Tuesday	November 3, 1942	9,000	Końskie	713,271		
105	Tuesday	November 3, 1942	1,000	Gowarczów	714,271		
105	Tuesday	November 3, 1942	4,000	Radoszyce	718,271		
107	Thursday	November 5, 1942	5,000	Stopnica	723,271		
109	Saturday	November 7, 1942	6,000	Staszów	729,271		
109	Saturday	November 7, 1942	3,000	Łuków	732,271		
112	Tuesday	November 10, 1942	1,300	Goniądz	733,571		Liquidation of Kielbasin Sammellagger transit camp outside Grodno in the Bialystok District, commencing deportation action of up to 28,000 Jews expelled and imprisoned at Kielbasin from 22 surrounding cities and towns of the two sub-districts including Sokolka. The transports arriving at Treblinka started on November 10, 1942, and continued until December 15 for over a month (they did not arrive in one day). The Jews brought for gassing in trains from Kielbasin originated from the following settlements: Goniądz, Trzcianne, Augustów, Grajewo, Rajgród, Szczuczyn, Druskieniki, Jeziory, Lunna, Ostryna, Porzecze, Skidel, Sopockinie, Dąbrowa, Indura, Janow, Krynki, Kuźnica, Korycin, Odelsk, Sidra, Sokółka, Suchowola, and the Grodno Ghetto. Some 9,100 victims among them came from the Borgusze transit camp nearby.
112	Tuesday	November 10, 1942	1,200	Trzcianne	734,771		
112	Tuesday	November 10, 1942	2,000	Augustów	736,771		
112	Tuesday	November 10, 1942	2,500	Grajewo	739,271		
112	Tuesday	November 10, 1942	600	Rajgród	739,871		
112	Tuesday	November 10, 1942	1,500	Szczuczyn	741,371		
112	Tuesday	November 10, 1942	500	Druskininkai, now Lithuania	741,871		
112	Tuesday	November 10, 1942	2,000	Jeziory	743,871		
112	Tuesday	November 10, 1942	1,500	Lunna	745,371		
112	Tuesday	November 10, 1942	2,000	Ostrynka	747,371		
112	Tuesday	November 10, 1942	1,000	Porzecze	748,371		
112	Tuesday	November 10, 1942	3,000	Skidal	751,371		
112	Tuesday	November 10, 1942	2,000	Sapotskin, now Belarus	753,371		
112	Tuesday	November 10, 1942	1,000	Dąbrowa Białostocka	754,371		
112	Tuesday	November 10, 1942	2,500	Indura	756,871		
112	Tuesday	November 10, 1942	950	Janów	757,821		
112	Tuesday	November 10, 1942	5,000	Krynki	762,821		
112	Tuesday	November 10, 1942	1,000	Kuźnica	763,821		
112	Tuesday	November 10, 1942	1,000	Korycin	764,821		
112	Tuesday	November 10, 1942	500	Odelsk	765,321		
112	Tuesday	November 10, 1942	350	Sidra	765,671		
112	Tuesday	November 10, 1942	8,000	Sokółka	773,671		
112	Tuesday	November 10, 1942	5,100	Suchowola	778,771		
112	Tuesday	November 10, 1942	1,500	Grodno Ghetto, now Belarus	780,271		
112	Tuesday	November 10, 1942	850	Jałówka	781,121		Liquidation of Volkovysk transit camp. Deportation of up to 16,300 Jews imprisoned temporarily. Similar to the Sammellagger in Kielbasin, the transports began on November 10, 1942, and continued until December 15, 1942, for over a month (none of them arrived in one day). The Jews brought to Treblinka from Volkovysk camp originated from the ghettos in the following settlements: Jałówka, Lyskow, Mosty, Porozow, Roś, Różana, Swislocz, Wolkovysk, and Wolpa.
112	Tuesday	November 10, 1942	600	Lyskow	781,721		Liquidation of Volkovysk transit camp. Deportation of up to 16,300 Jews imprisoned temporarily. Similar to the Sammellagger in Kielbasin, the transports began on November 10, 1942, and continued until December 15, 1942, for over a month (none of them arrived in one day). The Jews brought to Treblinka from Volkovysk camp originated from the ghettos in the following settlements: Jałówka, Lyskow, Mosty, Porozow, Roś, Różana, Swislocz, Wolkovysk, and Wolpa.
112	Tuesday	November 10, 1942	350	Mosty	782,071		Liquidation of Volkovysk transit camp. Deportation of up to 16,300 Jews imprisoned temporarily. Similar to the Sammellagger in Kielbasin, the transports began on November 10, 1942, and continued until December 15, 1942, for over a month (none of them arrived in one day). The Jews brought to Treblinka from Volkovysk camp originated from the ghettos in the following settlements: Jałówka, Lyskow, Mosty, Porozow, Roś, Różana, Swislocz, Wolkovysk, and Wolpa.
112	Tuesday	November 10, 1942	1,000	Porozow	783,071		Liquidation of Volkovysk transit camp. Deportation of up to 16,300 Jews imprisoned temporarily. Similar to the Sammellagger in Kielbasin, the transports began on November 10, 1942, and continued until December 15, 1942, for over a month (none of them arrived in one day). The Jews brought to Treblinka from Volkovysk camp originated from the ghettos in the following settlements: Jałówka, Lyskow, Mosty, Porozow, Roś, Różana, Swislocz, Wolkovysk, and Wolpa.
112	Tuesday	November 10, 1942	1,000	Ros	784,071		Liquidation of Volkovysk transit camp. Deportation of up to 16,300 Jews imprisoned temporarily. Similar to the Sammellagger in Kielbasin, the transports began on November 10, 1942, and continued until December 15, 1942, for over a month (none of them arrived in one day). The Jews brought to Treblinka from Volkovysk camp originated from the ghettos in the following settlements: Jałówka, Lyskow, Mosty, Porozow, Roś, Różana, Swislocz, Wolkovysk, and Wolpa.
112	Tuesday	November 10, 1942	3,000	Różana	787,071		Liquidation of Volkovysk transit camp. Deportation of up to 16,300 Jews imprisoned temporarily. Similar to the Sammellagger in Kielbasin, the transports began on November 10, 1942, and continued until December 15, 1942, for over a month (none of them arrived in one day). The Jews brought to Treblinka from Volkovysk camp originated from the ghettos in the following settlements: Jałówka, Lyskow, Mosty, Porozow, Roś, Różana, Swislocz, Wolkovysk, and Wolpa.
112	Tuesday	November 10, 1942	3,000	Svislach, now Belarus	790,071		Liquidation of Volkovysk transit camp. Deportation of up to 16,300 Jews imprisoned temporarily. Similar to the Sammellagger in Kielbasin, the transports began on November 10, 1942, and continued until December 15, 1942, for over a month (none of them arrived in one day). The Jews brought to Treblinka from Volkovysk camp originated from the ghettos in the following settlements: Jałówka, Lyskow, Mosty, Porozow, Roś, Różana, Swislocz, Wolkovysk, and Wolpa.
112	Tuesday	November 10, 1942	7,000	Vawkavysk, now Belarus	797,071		Liquidation of Volkovysk transit camp. Deportation of up to 16,300 Jews imprisoned temporarily. Similar to the Sammellagger in Kielbasin, the transports began on November 10, 1942, and continued until December 15, 1942, for over a month (none of them arrived in one day). The Jews brought to Treblinka from Volkovysk camp originated from the ghettos in the following settlements: Jałówka, Lyskow, Mosty, Porozow, Roś, Różana, Swislocz, Wolkovysk, and Wolpa.
112	Tuesday	November 10, 1942	1,500	Wolfa	798,571		Liquidation of Volkovysk transit camp. Deportation of up to 16,300 Jews imprisoned temporarily. Similar to the Sammellagger in Kielbasin, the transports began on November 10, 1942, and continued until December 15, 1942, for over a month (none of them arrived in one day). The Jews brought to Treblinka from Volkovysk camp originated from the ghettos in the following settlements: Jałówka, Lyskow, Mosty, Porozow, Roś, Różana, Swislocz, Wolkovysk, and Wolpa.
117	Sunday	November 15, 1942	1,000	Gniewoszów	799,571		
122	Friday	November 20, 1942	40 cars	Biała Podlaska	?	From the communiqué published in January 1943 by the Office of Information of the underground Armia Krajowa, based on the observation of locked freight trains passing through with prisoners destined for Treblinka. Meanwhile, 35 cars with goods were sent to the Third Reich on the way back in five days.	
123	Saturday	November 21, 1942	40 cars	Białystok	?	From the communiqué published in January 1943 by the Office of Information of the underground Armia Krajowa, based on the observation of locked freight trains passing through with prisoners destined for Treblinka. Meanwhile, 35 cars with goods were sent to the Third Reich on the way back in five days.	
124	Sunday	November 22, 1942	40 cars	Białystok	?	From the communiqué published in January 1943 by the Office of Information of the underground Armia Krajowa, based on the observation of locked freight trains passing through with prisoners destined for Treblinka. Meanwhile, 35 cars with goods were sent to the Third Reich on the way back in five days.	
126	Tuesday	November 24, 1942	40 cars	Grodno	?	From the communiqué published in January 1943 by the Office of Information of the underground Armia Krajowa, based on the observation of locked freight trains passing through with prisoners destined for Treblinka. Meanwhile, 35 cars with goods were sent to the Third Reich on the way back in five days.	
132	Monday	November 30, 1942	1,700	Siedlce	801,271		
163	Thursday	December 31, 1942			According to the Höfle Telegram, the cumulative total of deportees to this date was 713,555, and 10,335 had been deported during the two weeks previous to this date. Substantial quantity of November deportations is not in the report.		
163	Thursday	December 31, 1942					Escape from the Totenlager (extermination area) via a tunnel. Only Lazar Sharson successfully escapes.
169	Wednesday	January 6, 1943	4,000	Radomsko	805,271		
173	Sunday	January 10, 1943	6,000	Sandomierz	811,271		
176	Wednesday	January 13, 1943	1,500	Radom Ghetto	812,771		
176	Wednesday	January 13, 1943	5,000	Szydłowiec	817,771		
181	Monday	January 18, 1943	1,200	Warsaw	818,971		
181	Monday	January 18, 1943	1,600	Grodno Ghetto, now Belarus	820,571	First stage of Grodno Ghetto liquidation under Kriminalkommissar Heinz Errelis who personally shoots at least 100. Over the course of 5 days, dubbed by the Jews "Operation 10,000" results in a total of some 10,000 Jews sent mostly to Auschwitz through Kielbasin Sammellagger transit camp nearby.	
182	Tuesday	January 19, 1943	1,200	Warsaw	821,771		
183	Wednesday	January 20, 1943	1,200	Warsaw	822,971		
184	Thursday	January 21, 1943	1,200	Warsaw	824,171		
185	Friday	January 22, 1943	1,200	Warsaw	825,371		
188	Monday	January 25, 1943	2,120	Jasionówka	827,491		
203	Tuesday	February 9, 1943	10,000	Białystok Ghetto	837,491		Fahrplananordnung Nr. 552; Bialystok – Treblinka
208	Sunday	February 14, 1943	4,400	Grodno Ghetto, now Belarus	841,891	Fahrplananordnung Nr. 552; Grodno – Treblinka. Final liquidation of the Ghetto, dubbed "Operation 5,000." Victims are sent in three trains agreed on January 15, 1943, by Berlin. An additional train, Pj 165, leaves Grodno for Treblinka on February 16.	
244	Thursday	March 11, 1943			Bulgarian military and police authorities transfer 11,343 Jews from the Bulgarian-occupied Thrace, Macedonia and (Serbian) Pirot to German custody pursuant to a February agreement between the SS and representatives of the Bulgarian government. German SS and police officials deport these Jews to Treblinka, where almost all are gassed or shot upon arrival.		
244	Monday	March 22, 1943	2,338	Skopje, Bulgaria	844,229		
247	Thursday	March 25, 1943	2,402	Skopje, Bulgaria	846,631		
248	Friday	March 26, 1943					Fahrplananordnung Nr. 567; Transport from the Reich
250	Sunday	March 28, 1943					Telegramm; Transports from Bulgaria and Greece to Treblinka
251	Monday	March 29, 1943	2,404	Skopje, Bulgaria	849,035		
272	Monday	April 19, 1943	7,000	Warsaw	856,035		Result of the Warsaw Ghetto Uprising
283	Friday	May 1, 1943		Wegrów		Berek Lajcher, Treblinka revolt leader	Final Wegrów Ghetto liquidation
377	Monday	August 2, 1943			Treblinka revolt erupts. Some 300 prisoners performing forced labor – aware that the SS will soon kill them – stage an uprising after the initial date of the revolt set for June 15 was postponed due to grenade detonation at the undressing area. Prisoners quietly seize weapons from the camp armory, set fire to barracks, and storm the main gate. Hundreds attempt to climb the barbed-wire fence, but the SS with Trawniki guards kill two-thirds of them with machine-gun fire. Less than a hundred escape successfully, chased in cars and on horses. Camp deportations and gassing operations halt the following month.		
393	Wednesday	August 18, 1943		Białystok Ghetto			Result of the Białystok Ghetto Uprising. Fahrplananordnung Nr. 290; Bialystok – Treblinka.
394	Thursday	August 19, 1943	7,600	Białystok Ghetto	863,635+	7,600 over the two days.	Last Jewish transport to Treblinka. All of the deportees on the transport are killed upon arrival.

== See also ==
- Jewish ghettos in German-occupied Poland
