= Międzyrzec Podlaski Ghetto =

Nazi ghetto in occupied Poland

Coordinates: 51°59′N 22°47′E

Międzyrzec Ghetto
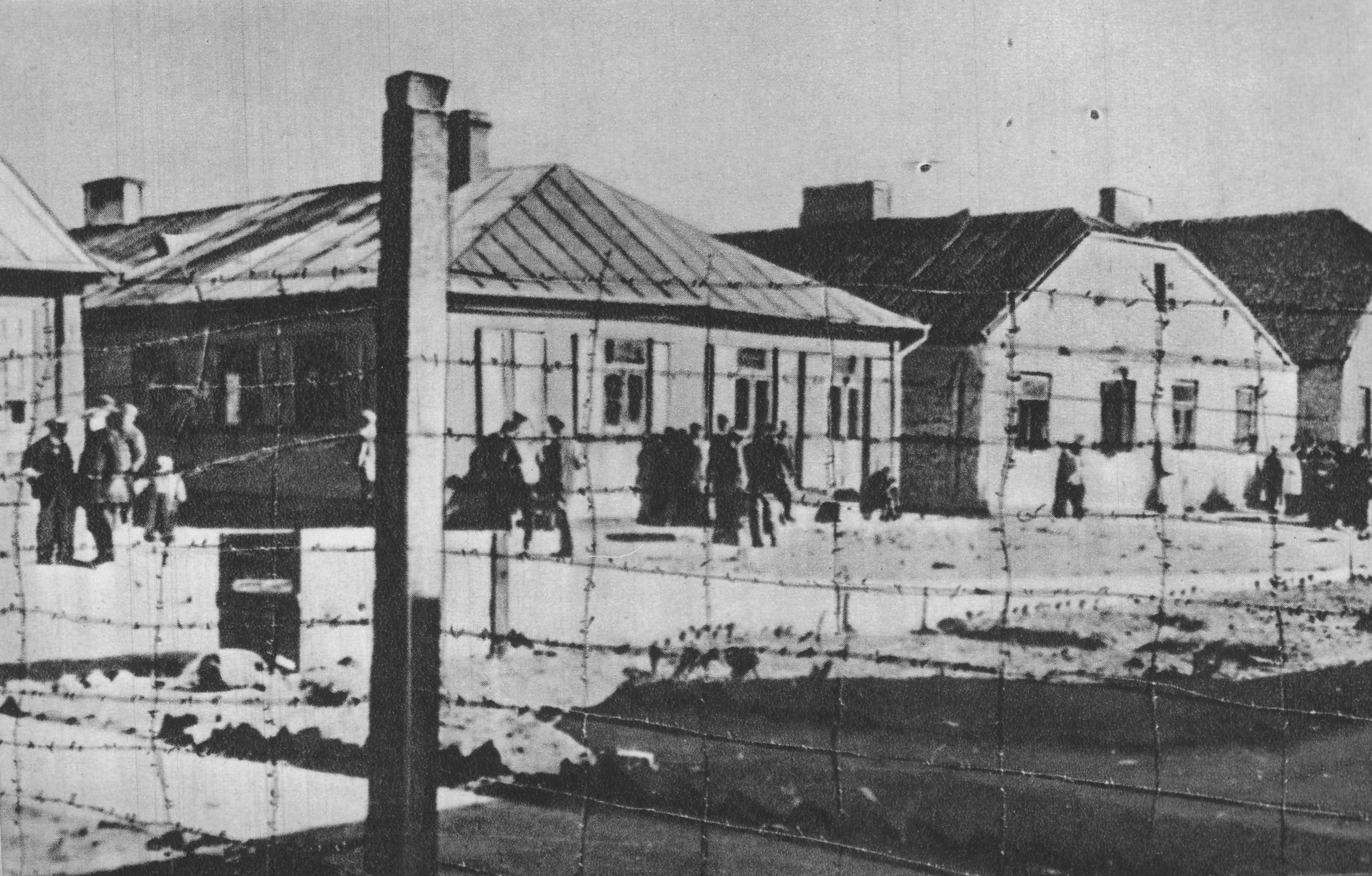
- The ghetto in 1943
- Location: Międzyrzec Podlaski, German-occupied Poland
- Incident type: Imprisonment, mass shooting, forced labor, starvation, deportations to death camps
- Perpetrators: Nazi SS, Order Police battalions
- Victims: 20,000 Jews

The Międzyrzec Podlaski Ghetto was one of the Nazi ghettos established for the confinement and persecution of the Jewish population of Międzyrzec Podlaski in the General Government territory of occupied Poland. The ghetto was liquidated in stages between 1942 and 1943 as part of the "Final Solution", with all Jews either killed on the spot in mass shooting actions or deported to Treblinka and Majdanek death camps.

== Ghetto history ==
At the end of September 1939, during the Soviet invasion of Poland, the Red Army occupied the city of Międzyrzec Podlaski. At the beginning of October, the Soviet Union handed over the city to Germany as part of the German-Soviet Frontier Treaty amended to the secret Hitler-Stalin Pact against Poland in 1939. Following the exchange, approximately 2,000 of the city's Jews left for the territories of Poland annexed by the Soviet Union. The Germans set up a transfer ghetto in the historic neighbourhood of Szmulowizna. It held 20,000 Jewish prisoners at its peak. On August 25–26, 1942 some 11,000–12,000 Jews were rounded up by German Order Police battalions amid gunfire and screams and deported to the Treblinka extermination camp.

The next mass extermination action took place around October and November 1942. "Strip-search" of young Jewish women was introduced by Oberleutnant Hartwig Gnade before executions dubbed "mopping up" actions. His first sergeant later said: "I must say that First Lieutenant Gnade gave me the impression that the entire business afforded him a great deal of pleasure." The wave of mass killings lasting non-stop for several days, conducted by the Trawniki battalion of about 350 to 400 men, while the Germans from the parallel Reserve Police Battalion 101 of the Ordnungspolizei from Hamburg dealt with the thousands of ghetto inhabitants.

On the seventeenth of July 1943, the ghetto was liquidated, with all remaining Jews deported to Treblinka and Majdanek extermination camps; at which time the last 160–200 residents were shot, and the city was officially declared free of Jews. Fewer than 1% of the Jewish population of the city survived the German occupation.

== Escape and rescue ==
Jewish townsman Sender Dyszel, who managed to escape shootings in Międzyrzec, was rescued by Polish Righteous Franciszka Abramowicz (1899–1990). She brought him food into the forest until he could return to her later. Dyszel emigrated to Argentina after 1947.

== See also ==
- Timeline of Treblinka
