= Nikolay Shalayev =

Soviet Nazi collaborator

Wachmann Nikolay Yegorovich Shalayev (Note: Russian: Николай Егорович Шалаев) was a Soviet SS auxiliary guard (Hilfswilliger) trained at Trawniki and serving as a gas chamber operator at the Treblinka extermination camp in occupied Poland during the Holocaust. He was one of two guards (along with Ivan Marchenko) in charge of the motor that produced the exhaust fumes which were fed through pipes into the gas chambers during the killing process.

Both Shalayev and Marczenko (known to his victims from Treblinka as "Ivan the Terrible") were sent by the SS to Trieste, Italy after Treblinka was closed, where they participated in the murder of prisoners at the Risiera di San Sabba concentration camp before the defeat of Nazi Germany in 1945.

Shalayev was tried in the Soviet Union after the war, and sentenced to death in 1951 for treason. On 3 May 1951 he gave testimony to his KGB interrogators about the gassing at Treblinka. In an attempt to defuse the sheer enormity of his crimes he kept pointing his finger at the Jews from the Sonderkommando "helping him". Shalayev was executed for his crimes at Treblinka.

Under interrogation to the NKVD he stated on 18 December 1950 "I together with Ivan Marchenko [Ivan Marczenko], two Germans and two Jews, was at the motor which produced the exhaust gas which was fed into the chambers of the gas chambers."
