= Łomazy =

- Village
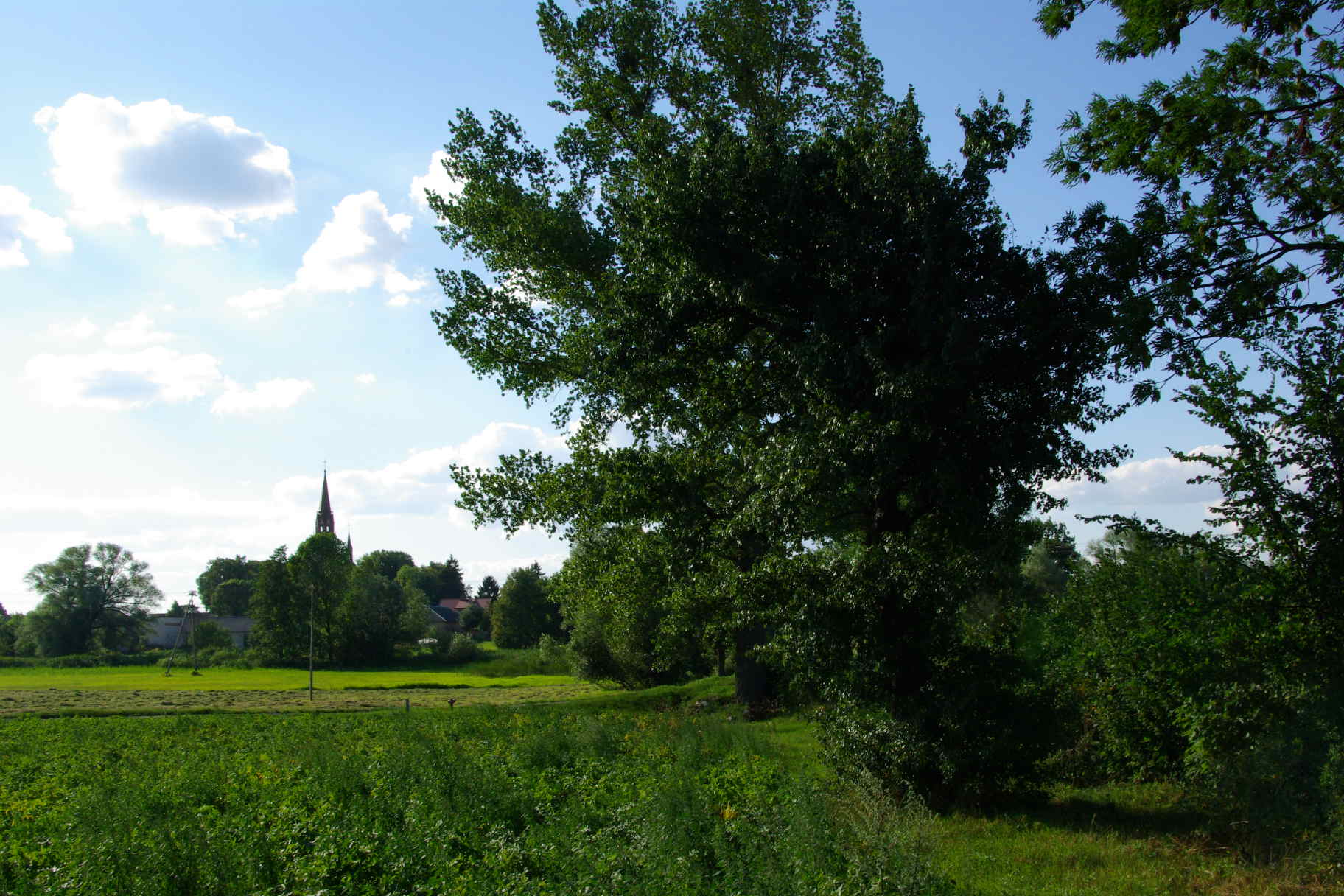
- Distant view of the Saints Peter and Paul Church

- Location within Poland
- Coordinates: 51°54′N 23°10′E
- Country: Poland
- Voivodeship: Lublin
- County: Biała
- Gmina: Łomazy

Population
  - Total: 4,694
- Time zone: UTC+1 (CET)
  - Summer (DST): UTC+2 (CEST)
- Vehicle registration: LBI

Łomazy [wɔˈmazɨ] is a village in Biała County, Lublin Voivodeship, in eastern Poland. It is the seat of the gmina (administrative district) called Gmina Łomazy.

== History ==
Łomazy was first mentioned in a document written in 1447. It was conveniently located on the trade route from Kraków to Wilno. The settlement received town rights in 1568 from Polish king Sigismund II Augustus. On 15 September 1769, it was the site of a battle between Poles led by Kazimierz Pułaski and his brothers Franciszek Ksawery Pułaski and Antoni Pułaski and the Russians. Franciszek Ksawery died in the battle.

After the Third Partition of Poland in 1795 Łomazy was annexed into the Austrian Partition first. It was regained by Poles following the Austro–Polish War of 1809, and included within the short-lived Duchy of Warsaw. After the duchy's dissolution, in 1815, it passed to the Russian Partition. On 31 August 1831, it was the site of a battle between Polish insurgents and Russian troops during the Polish November Uprising. The Russian tsar stripped Łomazy of its city rights in 1870 in retaliation for the successful Polish attack on the local Russian garrison during the January Uprising of 1863.

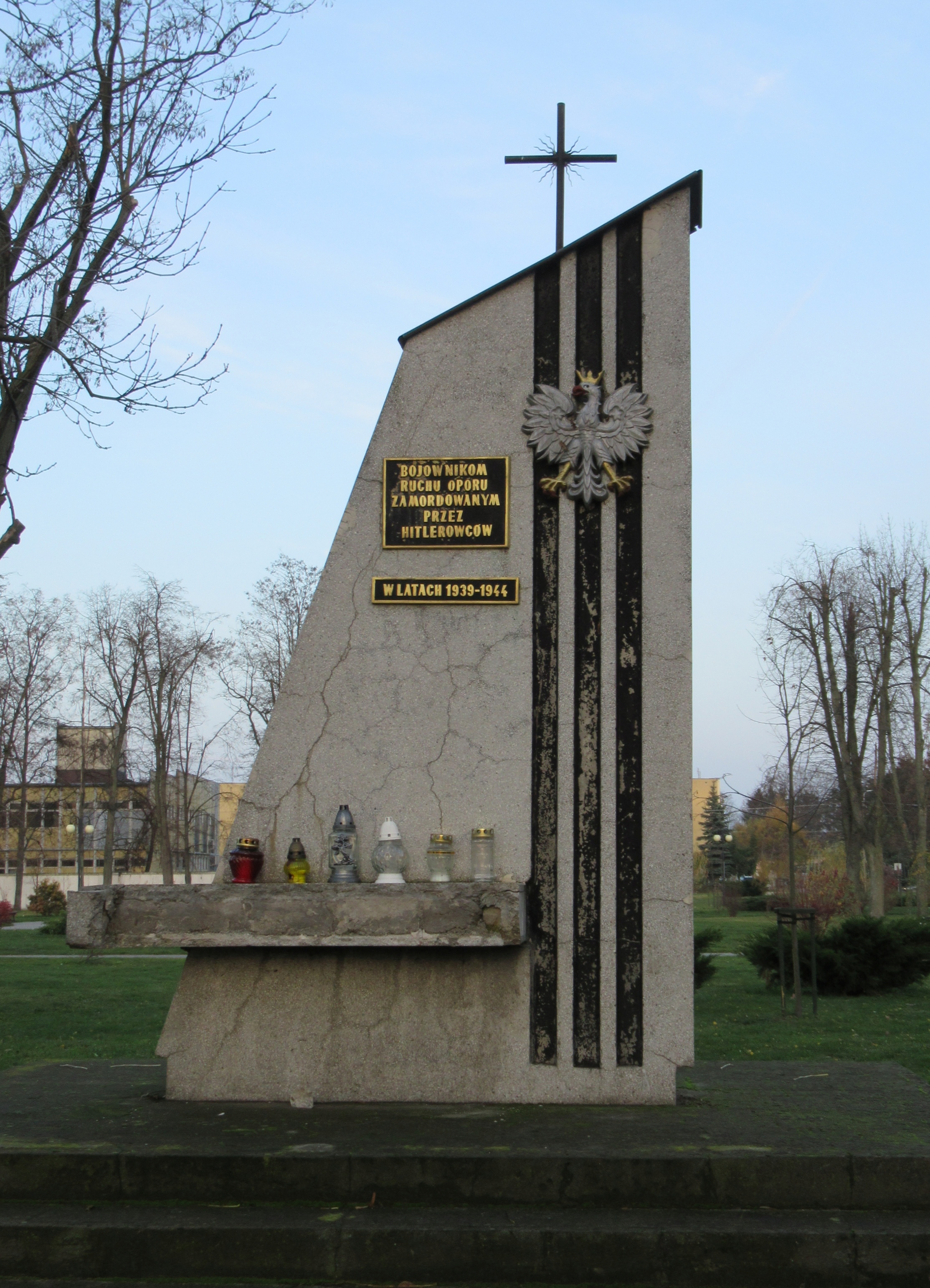
Memorial to Polish resistance members murdered by Nazi Germany in 1939–1944

Following the First World War Łomazy became part of the Lublin Voivodeship (1919–39) in the reborn sovereign Second Polish Republic. The economic situation was very difficult resulting in sizable migration. Poverty and hunger contributed to the growing tensions between Christians and Jews split in half evenly by population numbers, which in turn led to a disturbance in May 1934 requiring police intervention. Jews settled in Łomazy already in mid-16th century.

During the invasion of Poland by Nazi Germany and the Soviet Union at the onset of World War II, Łomazy was taken over by the Red Army and passed on to the Germans in the Nazi-Soviet boundary treaty. A Jewish exploitation ghetto was created in Łomazy in early 1940.

Two years later, the village was the site of a mass murder of all ghettoized Jews by the paramilitary Reserve Police Battalion 101 of the Nazi German Ordnungspolizei (Order Police) aided by the specially trained Ukrainian Hilfswillige known as Trawnikis. The killings took place on August 17 or 19, 1942 in the nearby Hały forest, but also in the homes during roundups. According to different sources some 1,000–2,000 Jews (1,700 according to German documents) were massacred in Łomazy in one day of killings which lasted until the late evening, there was only 1 documented survivor from the massacre. After the war, a group of Jews returned to excavate the bodies and provide proper burials, and a memorial was erected at the site commemorating the perished Jewish citizens of the town.
