= Józefów, Biłgoraj County =

Town in Lublin Voivodeship, Poland

Józefów
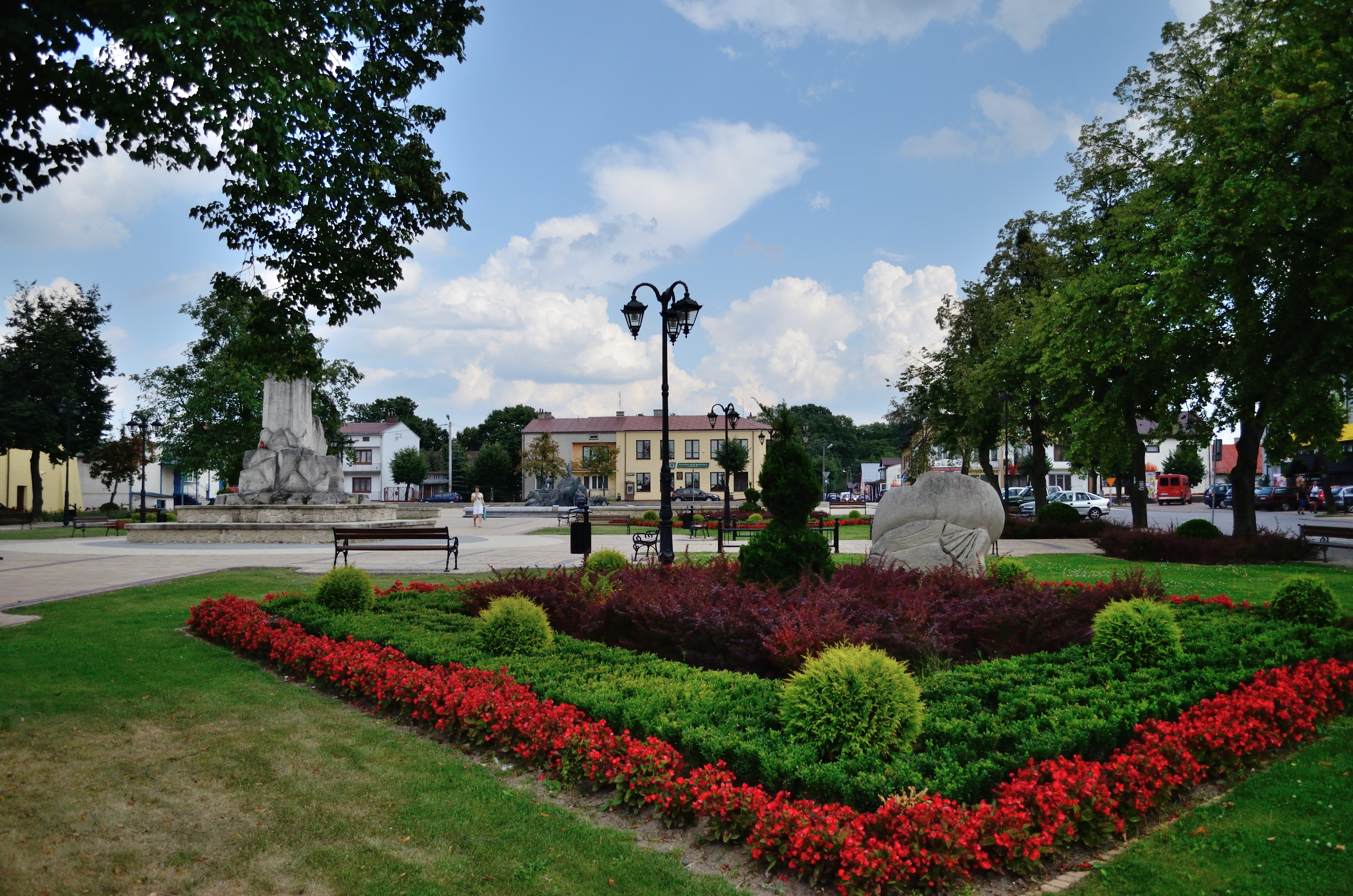
- Plac Wyzwolenia (Liberation Square)

- Coat of arms

- Location within Poland
- Coordinates: 50°29′N 23°3′E
- Country: Poland
- Voivodeship: Lublin
- County: Biłgoraj
- Gmina: Józefów
- Town rights: 1725
- Founder: Tomasz Józef Zamoyski
- Named for: Tomasz Józef Zamoyski

Government
  - Mayor: Roman Dziura (Ind.)

Area
  - Total: 5.00 km^{2} (1.93 sq mi)
- Elevation: 220 m (720 ft)

Population (2006)
  - Total: 2,450
  - Density: 490/km^{2} (1,270/sq mi)
- Time zone: UTC+1 (CET)
  - Summer (DST): UTC+2 (CEST)
- Postal code: 23-460
- Car plates: LBL
- Website: (archive)

Józefów (Polish: [juˈzɛfuf]), also called Józefów Biłgorajski, Józefów Ordynacki, is a town in Biłgoraj County, Lublin Voivodeship, Poland, with 2,436 inhabitants (2006). It lies on the Niepryszka River, in historic Lesser Poland, among the hills of Roztocze, and Solska Forest. The distance to Biłgoraj is 24 km (15 mi), to Zamość 30 km (19 mi), and to Lublin - 92 km (57 mi).

== History ==
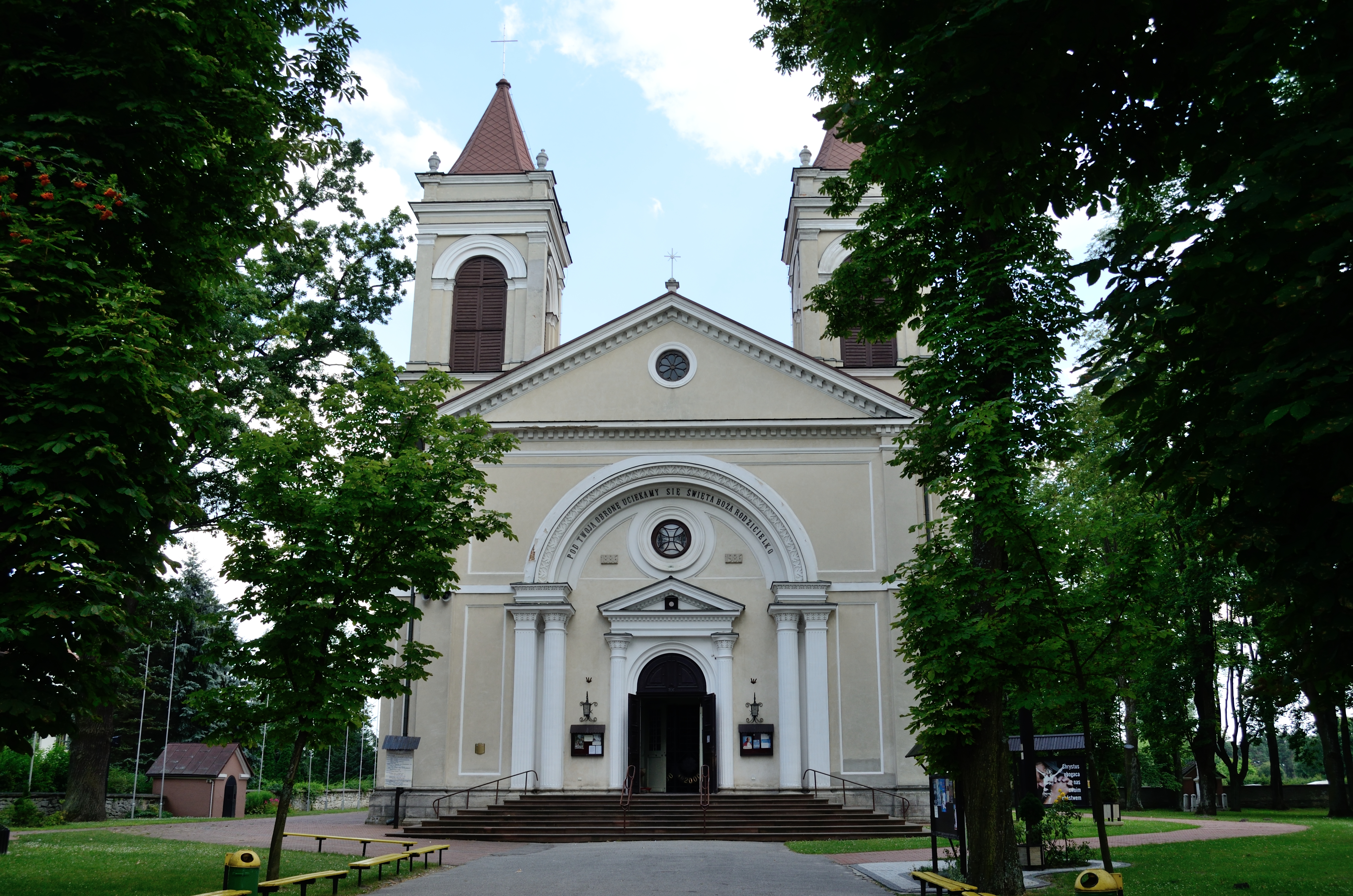
Baroque Revival Immaculate Conception church

The town was founded in the 1720s in a location of the village of Majdan Nepryski. Józefów belonged to the Zamoyski family, and its name honors Tomasz Józef Zamoyski, the 5th Ordynat of the Zamość Estate (Ordynacja zamojska). In 1725, Józefów received Magdeburg rights, with the right to organize nine fairs a year. The town remained within boundaries of the Zamość Estate until 1939. Due to a convenient location in the middle of the Estate, Józefów quickly developed, becoming a local artisan center.

In the late 18th century, however, following the Partitions of Poland, Józefów found itself under Austrian rule. After the Polish victory in the Austro-Polish War of 1809, it became part of the short-lived Duchy of Warsaw, and after the duchy's dissolution in 1815, the town became part of the Russian-controlled Congress Poland, near the border with Austrian province of Galicia. Proximity of the border did not help, as governments of both empires were not in favor of international trade on local scale. In 1864, following January Uprising, Russian authorities stripped Józefów of its town charter, as a punishment for helping Polish rebels. At that time, the number of Jews living here steadily grew as a result of Russian discriminatory policies (see Pale of Settlement), reaching 72% of the population in 1905.

In the Second Polish Republic Józefów belonged to Lublin Voivodeship (1919–39). The village was poor and backward, with most of houses made of timber and with no access to electricity. It did not have a rail station, with the nearest one located 4 km (2 mi) away, and its population was app. 2,000.

=== World War II ===
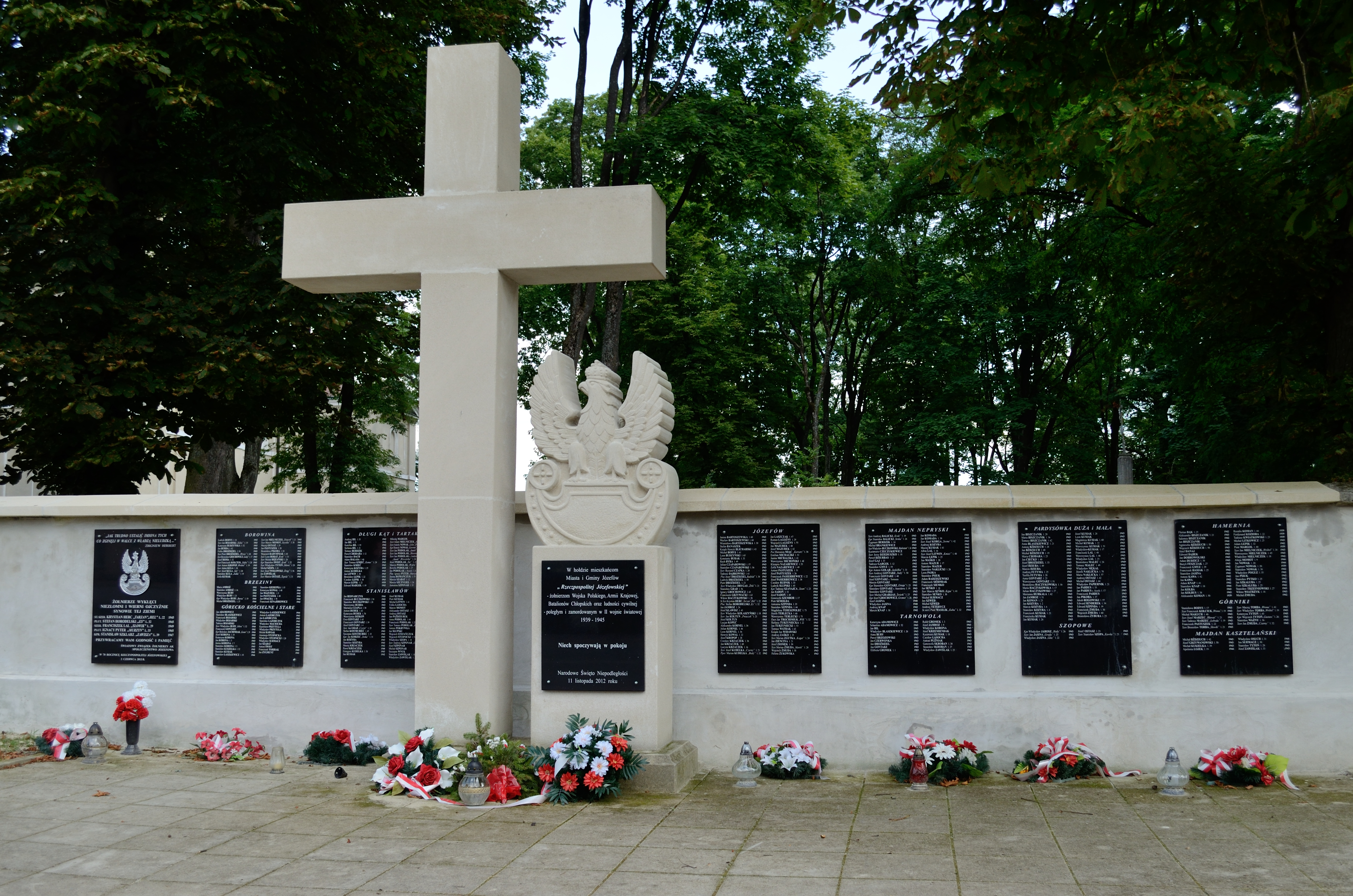
Memorial to local Polish partisans of World War II

During the invasion of Poland at the start of World War II, first Wehrmacht units entered Józefów on September 17, 1939, after heavy fighting with Warsaw Armoured Motorized Brigade (see Battle of Tomaszów Lubelski). The Luftwaffe bombarded Józefów, destroying its center. On September 28, 1939, as part of the Soviet invasion of Poland, it was seized by the Red Army. They soon withdrew (see Treaty of Non-Aggression between Germany and the Soviet Union), leaving the village to become part of the Nazi's General Government. Initially, Jews remaining in Józefów continued living relatively normal lives, governed by the Jewish Committee or Judenrat. It was an important center of Polish resistance, with numerous battles and skirmishes taking place in the area (see Zamość Uprising). On May 13, 1942, Germans killed 100 local Jews, and on July 13 approximately another 1,500 in the Józefów Massacre. On June 1, 1943, Józefów was partially destroyed for the killing of two SS officers by Polish partisans. In the same year, the village of Pardysówka, which now is a district of Józefów, was destroyed. German units retreated from the village on July 24, 1944, during Operation Bagration.

==== Józefów Massacre ====
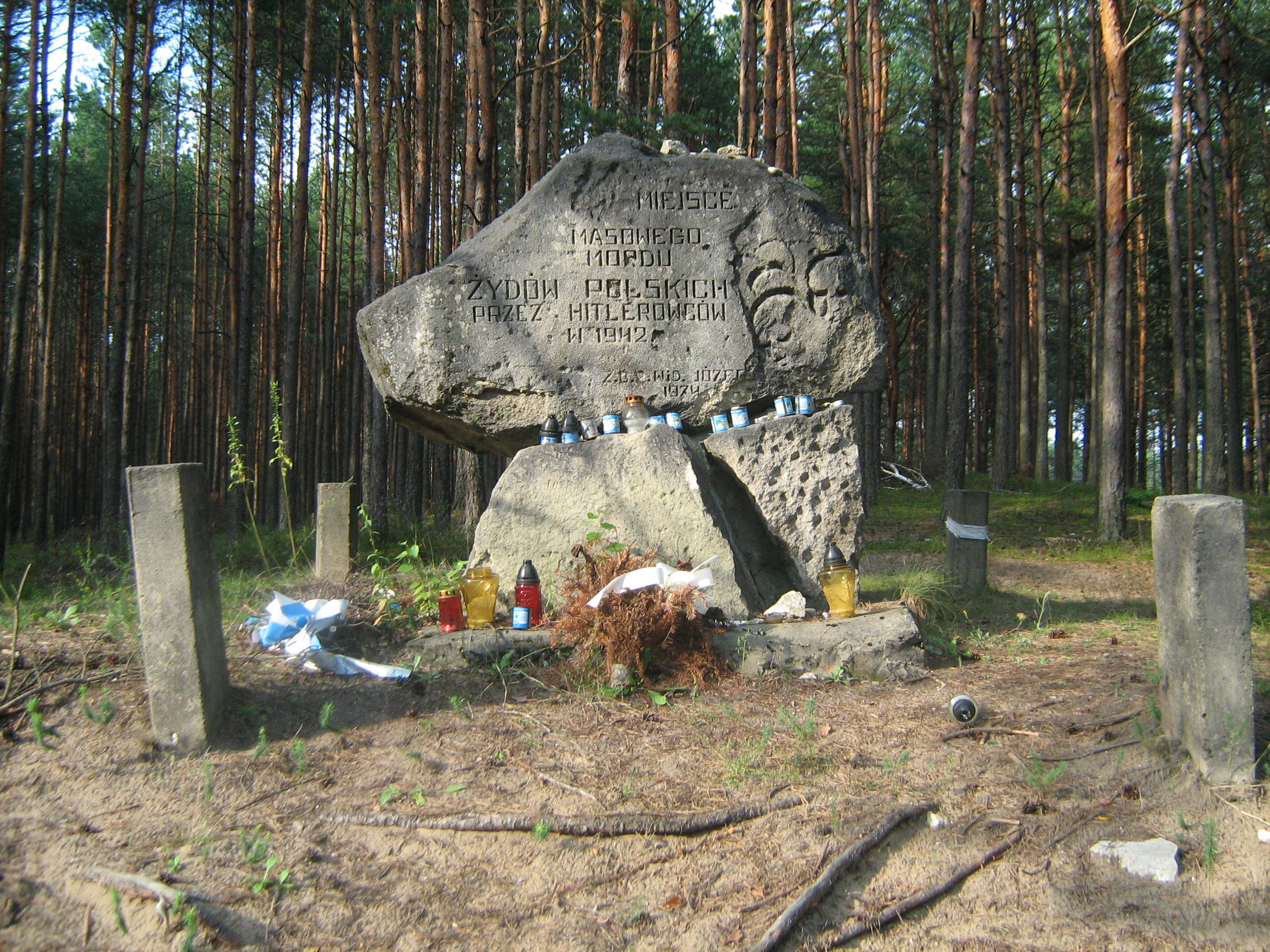
Monument in Józefów erected in 1974 to commemorate the 1942 massacre of its Jewish population by the German Nazis

Before the massacre, Józefów was a typical, relatively large village in what was then central Poland located twenty miles southeast of Biłgoraj. It had a large Jewish population numbering around 2,800. The substantial Jewish sector originated with the founding of the town in the early 18th century. Traditionally, the town was fairly poor and provincial with a large population of orthodox Jews.

The Józefów Massacre was carried out by the men of Nazi German Reserve Police Battalion 101, led by Major Wilhelm Trapp (“Pappa Trapp”). On July 12, the day before the massacre was to take place, Major Trapp relayed the orders to the officers. Sometime between the hours of midnight and 2 a.m., the battalion left for Józefów. When they arrived, Major Trapp delivered the order calling for the mass extermination of the village's Jews. One witness recalled,

He announced that in the locality before us we were to carry out a mass killing by shooting and he brought out clearly that those whom we were supposed to shoot were Jews. During his address he bid us to think of our women and children in our homeland who had to endure aerial bombardments. In particular, we were supposed to bear in mind that many women and children lose their lives in these attacks. Thinking of these facts would make it easier for us to carry out the order during the upcoming [killing] action. Major Trapp remarked that the action was entirely not in his spirit, but that he had received this order from higher authority.

First, the Jews were driven out of their homes and rounded up in the market place. Any Jew who resisted, hid, or was unable to make it to the market was ordered to be shot on the spot. Around 10 a.m, all the young men who were deemed fit to work were separated and the group (about 400) was sent to work in Lublin. During part of the selection process, the 1st Company gathered in a semi-circle around Dr. Schoenfelder where the battalion's physician proceeded to instruct the men to shoot their victims in the back of the neck. Then the remaining Jews were loaded into trucks and driven to the nearby forest. Each member of the firing squad was paired with a Jewish man, woman, or child. Together, members of the 1st Company and Jews marched into a clearing and executions were carried out after a squad leader issued the order. By noon, the 1st Company was joined by the 2nd Company and by the end of the day they had murdered between 1,200 and 1,500 Jews. The battalion left the corpses in the forest and the responsibility for their burial fell to the mayor of Józefów.

=== After the Józefów massacre ===
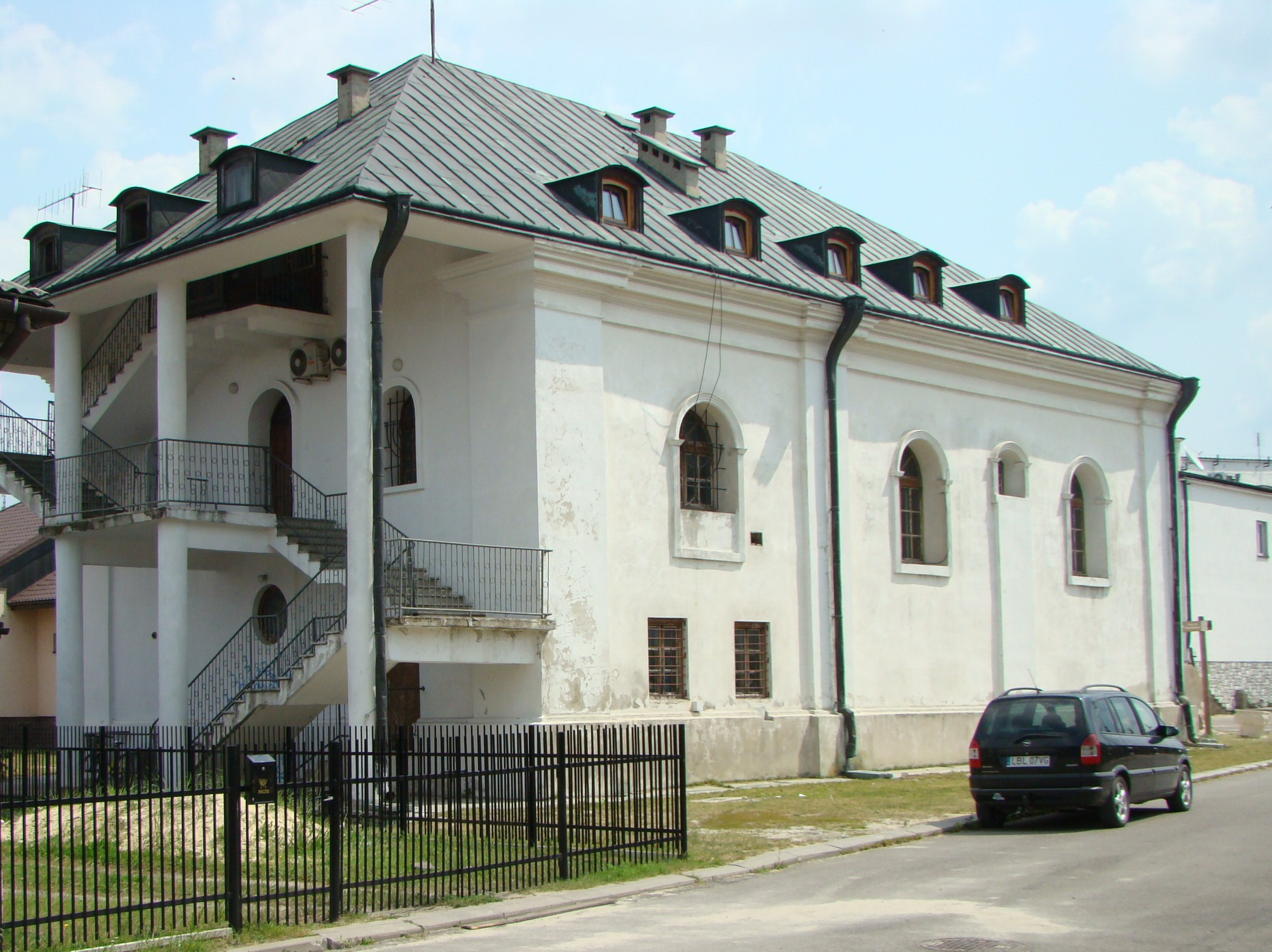
Józefów former synagogue, now a heritage library, 2013.

Some Jews did manage to escape the shootings and return. One source estimates that 200 to 300 Jews survived the Józefów massacre by hiding in homes, city buildings, and the forest. Many of the survivors came back to their town. Jews from surrounding towns were also relocated to Józefów. The remaining Jewish population was subsequently killed in the September and November 1942 deportation actions. The town was then proclaimed to be Judenfrei: free of Jews. Meanwhile, two members of the Mart family from the German minority residing in Józefów were shot by Polish underground resistance fighters thereafter for cooperation with the enemy.

=== Post-war period ===
Józefów regained its town charter in 1989. The town is now a popular tourist center, due to its picturesque location. It has a 19th-century synagogue, and a 19th-century parish church with a park and a cemetery.
