= Częstochowa Ghetto =

Nazi ghetto in occupied Poland

Coordinates: 50.8125°N 19.12730°E

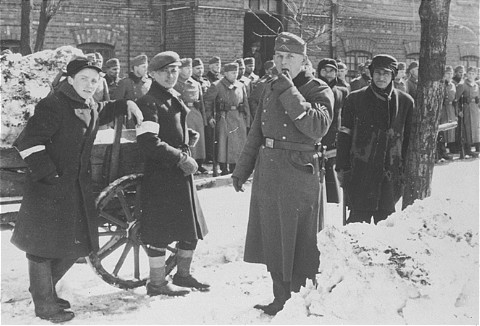
- Jewish men clearing snow for German troops, Częstochowa Ghetto, Poland c. 1941–1942

- Częstochowa location in the Holocaust in Poland
- Location: Częstochowa, German-occupied Poland
- Incident type: Imprisonment, forced labor, starvation
- Organizations: Schutzstaffel (SS)
- Camp: Treblinka extermination camp
- Victims: 48,000 Polish Jews

The Częstochowa Ghetto was a World War II ghetto set up by Nazi Germany for the purpose of persecution and exploitation of local Jews in the city of Częstochowa during the German occupation of Poland. The approximate number of people confined to the ghetto was around 40,000 at the beginning and in late 1942 at its peak, immediately before mass deportations, 48,000. Most ghetto inmates were delivered by the Holocaust trains to Treblinka extermination camp, where they were murdered. In June 1943, the remaining ghetto inhabitants launched the Częstochowa Ghetto uprising, which was extinguished by the SS after a few days of fighting.

== Ghetto history ==
The official order for the creation of the ghetto in Częstochowa was issued on 9 April 1941 by Stadthauptmann Richard Wendler. In addition to Jews from Częstochowa, more Jews were brought in by rail from nearby towns and villages of the Generalgouvernement part of occupied south-western Second Polish Republic, including from Krzepice, Olsztyn, Mstów, Janów, and Przyrów, on top of expellees from Polish lands annexed into the Reich at the beginning of war, mostly from Płock and Łódź. The ghetto inmates were forced to work as slave labour in the armaments industry, a majority of them in the expanded Polish foundry "Metalurgia" located on Krotka Street (which had been taken over by the German manufacturer HASAG, and renamed Hassag-Eisenhütte AG) as well as in other local factories or workshops.

The Nazis began liquidating the ghetto on 22 September 1942 during Operation Reinhard (the day after Yom Kippur). The first wave of deportations concluded on the night of 7 October. The action was carried out by German units together with their Ukrainian and Latvian auxiliaries (Hiwis), known as Trawniki men, under the command of the captain of the Schupo police, Paul Degenhardt. Every day, the Jews were being assembled on Daszyński square for "resettlement" and then transported by the Holocaust freight trains – men, women and children – to the Treblinka extermination camp: around 40,000 victims in total.

Righteous Among the Nations who helped Częstochowa Ghetto's Jews included Helena Sitkowska, the Koźmiński family the Klewicki family, and the Sikora family. Jan Brust from Żegota was shot in the first half of 1944 for delivering food to the Jewish inmates of the slave labour facility. Other members of the Brust family in Częstochowa helped to aid and shelter Jews, and after the war received the Righteous award.

== The uprising ==
Those who survived the main thrust of ghetto liquidation (about 5,000–6,000 slave workers and their families) were put in the so-called Small Ghetto for the Hugo Schneider munitions factory. There, 850 Jews were executed. Soon, a clandestine Jewish Fighting Organisation was formed by Mordechaj Zilberberg, Sumek Abramowicz and Heniek Pesak among others. The organization consisted of 300 members.

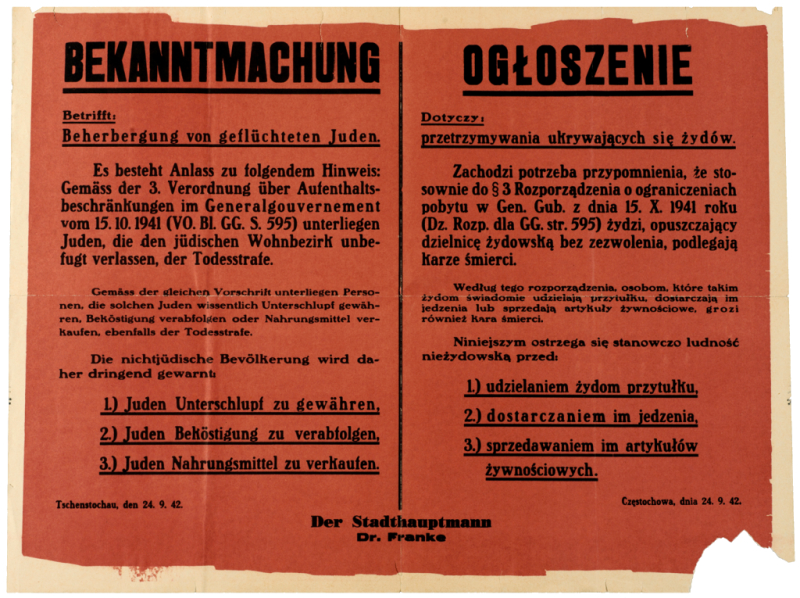
Częstochowa warning poster about death penalty for leaving the ghetto and aiding Jews, signed by Eberhardt Franke, 1942

When the Germans moved in to liquidate the Small Ghetto on 26 June 1943 the Częstochowa Ghetto Uprising erupted. Zylberberg committed suicide when the Germans stormed his bunker. 1,500 Jews died in the fighting. On 30 June the resistance was suppressed with additional 500 Jews burned alive or buried beneath the rubble. 3,900 Jews were captured and put to work in labour camps Apparatebau, Warthewerk and Eisenhütte. 400 people were shot following a selection. In December that year 1,200 prisoners were transported to Germany. The men were sent to Buchenwald, the women to Dachau (all perished). However, the much needed foundry camps were revived in the second half of 1944 with around 10,000 new workers sent in from Łódź, Kielce, Radomsk and Skarżysko-Kamienna. On 15 and 16 January 1945, ahead of the Soviet advance, about 3,000 prisoners were sent to Germany; all perished. The remaining 5,200 Jews employed in Częstochowa slave-labor camps were liberated by the Red Army.

== See also ==
- Timeline of Treblinka
