= Ivan the Terrible (Treblinka guard) =

Nazi concentration camp guard (born 1911)

"Ivan the Terrible" (born c. 1920) is the nickname given to a notorious guard at the Treblinka extermination camp during the Holocaust. The moniker alluded to Ivan IV, also known as Ivan the Terrible, the infamous tsar of Russia. "Ivan the Terrible" gained international recognition following the 1986 case of Ukrainian–American John Demjanjuk. By 1944, a cruel guard named Ivan, sharing his distinct duties and extremely violent behavior with a guard named Nicholas, was mentioned in survivor literature (Rok w Treblince by Jankiel Wiernik, translated into English as A Year in Treblinka in 1945). He disappeared in 1945, and his fate is unknown.

Demjanjuk was first accused of being Ivan the Terrible at the Treblinka concentration camp. Demjanjuk was found guilty of war crimes and was sentenced to death by hanging. Exculpatory material in the form of conflicting identifications from Soviet archives was subsequently released, identifying Ivan the Terrible as one Ivan Marchenko, leading the Supreme Court of Israel to acquit Demjanjuk in 1993 because of reasonable doubt. Demjanjuk was later extradited to Germany where he was convicted in 2011 of war crimes for having served at Sobibor extermination camp. While awaiting his appeal hearing, Demjanjuk died at the age of 91 in a nursing home. Under German law, his conviction did not enter into force due to his pending appeal, so he remains presumed innocent.

== Background ==
Treblinka was managed by 20 to 25 SS overseers (Germans) and 80 to 120 Hiwi guards of various Soviet ethnicities, including Russian and Ukrainian Red Army prisoners of war. They were assisted by a cadre of Jewish inmates known as kapos, who were prisoner functionaries. Ivan is a common Ukrainian, Russian, and Belarusian given name. Volksdeutsche were known to have Slavic given names. An example would be Ivan Klatt, Ukrainian guard leader or a Volksdeutscher who served in the Sobibor extermination camp. According to Chil Rajchman six men called Ivan worked at Treblinka.

The vast majority of Hiwi guards who were trained at the Trawniki concentration camp facility had to contend with a language barrier; however, there were a number of Volksdeutsche among them, valued because they spoke German, Ukrainian, Russian and other languages. They could also understand basic Yiddish. The German and Austrian SS command, local Poles, and Jewish inmates often referred to guards as Ukrainians not only because of their ethnicity, or because they originated from Ukraine, but also because they spoke Ukrainian between themselves. Most of the squad commanders were Volksdeutsche.

== Duties ==
Although there were other guards known as Ivan at Treblinka, Ivan the Terrible was also referred to as Ukrainian. His function at the camp was to operate the two tank engines that fed the gas chambers. The motors had been installed and fine-tuned by SS-Scharführer Erich Fuchs. Treblinka survivor Chil Rajchman testified that Ivan was about 25 years old at the time he worked in the camp. He was known for his extreme cruelty. According to Rajchman, Ivan the Terrible used to cut off the ears of workers as they walked by, and these people were forced to continue working as they bled. Shortly thereafter, Rajchman says, he would proceed to kill them outright. Rajchman also testifies that Ivan the Terrible tortured victims with pipes, a sword, and whips before they entered the gas chambers.

== Identity ==
The true identity of the guard referred to as Ivan the Terrible has not been conclusively determined. Throughout the 1970s and 1980s, John Demjanjuk, a retired suburban Cleveland autoworker of Ukrainian descent, was accused of being Ivan. He was tried in Israel in 1988 and sentenced to death, but the conviction was overturned. One remarkable event during the trial in Israel involved a star witness for the prosecution, Eliyahu Rosenberg. Asked by the prosecution if he recognised Demjanjuk, Rosenberg asked Demjanjuk to remove his glasses "so I can see his eyes". Rosenberg approached and peered closely at Demjanjuk's face. When Demjanjuk smiled and offered his hand, Rosenberg recoiled and shouted, "Grozny!" (гро́зный!), meaning "Terrible" in Russian. Rosenberg then stated: "Ivan, I say it unhesitatingly, without the slightest shadow of a doubt. It is Ivan from Treblinka, from the gas chambers, the man I am looking at now." Rosenberg further told the court, glaring at Demjanjuk "I saw his eyes, I saw those murderous eyes." Rosenberg then exclaimed directly to Demjanjuk: "How dare you put out your hand, murderer that you are!" It was later revealed that Rosenberg had previously testified in a 1947 deposition that Ivan the Terrible had been killed during a prisoner uprising.

On 29 July 1993, the Israeli Supreme Court overturned the guilty verdict on appeal. The ruling was based on new evidence, the written statements of 37 former guards at Treblinka (some of whom had been executed by the Soviet Union, and others who had died of old age, and could therefore not be cross-examined) that identified Ivan the Terrible as another man named Ivan Marchenko (possibly Marshenko, or Marczenko). One document described Ivan the Terrible as having brown hair, hazel eyes, a square face, and a large scar down to his neck; Demjanjuk was dark blond with gray eyes, a round face, and no such scar. According to one testimony, Marchenko was last seen in Yugoslavia in 1944. According to the testimony of Nikolai Yegorovich Shelayev, a Russian Treblinka gas chamber operator, he and Marchenko together with two Germans and two Jews, operated the motor which produced the exhaust gas that was fed into gas chambers. Shelayev and Marchenko were transferred from Treblinka to Trieste in July 1943, where Marchenko guarded German warehouses and a local prison. In 1944 as Allied forces approached, Marchenko and a driver named Gregory "fled in an armored car to the partisans in Yugoslavia." Shelayev last saw Marchenko in the spring of 1945, in Fiume, where he saw him coming out of a brothel. Marchenko told Shelayev that he had joined the Yugoslav partisans. As late as 1962, Soviet authorities were looking for him. The Soviet documents created enough reasonable doubt to disqualify Demjanjuk, and his previous conviction was overturned. Some of the exculpatory evidence that led to Demjanjuk's release in 1993 had come to light years before and was deliberately withheld from the Israelis by the Office of Special Investigations (OSI) of the US Department of Justice, which had urged Israel to charge him with being Ivan the Terrible.

Gilbert S. Merritt Jr., judge of the United States Court of Appeals for the Sixth Circuit, said of the OSI's handling of the Demjanjuk case: "Today we know that they – the OSI, the prosecution in the case and the State Department – lied through their teeth. Even then they knew without a doubt that Demjanjuk was not Ivan the Terrible, but they hid the information from us. I am sorry that I did not have the information at the time. If I did, we would never have ruled in favor of his extradition to Israel." Merritt said that what happened in his courtroom was "nothing short of a witch hunt. In retrospect, it reminds me of the witch trials in Salem, Massachusetts 300 years ago. The prosecution, counseled by the OSI, presented documents and witnesses whose testimony was based on emotions and hysteria, but not hard evidence. To my regret, we believed them. This instance is a prime example of how justice can be distorted."

Demjanjuk was later extradited to Germany on charges that he was another guard by the name of Ivan Demjanjuk, who served at the Sobibor extermination camp. During the trial, the problem of identity again became a key issue. Demjanjuk claimed he was not the Ivan Demjanjuk alleged to have been a guard at Sobibor, and that the Trawniki identification card supplied by the OSI to Germany, and on which the prosecution based its case, was a Soviet KGB forgery. On 12 May 2011, Demjanjuk was convicted pending appeal by a German criminal court of having been a guard at Sobibor extermination camp. Demjanjuk's appeal had not yet been heard by the German Appellate Court when he died in March 2012. Consequently, the German Munich District Court declared him "presumed innocent". The court also confirmed that Demjanjuk's previous interim conviction was invalidated, and that Demjanjuk was cleared of any criminal record.

== See also ==
- List of fugitives from justice who disappeared
- Petar Brzica
