= Wilhelm Trapp =

Nazi war criminal (1889–1948)

Wilhelm Gustav Friedrich Trapp
- Born: 4 September 1889; Havelberg, German Empire
- Died: 18 December 1948 (aged 59); Siedlce, Masovian Voivodeship, Polish People's Republic
- Cause of death: Execution by hanging
- Political party: Nazi Party
- Status: Executed
- Conviction: War crimes
- Penalty: Death
- Police career
- Allegiance: Nazi Germany
- Branch: Ordnungspolizei
- Service years: July 1942 – November 1943
- Rank: Major
- Commands: Reserve Police Battalion 101

Major Wilhelm Gustav Friedrich Trapp, nicknamed Papa Trapp by his subordinates, (4 September 1889 – 18 December 1948) was a German career policeman who commanded the Reserve Police Battalion 101 formation of Nazi Germany's uniformed police force known as the Order Police (Ordnungspolizei). The Battalion was the subject of Christopher Browning's Ordinary Men.

A World War I veteran, recipient of the Iron Cross First Class, and an "old Party fighter", having joined the NSDAP in December 1932, Trapp served in occupied Poland during World War II, subsequently leading his battalion of nearly 500 middle-aged men from Hamburg on genocidal missions against the Polish Jews.

After the war, Trapp was taken into British custody. After investigation by the Polish Military Mission, the British extradited him to Poland in 1946, where he was put on trial as a war criminal. Trapp was found guilty and sentenced to death by the Siedlce District Court on 6 July 1948, and executed by hanging on 18 December 1948, along with fellow officer Gustav Drewes.

== Excerpts ==
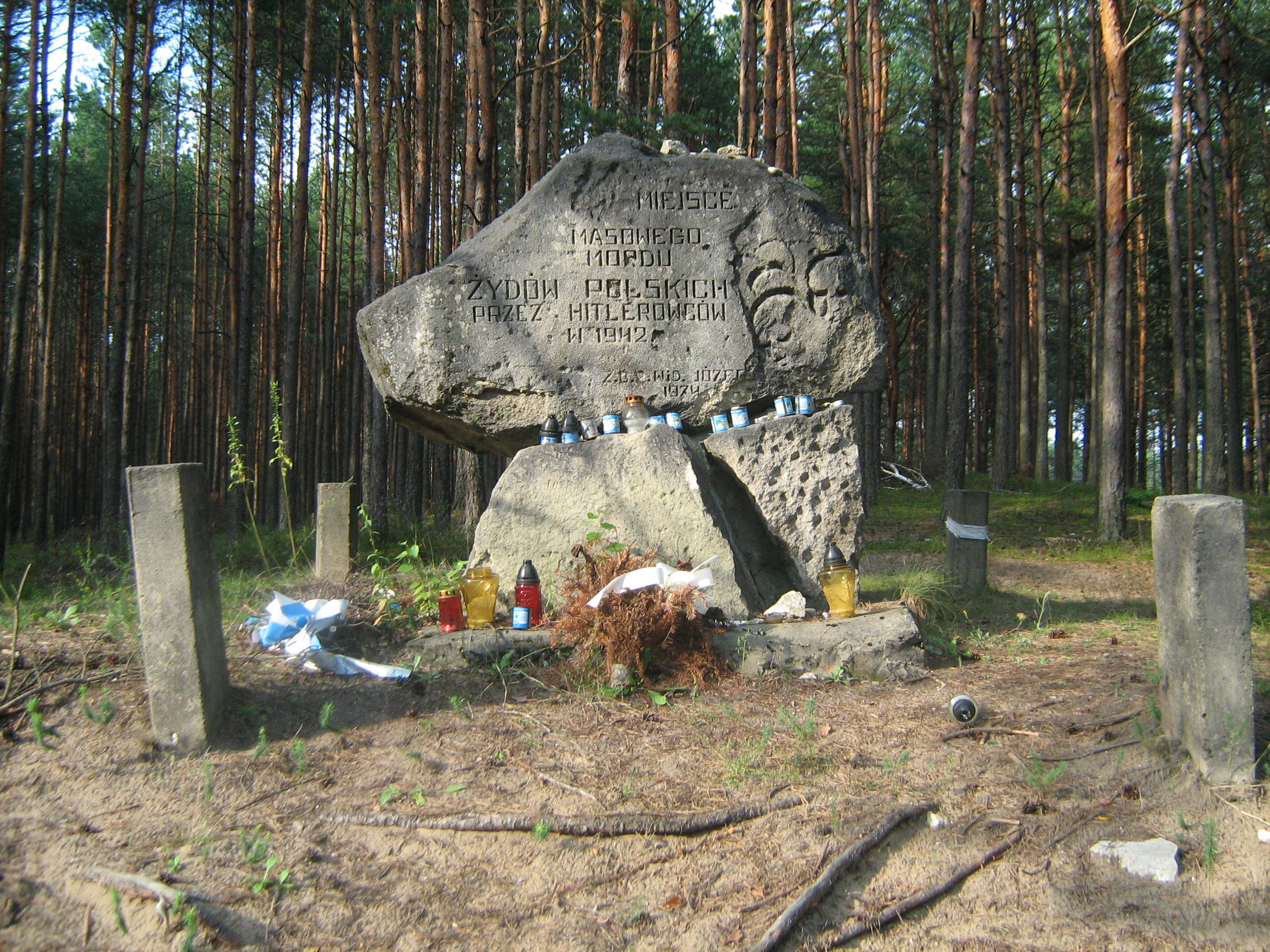
Memorial in the forest of Winiarczykowa Góra near Józefów, southeast of Biłgoraj commemorating the Jewish victims of the 1942 massacre committed by the Reserve Police Battalion 101

The killing of 1,500 of the 1,800 Jews from Józefów (other names: Józefów Biłgorajski, Józefów Ordynacki, Józefów Roztoczański) located 30 kilometres (20 mi) southeast of Biłgoraj in Distrikt Lublin on 13 July 1942 was performed by German (Ordnungspolizei) policemen: the 1. Company, and, mostly, by the three platoons of the 2. Company. Trapp gave his commanders their respective assignments before the operation:

"The men were explicitly ordered to shoot anyone trying to escape. The remaining men were to round up the Jews and take them to the marketplace. Those too sick or frail to walk to the marketplace, as well as infants and anyone offering resistance or attempting to hide, were to be shot on the spot."

Trapp, upon receiving orders to massacre the village of Józefów, offered his men a chance to avoid this duty.

"If any of the older men among them did not feel up to the task that lay before him, he could step out. Trapp paused and after some moments, one man stepped forward. The captain of 3rd company, enraged that one of his men had broken ranks, began to berate the man. The major told the captain to hold his tongue. Then ten or twelve other men stepped forward as well."

The bodies of the dead carpeting the forest floor at the Winiarczykowa Góra hill (about 2 km from the village) were left unburied. Watches, jewelry and money were taken.

The Reserve Police Battalion 101 left for Biłgoraj at 9 pm. According to one policeman, Trapp told him "Man, … such jobs don't suit me. But orders are orders." Trapp later remarked to his driver: "If this Jewish business is ever avenged on earth, then have mercy on us Germans."
