= Żłobek Duży =

- Village
- Location within Poland
- Coordinates: 51°27′51″N 23°33′54″E
- Country: Poland
- Voivodeship: Lublin
- County: Włodawa
- Gmina: Włodawa

Żłobek Duży (Polish: [ˈʐwɔbɛk ˈduʐɨ]) is a village in the administrative district of Gmina Włodawa, within Włodawa County, Lublin Voivodeship, in eastern Poland, close to the border with Belarus.

== See also ==
- Sobibor extermination camp
- Sobibór Museum
- Sobibór (village)
