= Sobibor extermination camp =

Nazi extermination camp in Poland (1942–1943)

Sobibor
- Extermination camp
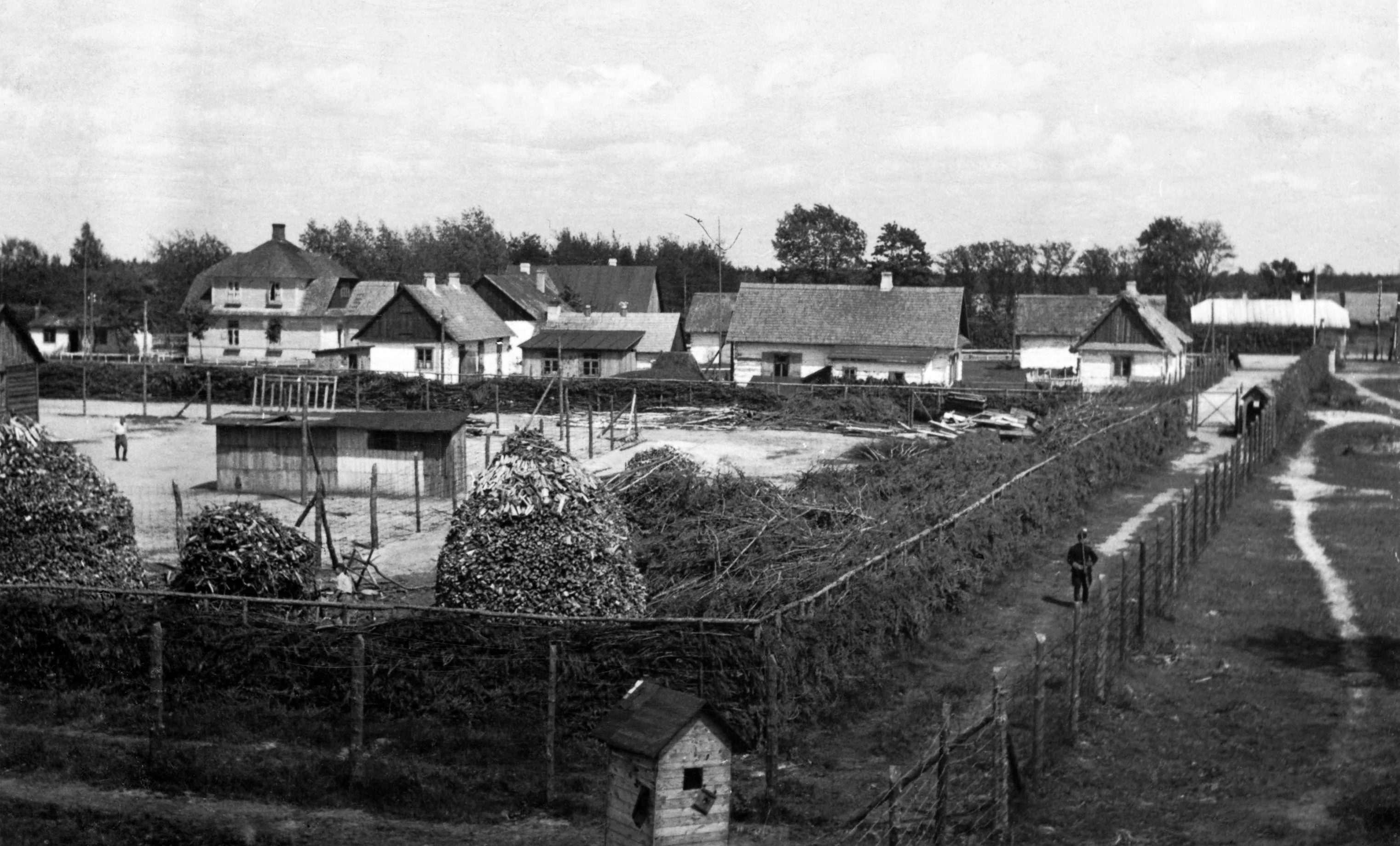
- Sobibor extermination camp, summer 1943

- Location within Poland Location within Europe
- Coordinates: 51°26′50″N 23°35′37″E
- Other names: SS-Sonderkommando Sobibor
- Known for: Genocide during the Holocaust
- Location: Near Sobibór, General Government (occupied Poland)
- Built by: Richard Thomalla (camp); Erwin Lambert (gas chambers)
- Commandant: Franz Stangl (28 April 1942 – 30 August 1942); Franz Reichleitner (1 September 1942 – 17 October 1943)
- Operational: May 1942 – 14 October 1943
- Inmates: Jews, mainly from Poland
- Number of inmates: 600–650 slave labour at any given time
- Killed: 170,000–250,000
- Notable inmates: List of survivors of Sobibor

Sobibor (/ˈsoʊbɪbɔːr/ SOH-bi-bor; Polish: Sobibór [sɔˈbibur]; German: [ˈzoːbibɔʁ]) was an extermination camp built and operated by Nazi Germany as part of Operation Reinhard. It was located in the forest near the village of Żłobek Duży in the General Government region of German-occupied Poland.

As an extermination camp rather than a concentration camp, Sobibor existed for the sole purpose of murdering Jews. The vast majority of prisoners were gassed within hours of arrival. Those not killed immediately were forced to assist in the operation of the camp, and few survived more than a few months. In total, some 170,000 to 250,000 people were murdered at Sobibor, making it the fourth-deadliest Nazi camp after Auschwitz, Treblinka, and Belzec.

The camp ceased operation after a prisoner revolt which took place on 14 October 1943. The plan for the revolt involved two phases. In the first phase, teams of prisoners were to discreetly assassinate each of the SS officers. In the second phase, all 600 prisoners would assemble for evening roll call and walk to freedom out the front gate. However, the plan was disrupted after only eleven SS men had been killed. The prisoners had to escape by climbing over barbed wire fences and running through a mine field under heavy machine gun fire. About 300 prisoners made it out of the camp, of whom roughly 60 survived the war.

After the revolt, the Nazis demolished most of the camp in order to hide their crimes from the advancing Red Army. In the first decades after World War II, the site was neglected and the camp had little presence in either popular or scholarly accounts of the Holocaust. It became better known after it was portrayed in the TV miniseries Holocaust (1978) and the film Escape from Sobibor (1987). The Sobibor Museum now stands at the site, which continues to be investigated by archaeologists. Photographs of the camp in operation were published in 2020 as part of the Sobibor perpetrator album.

== Background ==
=== Operation Reinhard ===
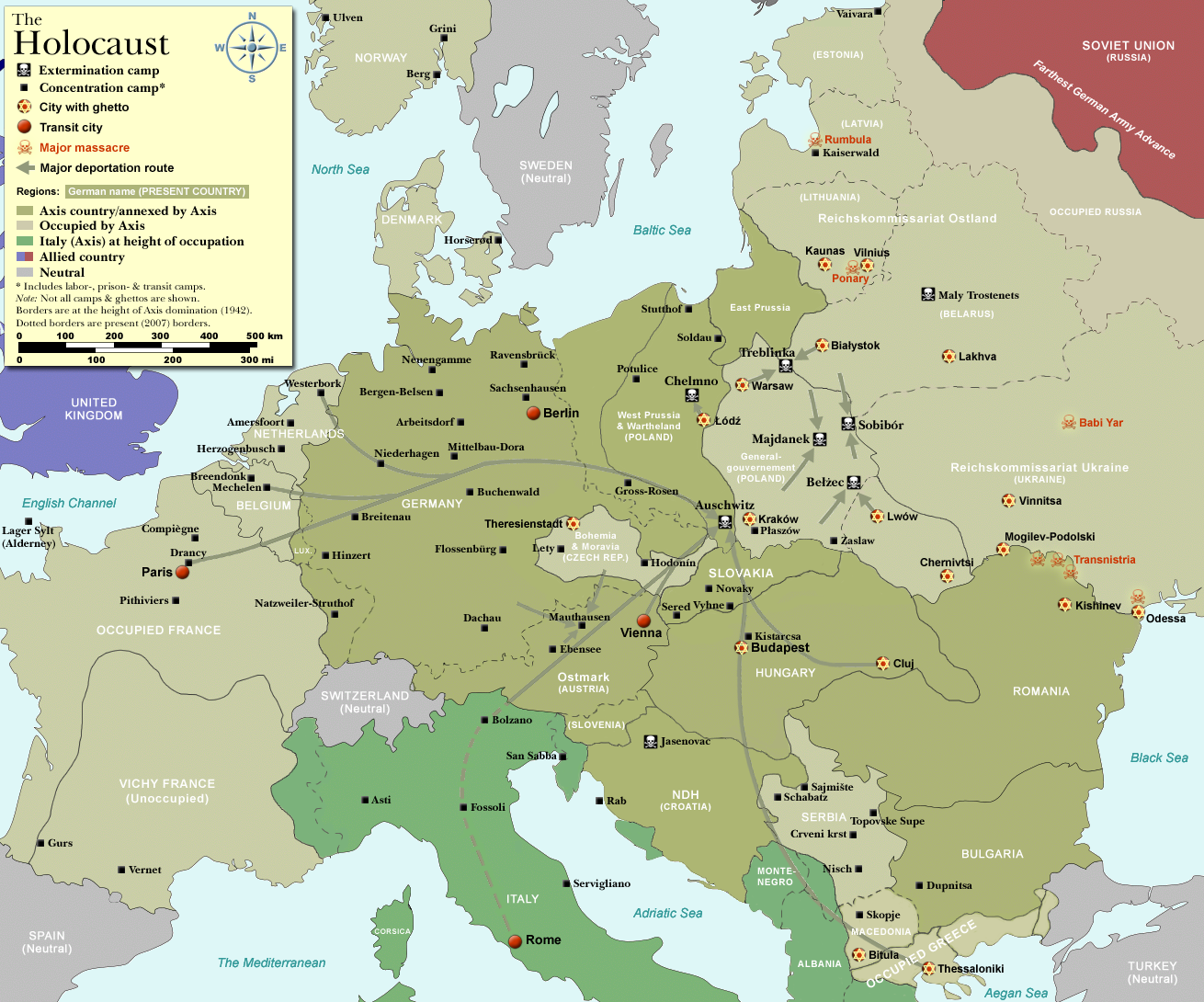
Map of the Holocaust in Europe. Sobibor is located right of centre.

Sobibor was one of four extermination camps established as part of Operation Reinhard, the deadliest phase of the Holocaust. The extermination of Europe's Jews did not originate as a single top-down decision, but was rather a patchwork of decisions made regarding particular occupied areas. Following the invasion of Poland in September 1939, the Germans began implementing the Nisko Plan in which Jews were deported from ghettos across Europe to the forced labour camps which comprised the Lublin Reservation. Lublin District region was chosen in particular for its inhospitable conditions. The Nisko Plan was abandoned in 1940 but many forced labour camps continued operations in the area, including Trawniki, Lipowa 7, and Dorohucza.

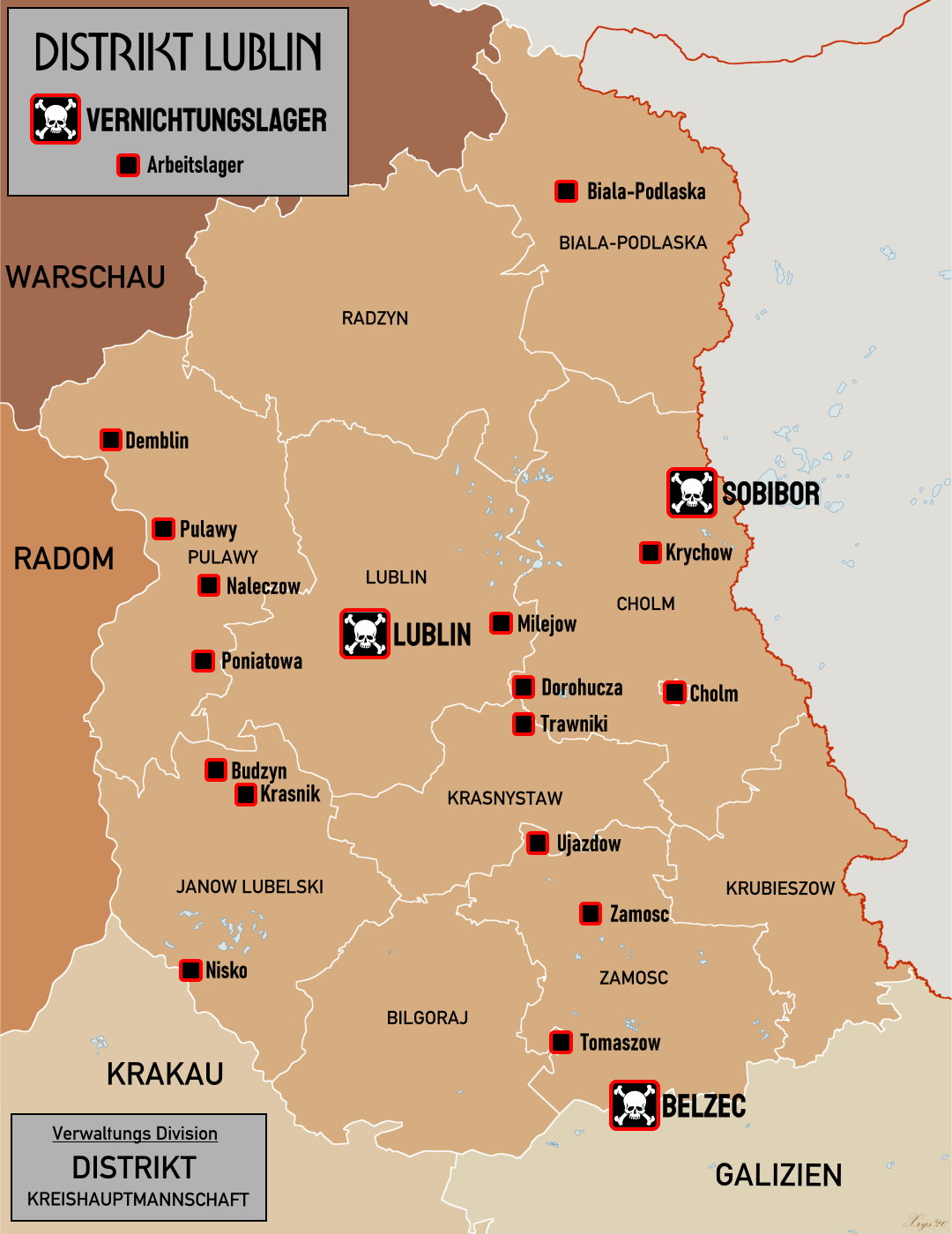
Map of the Lublin District camps. Sobibor is right of centre.

In 1941, the Nazis began experimenting with gassing Jews. In December 1941, SS officials at Chełmno conducted experiments using gas vans and the first mass gassings were conducted at Auschwitz concentration camp in January. At the Wannsee Conference on 20 January 1942, Reinhard Heydrich announced a plan for systematically murdering the Jews through a network of extermination camps. This plan was realized as Operation Reinhard.

Nothing is known for certain about the early planning for Sobibor in particular. Some historians have speculated that planning began as early as 1940, on the basis of a railway map from that year which omits several major cities but includes Sobibór and Bełżec. The earliest hard evidence for Nazi interest in the site comes from the testimony of local Poles, who noticed in Autumn 1941 that SS officers were surveying the land opposite the train station. When a worker at the station cafeteria asked one of the SS men what was being built, he replied that she would soon see and that it would be "a good laugh."

=== Camp construction ===
In March 1942, SS-Hauptsturmführer Richard Thomalla took over construction work at Sobibor, which had begun at an unknown earlier date. Thomalla was a former building contractor and committed Nazi whose service as an auxiliary police commander and adviser on Jewish forced labour had earned him a high-ranking position in Odilo Globočnik's construction department. Having previously overseen the construction of Bełżec extermination camp, he applied lessons learned there to Sobibor. Thomalla allotted a much larger area for Sobibor than he had for Bełżec, allowing more room to maneuver as well as providing space for all of the camp's facilities to be constructed within its perimeter.

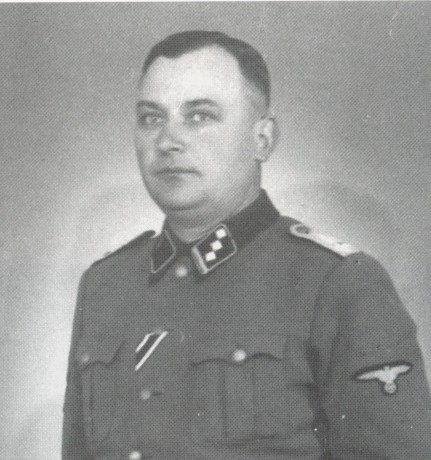
SS-Hauptsturmführer Richard Thomalla, who oversaw the initial construction of Sobibor

The camp incorporated several pre-war buildings including a post office, a forester's lodge, a forestry tower, and a chapel. The forester's lodge became the camp administration building, while the post office was used as lodging for the SS (though not, as commonly reported, for the commandant). The former post office, located near the railroad tracks, still stands today. The SS adapted the preexisting railroad infrastructure, adding an 800-meter railroad spur that ended inside the camp. This third set of tracks allowed regular rail traffic to continue uninterrupted while the camp unloaded transports of new prisoners. Some building materials were supplied by the SS Central Construction Office in Lublin, while others were procured from local sawmills and brickworks, as well as from the remains of demolished houses of Jews.

The first group of workers who built the camp were primarily locals from neighbouring villages and towns. It is unknown to what extent these were Polish or Jewish forced labourers. After Thomalla's arrival, the Jewish council in nearby Włodawa was ordered to send 150 Jews to assist in the construction of the camp. These workers were constantly harassed as they worked, and were shot if they showed signs of exhaustion. Most were murdered upon completion of construction, but two escaped back to Włodawa, where they attempted to warn the Jewish council about the camp and its purpose. Their warnings were met with disbelief.

The first gas chambers at Sobibor were built following the model of those at Belzec, but without any furnaces. To provide the carbon monoxide gas, SS-Scharführer Erich Fuchs acquired a heavy gasoline engine in Lemberg, disassembled from an armoured vehicle or a tractor. Fuchs installed the engine on a cement base at Sobibor in the presence of SS officers Floss, Bauer, Stangl, and Barbl, and connected the engine exhaust manifold to pipes leading to the gas chamber. In mid-April 1942, the Nazis conducted experimental gassings in the nearly finished camp. Christian Wirth, the commander of Bełżec and Inspector of Operation Reinhard, visited Sobibor to witness one of these gassings, which murdered thirty to forty Jewish women brought from the labour camp at Krychów.

The initial construction of Sobibor was finished by summer 1942, and a steady stream of prisoners began thereafter. However, the SS camp was continuously expanded and renovated throughout its existence. After only a few months of operation, the wooden walls of the gas chambers had absorbed too much sweat, urine, blood, and excrement to be cleanable. Thus, the gas chambers were demolished in the summer of 1942, and new larger ones were built made out of brick. Later that summer, the SS also embarked on a beautification project, instituting a more regular cleaning schedule for the barracks and stables, and expanding and landscaping the Vorlager to give it the appearance of a "Tyrolean village" much noted by later prisoners. When Sobibor ceased operations in mid-1943, the SS were part way through the construction of a munitions depot known as Lager IV.

=== Layout ===
Sobibor was surrounded by double barbed wire fences which were thatched with pine branches in order to block the view inside. At its southeast corner, it had two side-by-side gates; one for trains and another for foot traffic and vehicles. The site was divided into five compounds: the Vorlager and four Lagers numbered I–IV.

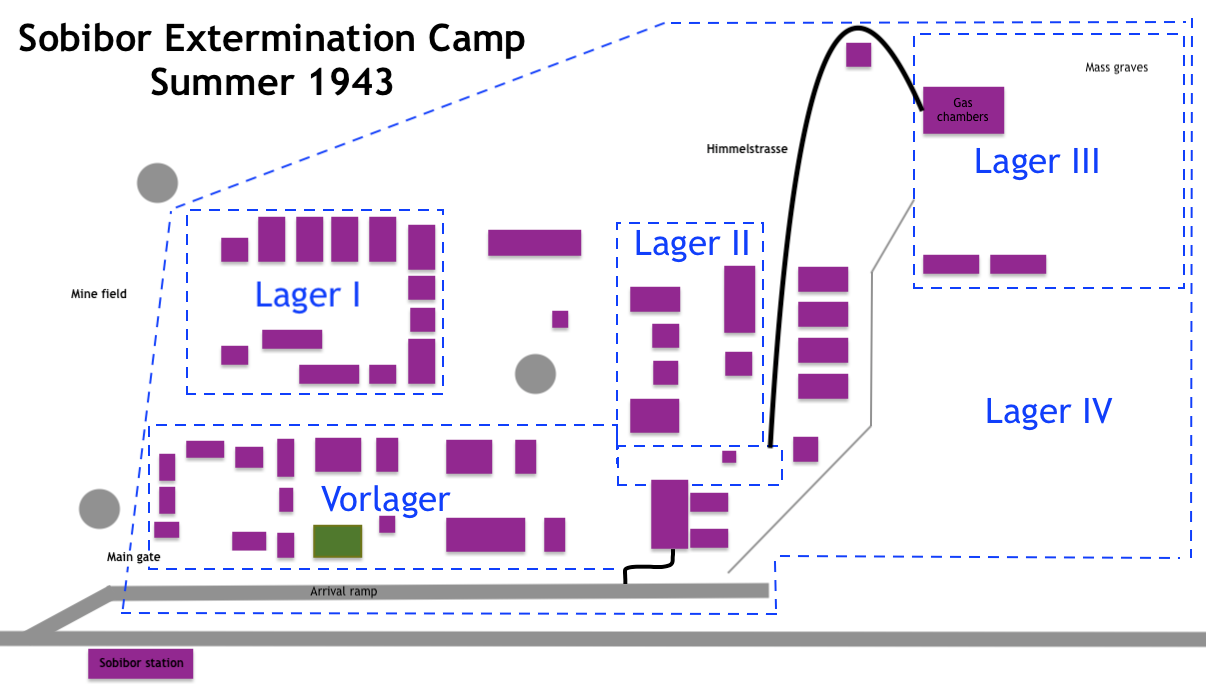
The layout of Sobibor, as it appeared in summer 1943

The Vorlager (front compound) contained living quarters and recreational buildings for the camp personnel. The SS officers lived in cottages with colorful names such as Lustiger Floh (the Merry Flea), Schwalbennest (the Swallow's Nest), and Gottes Heimat (God's Own Home). They also had a canteen, a bowling alley, a hairdresser, and a dentist, all staffed by Jewish prisoners. The watchmen, drawn from Soviet POWs, had separate barracks, and their own separate recreational buildings, including a hair salon and a canteen.

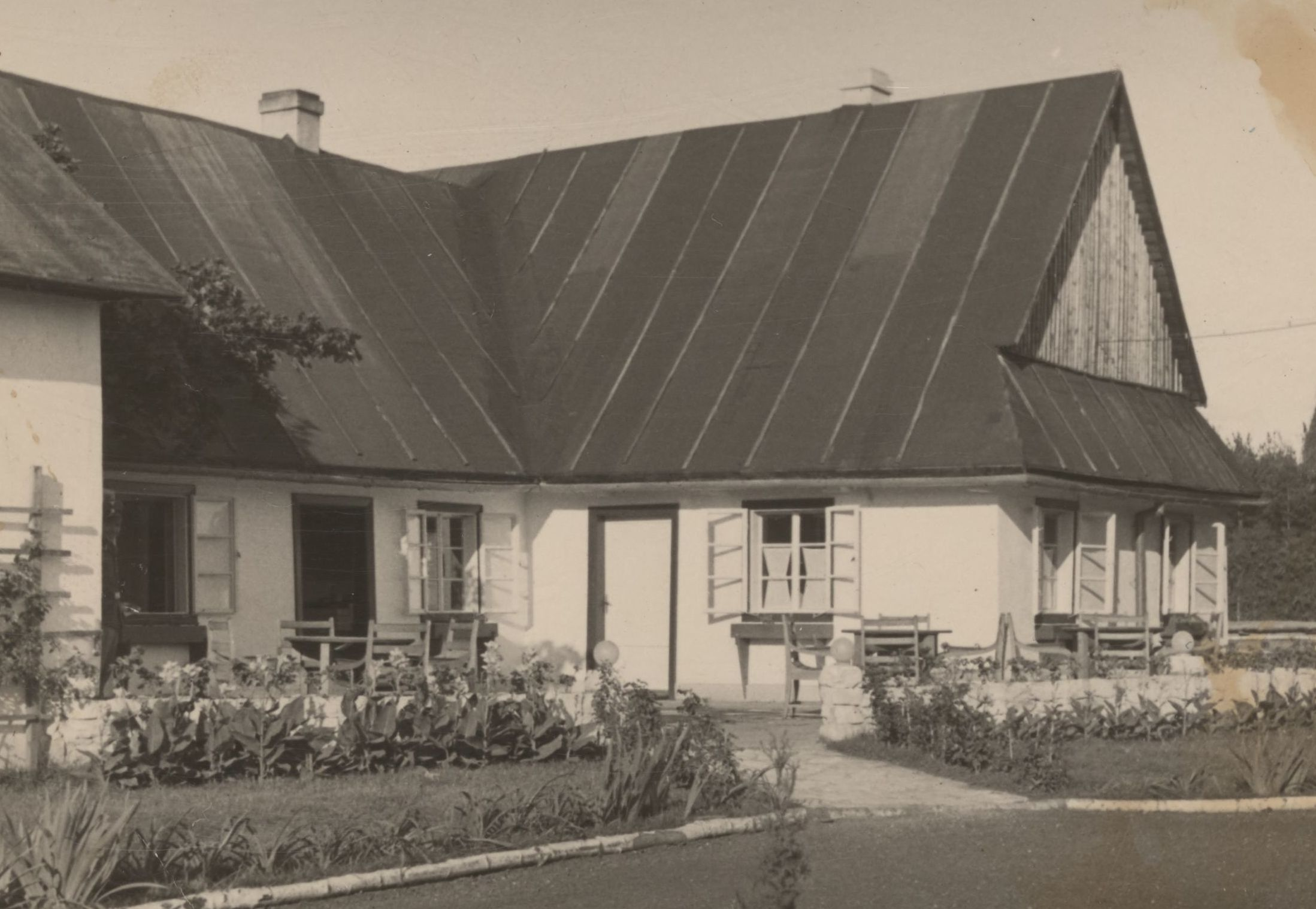
The Vorlager's quaint buildings such as the Merry Flea (pictured in summer 1943) helped conceal the purpose of the camp from new arrivals.

The Nazis paid great attention to the appearance of the Vorlager. It was neatly landscaped, with lawns and gardens, outdoor terraces, gravel-lined paths, and professionally painted signs. This idyllic appearance helped hide the nature of the camp from prisoners, who would arrive on the adjacent ramp. Survivor Jules Schelvis recalled feeling reassured upon arrival by the Vorlager's "Tyrolean cottage-like barracks with their bright little curtains and geraniums on the windowsills".

Lager I contained barracks and workshops for the prisoners. These workshops included a tailor's shop, a carpenter's shop, a mechanic's shop, a sign-painter's shop, and a bakery. Lager I was accessible only through the adjacent Vorlager, and its western boundary was made escape-proof with a water-filled trench.

Lager II was a larger multi-purpose compound. One subsection called the "Erbhof" contained the administration building, as well as a small farm. The administration building was a pre-war structure previously used by the local Polish forestry service. As part of the camp, this building was adapted to provide accommodation for some SS officers, storage for goods stolen from victims' luggage, as well as a pharmacy, whose contents were also taken from victims' luggage. On the farm, Jewish prisoners raised chickens, pigs, geese, fruits and vegetables for consumption by the SS men.

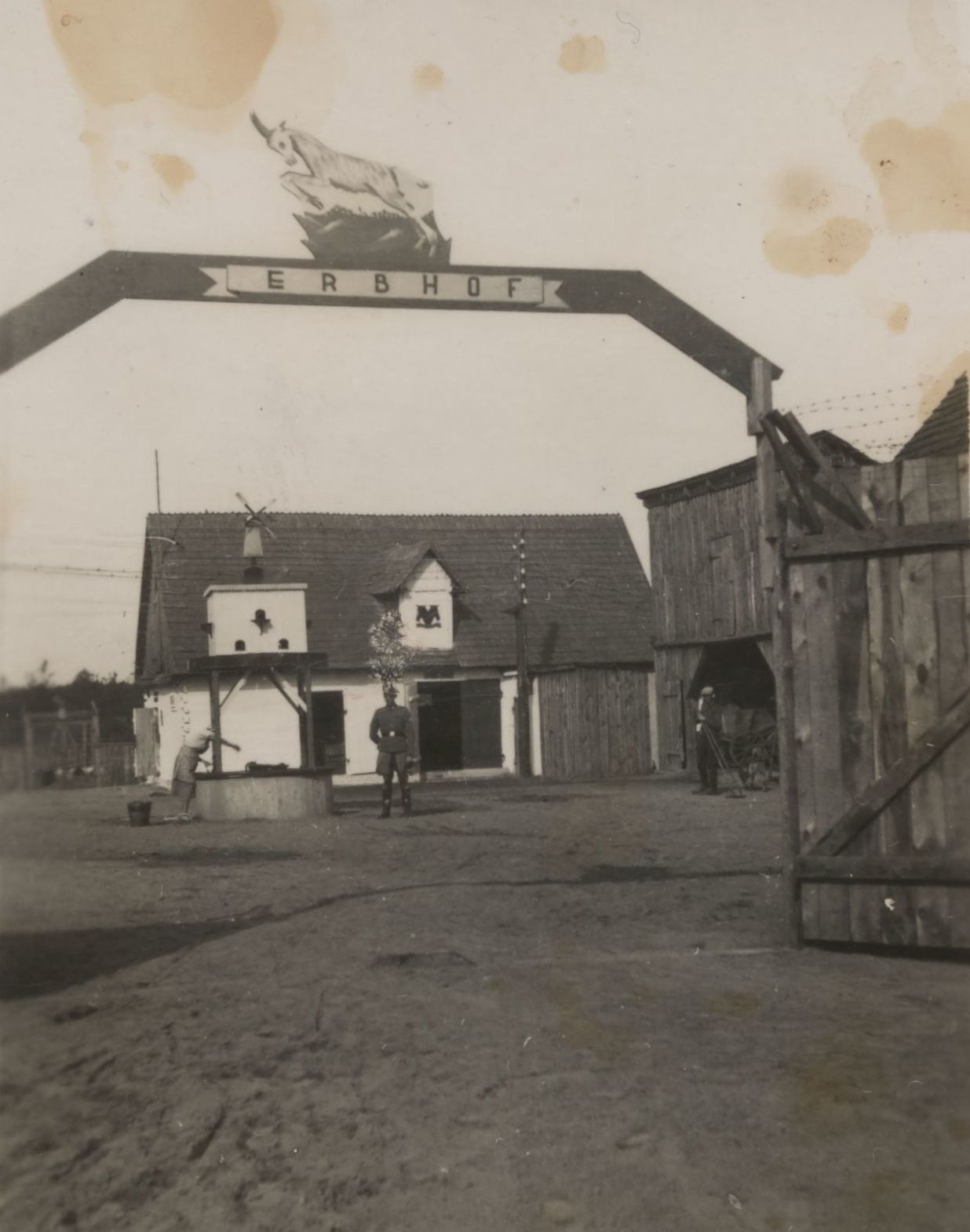
The entrance to the Erbhof in Lager II

Outside the Erbhof, Lager II contained facilities where new arrivals were prepared before being murdered. It contained the sorting barracks and other buildings used for storing items taken from the victims, including clothes, food, hair, gold, and other valuables. At the east end was a yard where new arrivals had their luggage taken from them and were forced to undress. This area was beautified with flower beds to hide the camp's purpose from newcomers. This yard led into the narrow enclosed path called the Himmelstrasse (road to heaven) or the Schlauch (tube), which led straight to the gas chambers in Lager III. The Himmelstrasse was covered on both sides by fences woven with pine branches.

Lager III was the extermination area. It was isolated from the rest of the camp, set back in a clearing in the forest and surrounded by its own thatched fence. Prisoners from Lager I were not allowed near it, and were killed if they were suspected of having seen inside. Due to a lack of eyewitness testimony, little is known about Lager III beyond the fact that it contained gas chambers, mass graves, and special separate housing for the Sonderkommando prisoners who worked there.

Lager IV (also called the Nordlager) was added in July 1943, and was still under construction at the time of the revolt. Located in a heavily wooded area to the north of the other camps, it was being developed as a munitions depot for processing arms taken from Red Army soldiers.

== Life in the camp ==
=== Prisoner life ===
Because Sobibor was an extermination camp, the only prisoners who lived there were the roughly 600 slave labourers forced to assist in the operation of the camp. While survivors of Auschwitz use the term "selected" to mean being selected for murder, at Sobibor being "selected" meant being selected to live, at least temporarily. The harsh conditions in the camp took the lives of most new arrivals within a few months.

==== Work ====
Prisoners worked from 6:00 am to 6:00 pm, with a short lunch break in the middle. Sundays were designated as half days, but this policy was not always observed. The prisoner population included many labourers with specialized skills such as goldsmithing, painting, gardening, or tailoring. While such prisoners were officially spared death only to support the camp's primary operations, much of their labour was in fact diverted for the SS officers' personal enrichment. Renowned Dutch Jewish painter Max van Dam was nominally kept as a sign painter, but the SS also forced him to paint landscapes, portraits, and hagiographic images of Hitler. Similarly, Shlomo Szmajzner was placed in charge of the machine shop in order to conceal his work making gold jewelry for SS officers. Prisoners with specialized skills were considered especially valuable and were afforded privileges not available to others.

Those without specialized skills performed a variety of other jobs. Many worked in the Lager II sorting barracks, where they were forced to comb through luggage left behind by gas chamber victims, repackaging valuable items as "charity gifts" for German civilians. These workers could also be called on to serve in the railway brigade which greeted new prisoners. The railway brigade was considered a relatively appealing job, since it gave famished workers access to luggage which often contained food. Younger prisoners commonly worked as putzers, cleaning for the Nazis and the watchmen and attending to their needs. A particularly horrifying job was that of the "barbers" who cut the hair of women on their way to the gas chamber. This job was often forced upon young male prisoners in an attempt to humiliate both them and the naked women whose hair they were cutting. Armed watchmen supervised the process in order to ensure that barbers did not respond to victims' questions or pleas.

In Lager III, a special unit of Jewish prisoners was forced to assist in the extermination process. Its tasks included removing bodies, searching cavities for valuables, scrubbing blood and excrement from the gas chambers, and cremating the corpses. Because the prisoners who belonged to this unit were direct witnesses to genocide, they were strictly isolated from other prisoners and the SS would periodically liquidate those unit members who had not already succumbed to the work's physical and psychological toll. Since no workers from Lager III survived, nothing is known about their lives or experiences.

When construction of Lager IV began in the summer of 1943, the Nazis assembled a forest commando who worked there cutting timber for heat, cooking, and cremation pyres.

Prisoners struggled with the fact that their labour made them complicit in mass murder, albeit indirectly and unwillingly. Many committed suicide. Others endured, finding ways to resist, if only symbolically. Common symbolic forms of resistance included praying for the dead, observing Jewish religious rites, and singing songs of resistance. However, some prisoners found small ways of materially fighting back. While working in the sorting shed, Saartje Wijnberg would surreptitiously damage fine items of clothing to prevent them from being sent to Germany. After the war, Esther Terner recounted what she and Zelda Metz did when they found an unattended pot of soup in the Nazis' canteen: "We spit in it and washed our hands in it... Don't ask me what else we did to that soup... And they ate it."

==== Social relations ====
Prisoners found it difficult to forge personal relationships. This was in part due to the constant turnover in the camp population, but also to an atmosphere of mutual distrust which was often exacerbated by national or linguistic divisions. Dutch Jews were particularly subject to derision and suspicion because of their assimilated manners and limited Yiddish. German Jews faced the same suspicion as the Dutch, with the added implication that they might identify more with their captors than with their fellow prisoners. When social groups did form, they were generally based on family ties or shared nationality, and were completely closed off to outsiders. Chaim Engel even found himself shunned by fellow Polish Jews after he began a romantic relationship with Dutch-born Saartje Wijnberg. These divisions had dire consequences for many prisoners from Western Europe, who were not trusted with crucial information about goings-on in the camp.

Because of the expectation of imminent death, prisoners adopted a day-at-a-time outlook. Crying was rare and evenings were often spent enjoying whatever of life was left. As revolt organizer Leon Feldhendler recounted after the war, "The Jews only had one goal: carpe diem, and in this they simply went wild." Prisoners sang and danced in the evenings and sexual or romantic relations were frequent. Some of these affairs were likely transactional or coerced, especially those between female prisoners and kapos, but others were driven by genuine bonds. Two couples that met in Sobibor were married after the war. The Nazis allowed and even encouraged an atmosphere of merriment, going so far as to recruit prisoners for a choir at gunpoint. Many prisoners interpreted these efforts as attempts by the Nazis to keep the prisoners docile and to prevent them from thinking about escape.

Prisoners had a pecking order largely determined by one's usefulness to the Germans. As survivor Toivi Blatt observed, there were three categories of prisoners: the expendable "drones" whose lives were entirely at the mercy of the SS, the privileged workers whose special jobs provided some relative comforts, and finally the artisans whose specialized knowledge made them indispensable and earned them preferential treatment. Moreover, as at other camps, the Nazis appointed kapos to keep their fellow prisoners in line. Kapos carried out a variety of supervisory duties and enforced their commands with whips. Kapos were involuntary appointees, and they varied widely in how they responded to the psychological pressures of their position. Oberkapo Moses Sturm was nicknamed "Mad Moisz" for his mercurial temperament. He would beat prisoners horrifically without provocation and then later apologize hysterically. He talked constantly of escape, sometimes merely berating the other prisoners for their passivity, other times attempting to formulate actionable plans. Sturm was executed after being betrayed by a lower ranking kapo named Herbert Naftaniel. Naftaniel, nicknamed "Berliner", was promoted to Oberkapo and became a notorious figure in the camp. He viewed himself as German rather than Jewish, and began a reign of terror which came to an end shortly before the revolt, when a group of prisoners beat him to death with SS-Oberscharfuhrer Karl Frenzel's permission.

Despite these divisions in the camp, prisoners found ways to support each other. Sick and injured prisoners were given clandestine food as well as medicine and sanitary supplies stolen from the camp pharmacy. Healthy prisoners were expected to cover for sick prisoners who would otherwise be killed. The camp nurse Kurt Ticho developed a method of falsifying his records so that sick prisoners could take more than the allotted three day recovery period. Members of the railway brigade attempted to warn new arrivals of their impending murder but were met with incredulity. The most successful act of solidarity in the camp was the revolt on 14 October 1943, which was expressly planned so that all of the prisoners in the camp would have at least some chance of escape.

==== Health and living conditions ====
Prisoners suffered from sleep deprivation, malnourishment, and the physical and emotional toll of grueling labour and constant beatings. Lice, skin infections, and respiratory infections were common, and typhoid swept the camp on occasion. When Sobibor first opened, prisoners were regarded as expendable and shot at the first sign of illness or injury. After a few months, the SS grew concerned that the enormous death rate was limiting the camp's efficiency. In order to increase the continuity of its labour force and alleviate the need to constantly train new workers, the SS instituted a new policy allowing incapacitated prisoners three days to recover. Those still unable to work after three days were shot.

Food in the camp was extremely limited. As at other Lublin district camps, prisoners were given about 200 grams of bread for breakfast along with Ersatz coffee. Lunch was typically a thin soup sometimes with some potatoes or horse meat. Dinner could once again be simply coffee. Prisoners forced to live on these rations found their personalities changing due to hunger. Others supplemented these rations surreptitiously, for instance by helping themselves to food from victims' luggage while working in the sorting barracks or in the railway brigade. A barter system developed in the camp, which included not only prisoners but also the watchmen, who would serve as intermediaries between the Jews and local peasants, exchanging jewels and cash from the sorting barracks for food and liquor in exchange for a large cut.

Most prisoners had little or no access to hygiene and sanitation. There were no showers in Lager I and clean water was scarce. Although clothing could be washed or replaced from the sorting barracks, the camp was so thoroughly infested that there was little point. However, some prisoners worked in areas of the camp such as the laundry which gave them occasional access to better hygiene.

=== Camp personnel ===
The personnel at Sobibor included a small cadre of German and Austrian SS officers, and a much larger group of watchmen, generally of Soviet origin.

==== SS garrison ====
Sobibor was staffed by a rotating group of eighteen to twenty-two German and Austrian SS officers. The SS officers were generally from lower-middle-class backgrounds, having previously worked as merchants, artisans, farmhands, nurses, and policemen. Almost all the Sobibor SS officers had previously served in Aktion T4, the Nazi forced euthanasia program. In particular, a large contingent had previously served together at Hartheim Euthanasia Centre. Many practices developed at Hartheim were continued at Sobibor, including methods for deceiving victims on the way to the gas chambers. Before beginning work at Sobibor, they had met with Odilo Globočnik in Lublin and signed a confidentiality agreement. Over the course of its operation, roughly 100 SS officers served at Sobibor.

When Sobibor first opened, its commandant was SS-Obersturmführer Franz Stangl, a meticulous organizer who worked to increase the efficiency of the extermination process. Stangl had little interaction with the prisoners, with the exception of Shlomo Szmajzner who recalled Stangl as a vain man who stood out for "his obvious pleasure in his work and his situation. None of the others—although they were, in different ways, so much worse than he—showed this to such an extent. He had this perpetual smile on his face." Stangl was transferred to Treblinka in August 1942, and his job at Sobibor was filled by SS-Obersturmführer Franz Reichleitner. Reichleitner was an alcoholic and a determined anti-semite who took little interest in what went on in the camp aside from the extermination process. SS-Untersturmführer Johann Niemann served as the camp's deputy commandant.

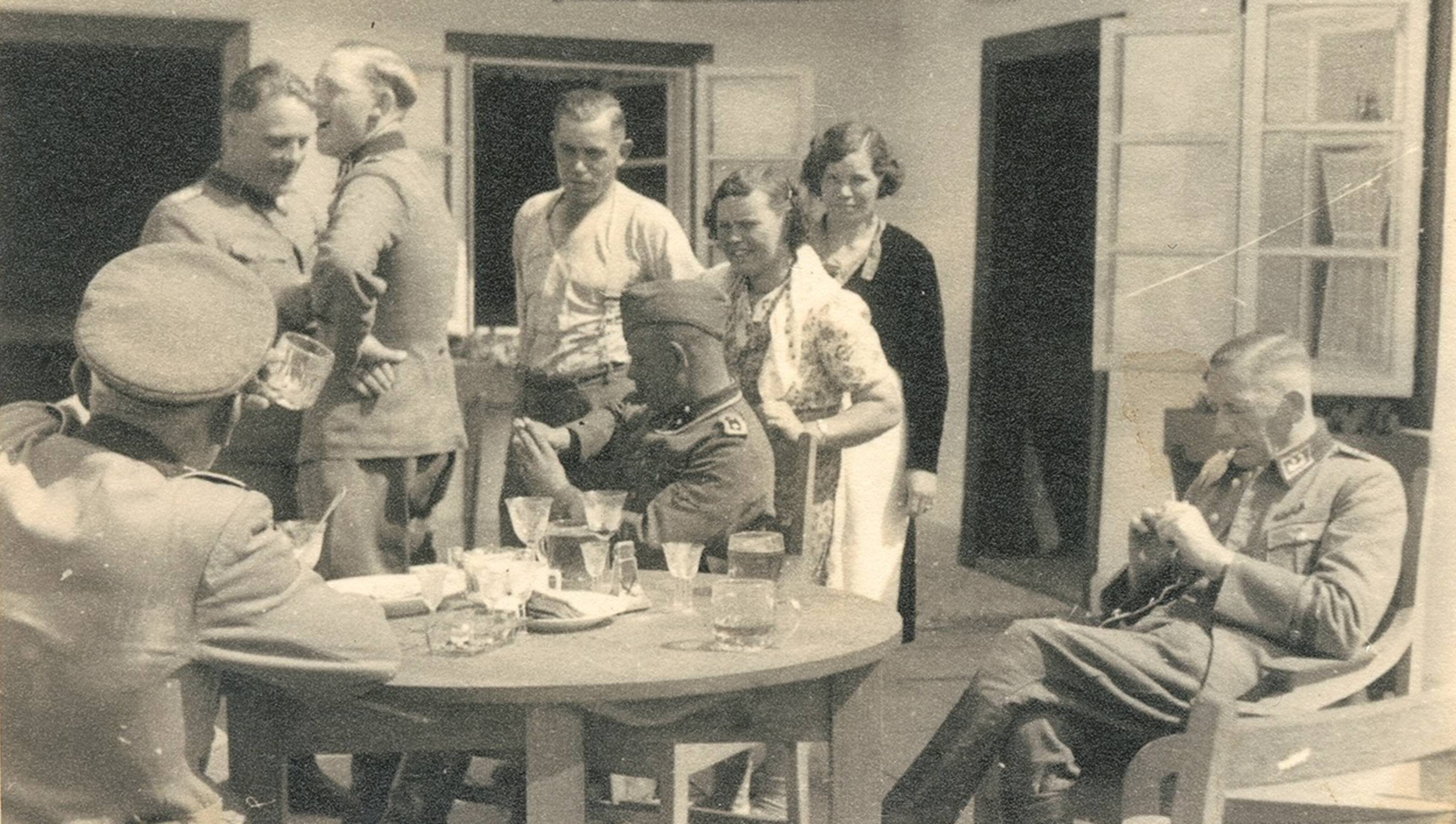
SS officers entertaining a customs official on the terrace of the Merry Flea. The high quality drinking glasses were likely stolen from gas chamber victims. (Left-to-right: Daschel, Reichleitner, Niemann, Schulze, Bauer, two unknown women, and the customs official).

Day-to-day operations were generally handled by SS-Oberscharfuhrer Gustav Wagner, the most feared and hated man in Sobibor. Prisoners regarded him as brutal, demanding, unpredictable, observant, and sadistic. They referred to him as "The Beast" and "Wolf". Reporting to Wagner was SS-Oberscharfuhrer Karl Frenzel, who oversaw Lager I and acted as the camp's "judicial authority". Kurt Bolender and Hubert Gomerski oversaw Lager III, the extermination area, while SS-Oberscharfuhrer Erich Bauer and SS-Scharführer Josef Vallaster typically directed the gassing procedure itself.

The SS men considered their job appealing. At Sobibor, they could enjoy creature comforts not available to soldiers fighting on the Eastern Front. The officer's compound in the camp had a canteen, a bowling alley, and a barber shop. The "officers' country club" was a short distance away, on nearby Perepsza Lake. Each SS man was allowed three weeks of leave every three months, which they could spend at Haus Schoberstein, an SS-owned resort in the Austrian town of Weissenbach on Lake Attersee. Moreover, the job could be lucrative: each officer received base pay of 58 ℛℳ per month, plus a daily allowance of 18 ℛℳ, and special bonuses including a Judenmordzulage (Jew murder supplement). In all, an officer at Sobibor could earn 600 ℛℳ per month in pay. In addition to the official compensation, a job at Sobibor offered endless opportunities for the SS officers to covertly enrich themselves by exploiting the labour and stealing the possessions of their victims. In one case, the SS officers enslaved a 15-year-old goldsmith prodigy named Shlomo Szmajzner, who made them rings and monograms from gold extracted from the teeth of gas chamber victims.

During post-war trials, SS officers from all of the Operation Reinhard camps claimed that they would have been executed if they had not participated in the murders. However, the judges in the Treblinka trial could not find any evidence of SS officers being executed for desertion, and at least one Sobibor officer (Alfred Ittner) successfully got himself transferred.

==== Watchmen ====
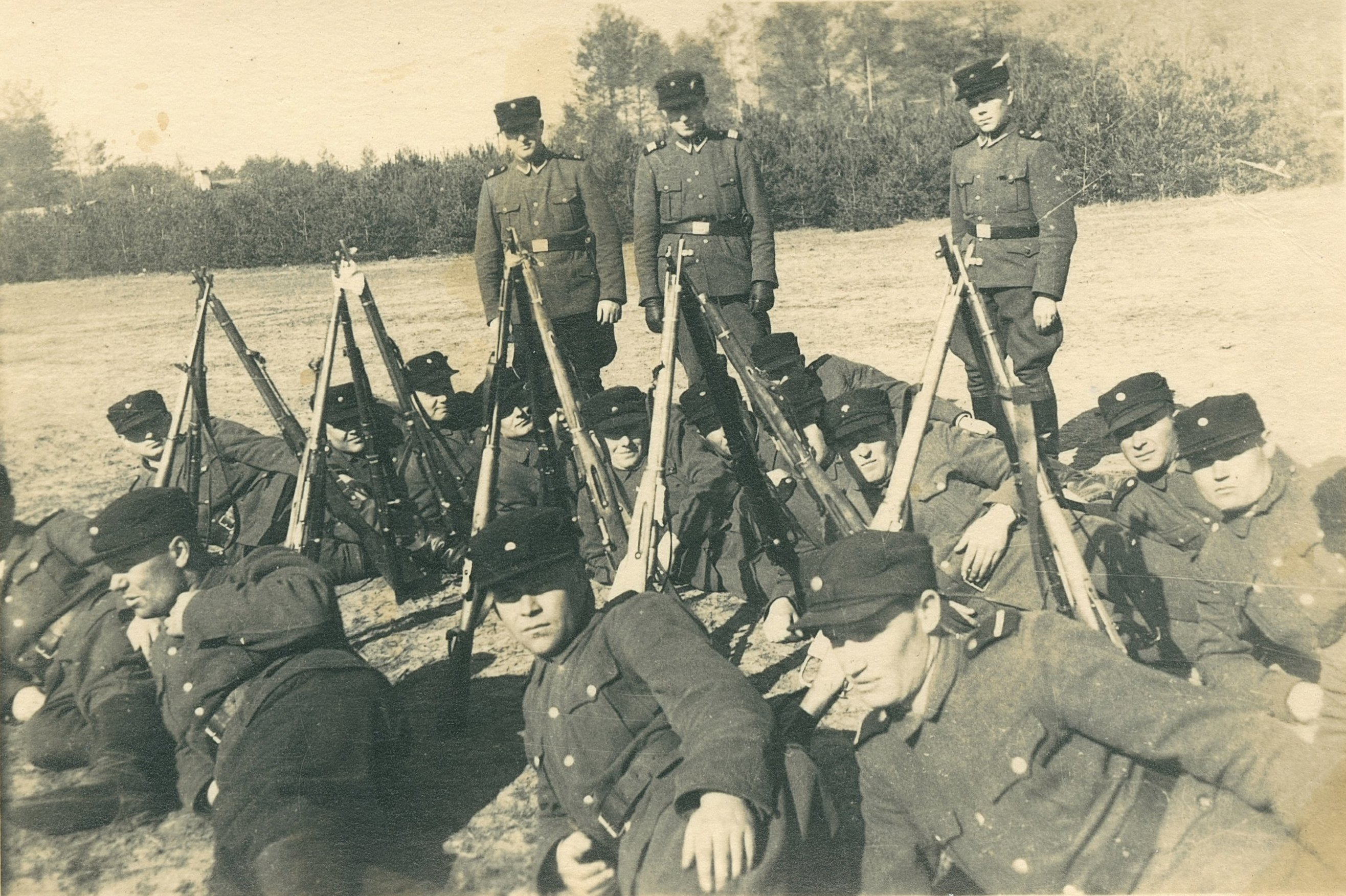
Watchmen in front of Lager III. The roof of the gas chamber is visible in the background.

Sobibor was guarded by approximately 400 watchmen. Survivors often refer to them as blackies, Askaris, or Ukrainians (even though many were not Ukrainian). They were captured Soviet prisoners of war who had volunteered for the SS in order to escape the abominable conditions in Nazi POW camps. Watchmen were nominally guards, but they were also expected to supervise work details and perform manual labour including punishments and executions. They also took an active part in the extermination process, unloading transports and escorting the victims into the gas chambers. Watchmen dressed in mixed-and-matched pieces of Nazi, Soviet, and Polish uniforms, often dyed black (giving rise to the term "blackies"). They received pay and rations similar to those of Waffen-SS, as well as a family allowance and holiday leave.

Although the watchmen inspired terror among the prisoners, their loyalty to the SS was not unwavering. They played an active role in Sobibor's underground barter economy, and drank copiously despite being prohibited from doing so. The SS officers were wary of the watchmen, and limited their access to ammunition. Watchmen were also transferred frequently between different camps in order to prevent them from building up local contacts or knowledge of the surrounding area. After the prisoner uprising, the SS feared that the watchmen would themselves revolt, and sent them all back to Trawniki under armed guard. Their fears proved correct, as the watchmen killed their SS escort and fled.

=== Interactions between prisoners and perpetrators ===
Prisoners lived in constant fear of their captors. They were punished for transgressions as inconsequential as smoking a cigarette, resting while working, and showing insufficient enthusiasm when forced to sing. Punishment was used not only to enforce the official camp rules, but also the guards' personal whims. The most common punishment was flogging. SS officers carried 80 centimeter whips which had been specially made by slave labour prisoners using leather taken from the luggage of gas chamber victims. Even when flogging was not in itself lethal, it would prove a death sentence if it left the recipient too injured to work. Many survivors remember an unusually large and aggressive St. Bernard named Barry that Kurt Bolender and Paul Groth would sic on prisoners. In the summer of 1943, SS-Oberscharfuhrer Gustav Wagner and SS-Oberscharfuhrer Hubert Gomerski formed a penal brigade, consisting of prisoners who were forced to work while running. Prisoners were assigned to the penal brigade for a period of three days, but most died before their time was up.

The SS exercised absolute authority over the prisoners and treated them as a source of entertainment. They forced prisoners to sing while working, while marching, and even during public executions. Some survivor testimonies recount prisoners performing mock cockfights for the SS, with their arms tied behind their backs. Others recount being forced to sing demeaning songs such as "I am a Jew with a big nose". Female prisoners were sexually abused on several occasions. For instance, at a postwar trial, Erich Bauer testified that two Austrian Jewish actresses, named Ruth and Gisela, were confined in an SS barracks and gang raped by SS-Oberscharfuhrer Kurt Bolender and SS-Oberscharfuhrer Gustav Wagner, among others.

Unique among the SS officers, Unterscharführer Johann Klier was known to be relatively humane, and several survivors testified on his behalf at his trial. In an interview with Richard Rashke, Esther Terner commented "I don't even know why he was in Sobibor ... even the other Nazis picked on him."

Prisoners regarded the watchmen as the most dangerous among the Sobibor staff, their cruelty surpassing that of the SS officers. In the words of historian Marek Bem, "It can be said that the Ukrainian guards' cynicism was in no way inferior to the SS men's premeditation." However, some individual watchmen were sympathetic to the Jews, doing the minimum possible while on duty and even assisting with prisoners' escape attempts. In one documented instance, two watchmen named Victor Kisiljow and Wasyl Zischer escaped with six Jewish prisoners, but were betrayed and killed.

Prisoners developed complex relationships with their tormenters. In order to avoid the most extreme cruelties, many tried to ingratiate themselves with the SS officers, for instance by choosing maudlin German folk songs when ordered to sing. In other cases, prisoners found themselves unwillingly favored. SS-Oberscharfuhrer Karl Frenzel took a liking to Saartje Wijnberg, constantly smiling at her and teasingly referring to her and Chaim Engel as "bride and groom". He was protective towards her, excusing her from torturous work inflicted on other Dutch prisoners and sparing her when he liquidated the sick barracks on 11 October 1943. She struggled with this attention and felt angry at herself when she noticed herself feeling grateful to him. At his trial, Frenzel declared "I actually do believe the Jews even liked me!" though both prisoners and other SS officers regarded him as exceptionally cruel and brutal. Similarly, camp commandant SS-Obersturmführer Franz Stangl "made a pet" of the 14-year-old goldsmith Shlomo Szmajzner and regarded his post-war trial testimony as a personal betrayal. Stangl particularly objected to the implication that his habit of bringing Smajzner sausages on the sabbath had been a deliberate attempt to torment the starving teenager. Szmajzner himself was not sure of Stangl's intentions: "it's perfectly true that he seemed to like me... still, it was funny, wasn't it, that he always brought it on a Friday evening?"

== Extermination ==
=== Killing process ===
On either 16 or 18 May 1942, Sobibor became fully operational and began mass gassings. Trains entered the railway siding with the unloading platform, and the Jews on board were told they were in a transit camp. They were forced to hand over their valuables, were separated by sex and told to undress. The nude women and girls, recoiling in shame, were met by the Jewish workers who cut off their hair in a mere half a minute. Among the Friseur (barbers) was Toivi Blatt (age 15). The condemned prisoners, formed into groups, were led along the 100-metre (330 ft) long "Road to Heaven" (Himmelstrasse) to the gas chambers, where they were murdered using carbon monoxide released from the exhaust pipes of a tank engine. During his trial, SS-Oberscharführer Kurt Bolender described the killing operations as follows:

Before the Jews undressed, SS-Oberscharführer Hermann Michel made a speech to them. On these occasions, he used to wear a white coat to give the impression he was a physician. Michel announced to the Jews that they would be sent to work. But before this they would have to take baths and undergo disinfection, so as to prevent the spread of diseases. After undressing, the Jews were taken through the "Tube", by an SS man leading the way, with five or six Ukrainians at the back hastening the Jews along. After the Jews entered the gas chambers, the Ukrainians closed the doors. The motor was switched on by the former Soviet soldier Emil Kostenko and by the German driver Erich Bauer from Berlin. After the gassing, the doors were opened, and the corpses were removed by the Sonderkommando members.

Local Jews were delivered in absolute terror, many amongst them screaming and pounding. Foreign Jews, on the other hand were treated with deceitful politeness. Passengers from Westerbork, Netherlands, had a comfortable journey. There were Jewish doctors and nurses attending them and no shortage of food or medical supplies on the train. To them, Sobibor did not seem like a genuine threat.

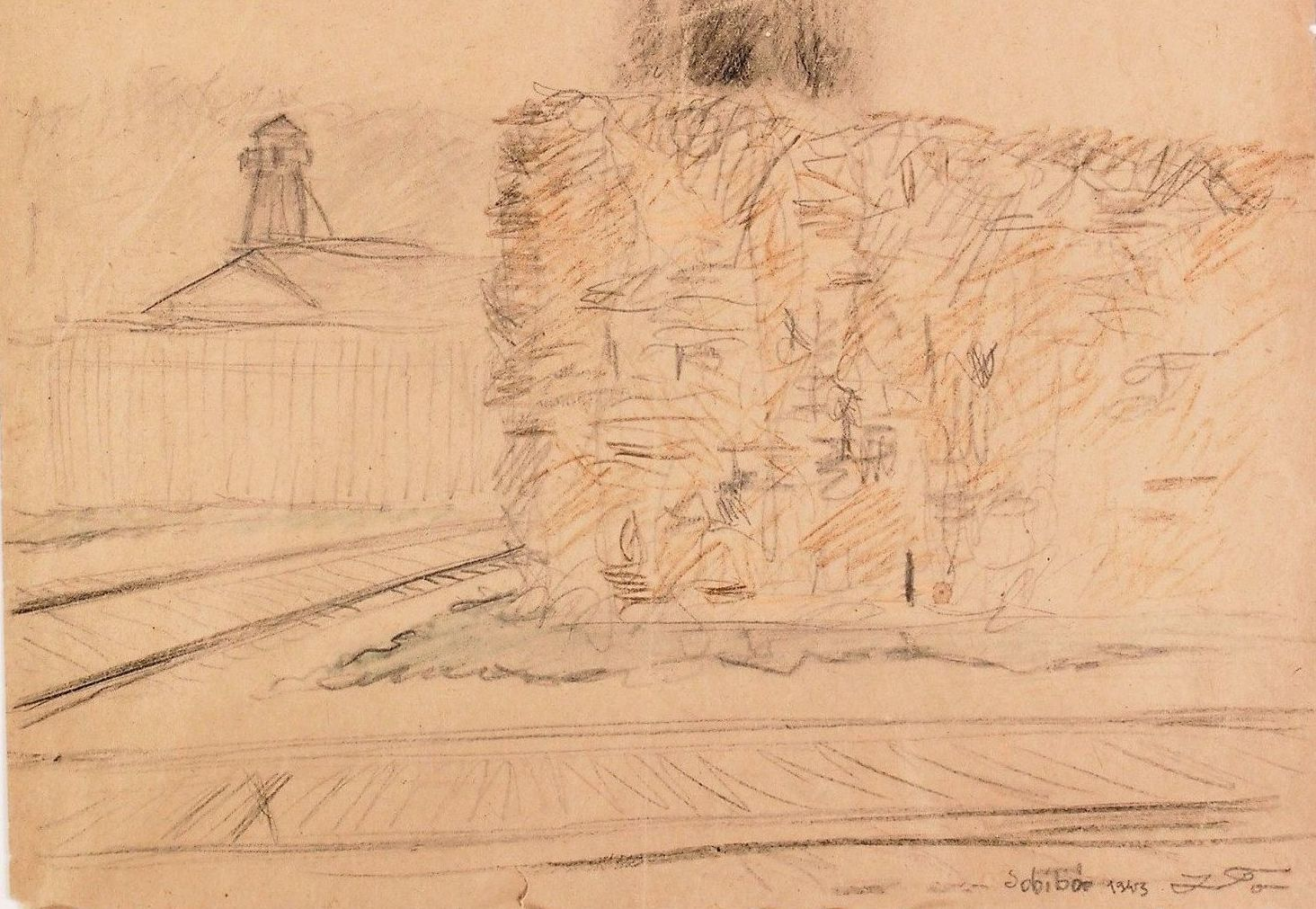
A contemporary drawing of the train tracks leading into Sobibor

The non-Polish victims included 18-year-old Helga Deen from the Netherlands, whose diary was discovered in 2004; the writer Else Feldmann from Austria; Dutch Olympic gold medalist gymnasts Helena Nordheim, Ans Polak, and Jud Simons; gym coach Gerrit Kleerekoper; and magician Michel Velleman.

After the killing in the gas chambers, the corpses were collected by Sonderkommandos and taken to mass graves or cremated in the open air. The burial pits were 50–60 metres (160–200 ft) long, 10–15 metres (33–49 ft) wide, and 5–7 metres (16–23 ft) deep, with sloping sandy walls in order to facilitate the burying of corpses.

=== Death toll ===
Between 170,000 and 250,000 Jews were murdered at Sobibor. The precise death toll is unknown, since no complete record survives. The most commonly cited figure of 250,000 was first proposed in 1947 by a Polish judge named Zbigniew Łukaszewicz, who interviewed survivors, railwaymen, and external witnesses to estimate of the frequency and capacity of the transports. Later research has reached the same figure drawing on more specific documentation, although other recent studies have given lower estimates such as Jules Schelvis's figure of 170,165. According to historian Marek Bem, "The range of scientific research into this question shows how rudimentary our current knowledge is of the number of victims of this extermination camp."

One major source which can be used to estimate the death toll is the Höfle Telegram, a collection of SS cables which give precise numbers of "recorded arrivals" at each of the Operation Reinhard camps prior to 31 December 1942. Identical numbers are found in the Korherr Report, another surviving Nazi document. These sources both report 101,370 arrivals at Sobibor during the year 1942, but the meaning of this figure is open to interpretation. Some scholars, such as Bem, suggest that it refers only to Jews arriving from within the General Government. However, others such as Jules Schelvis take it as a record of the total arrivals during that year and thus combine it with an estimate of the killings in 1943 to reach a total estimate.

Other key sources of information include records of particular transports sent to Sobibor. In some cases, this information is detailed and systematic. For instance, the Dutch Institute for War, Holocaust and Genocide Studies archive contains precise records of each transport sent to Sobibor from the Netherlands, totaling 34,313 individuals. In other cases, transports are only known through incidental evidence, such as when one of its passengers was among the survivors.

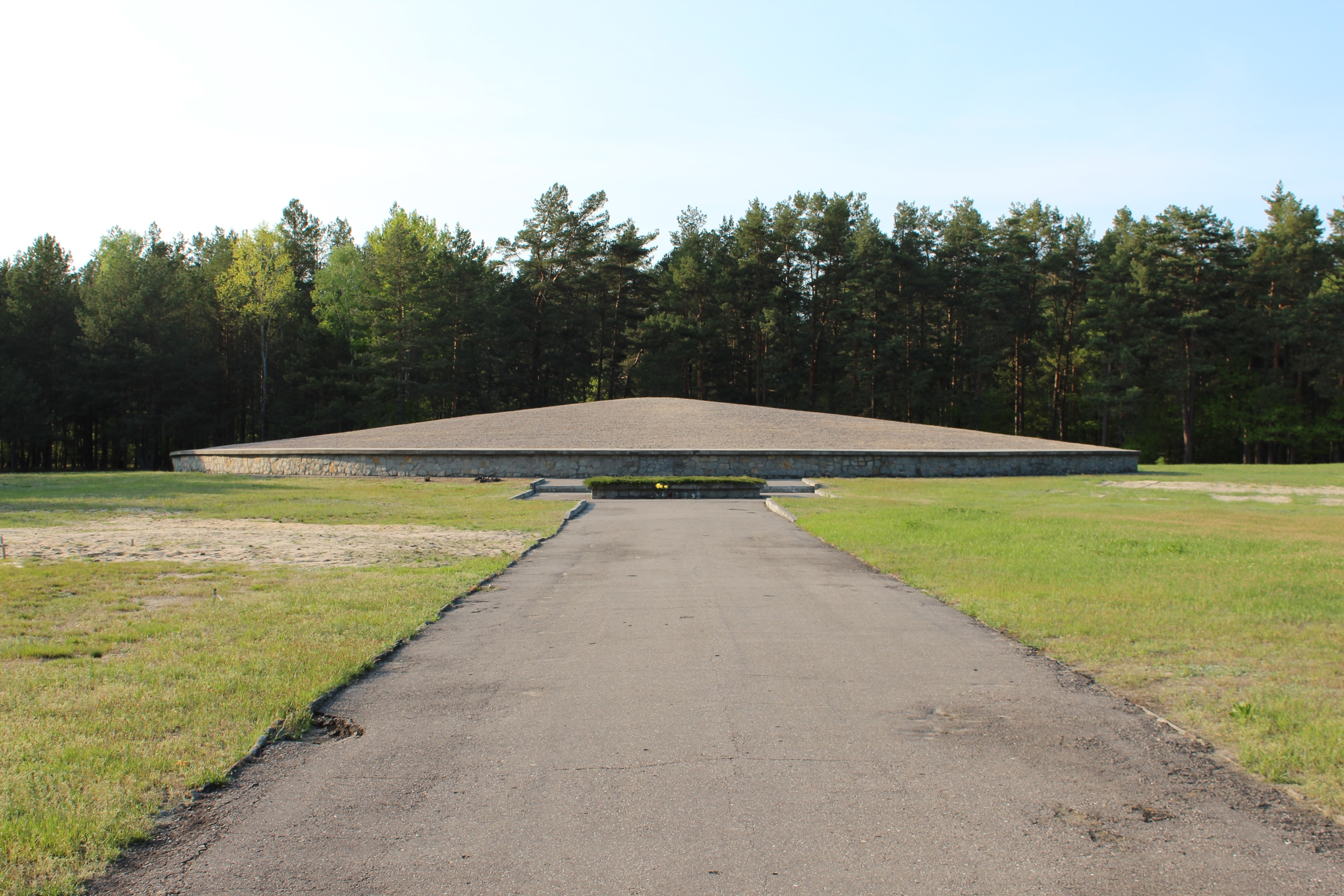
The "Memory Mound"

Many of the difficulties in reaching a firm death toll arise from the incompleteness of surviving evidence. Records of deportations are more likely to exist when they took place by train, meaning that estimates likely undercount the number of prisoners brought on trucks, horse-drawn carts, or by foot. Moreover, even records of trains appear to contain gaps. For example, while a letter from Albert Ganzenmüller to Karl Wolff mentions past trains from Warsaw to Sobibor, no itineraries survive. On the other hand, estimates may count small numbers of individuals as Sobibor victims who in fact died elsewhere, or conceivably even survived. This is because small groups of new arrivals were occasionally selected to work in one of the nearby labour camps, rather than being gassed immediately as was the norm. For instance, when Jules Schelvis was deported to Sobibor on a transport carrying 3,005 Dutch Jews, he was one of 81 men selected to work in Dorohucza, and the only one to survive. Although these instances were rare and some are documented well enough to be accounted for, they could still have a small cumulative effect on estimates of the death toll.

Other figures have been given which differ from what is indicated by reliable historical evidence. Numbers as high as 3 million appear in reports requested immediately after the war by the Central Commission for the Investigation of German Crimes in Poland. During the Sobibor trials in the 1960s, the judges adopted a figure of 152,000 victims, though they stressed that this was not a complete estimate but rather a minimum limited by the procedural rules concerning evidence. Survivors have suggested numbers of victims significantly higher than what historians accept. Many recall a camp rumour that Heinrich Himmler's visit in February 1943 was intended to celebrate the millionth victim, and others suggest figures even higher. Bem suggests that survivors' estimates disagree with the record because they reflect "the state of their emotions back then, as well as the drama and the scale of tragedy which happened in Sobibor". Another high figure comes from one of the perpetrators, SS-Oberscharfuhrer Erich Bauer, who recalled his colleagues expressing regret that Sobibor "came last" in the competition among the Operation Reinhard camps, having claimed only 350,000 lives.The Central Database at Yad Vashem Death Place Sobibor lists 46,395 names.

== Uprising ==
On the afternoon of 14 October 1943, members of the Sobibor underground covertly killed eleven of the on-duty SS men and then led roughly 300 prisoners to freedom. This revolt was one of three uprisings by Jewish prisoners in extermination camps, the others being those at Treblinka extermination camp on 2 August 1943 and at Auschwitz-Birkenau on 7 October 1944.

=== Lead up ===
In the summer of 1943, rumors began to circulate that Sobibor would soon cease operations. The prisoners understood that this would mean certain death for them all, since the final cohort of Bełżec prisoners had been murdered at Sobibor after dismantling their own camp. The Sobibor prisoners knew this since the Bełżec prisoners had sewn messages into their clothing:

We worked at Bełżec for one year and did not know where we would be sent next. They said it would be Germany... Now we are in Sobibór and know what to expect. Be aware that you will be killed also! Avenge us!

An escape committee formed in response to these rumors. Their leader was Leon Feldhendler, a former member of the Judenrat in Żółkiewka. His job in the sorting barracks gave him access to additional food, sparing him from the hunger which robbed other workers of their mental acuity. However, the escape committee made minimal progress that summer. In light of previous betrayals and the ever-looming threat of collective punishment, they needed to keep their discussions limited to roughly seven Polish Jews, but this insularity severely limited their capacity to form a plan, since none of their members had the military or strategic experience necessary to carry out a mass escape. By late September, their discussions had stalled.

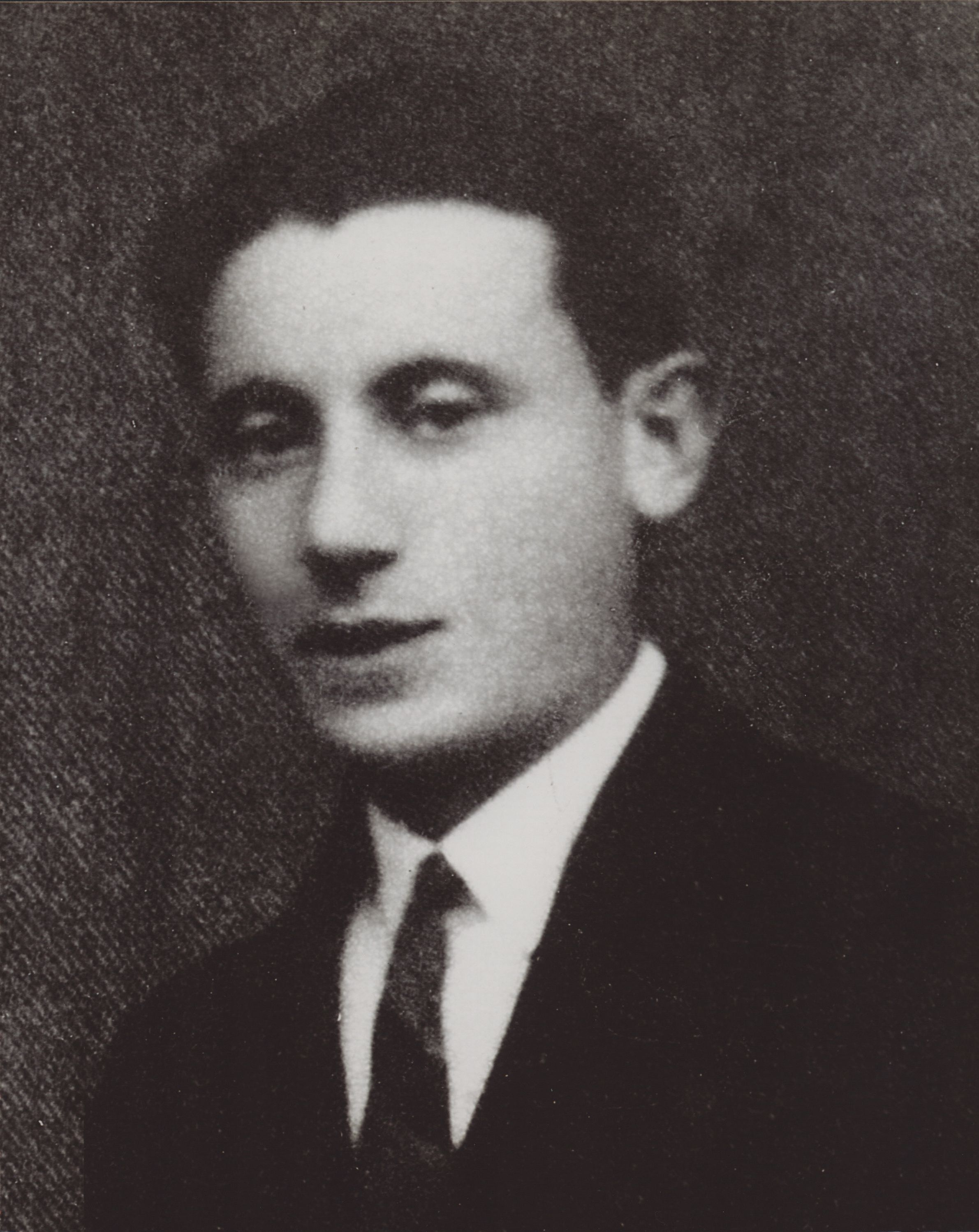
Leon Feldhendler, co-organizer of the Sobibor revolt, pictured in 1933

On 22 September, the situation changed dramatically when roughly twenty Jewish Red Army POWs arrived at Sobibor on a transport from the Minsk Ghetto and were selected for labour. Among them was Alexander Pechersky, an actor, songwriter, and political commissar who would go on to lead the revolt. The members of the escape committee approached the newly arrived Russians with excitement, but also caution. On one hand, the Russians were soldiers and thus had the expertise to pull off an escape. But on the other hand, it was not clear whether there was sufficient mutual trust.

Feldhendler introduced himself to Pechersky using the alias "Baruch" and kept an eye on him for his first several days in the camp. In those days, Pechersky distinguished himself by not only standing up to the SS officers, but by showing discretion in how he did so. Feldhendler invited Pechersky to share news from outside the camp at a meeting in the women's barracks. Feldhendler was initially shocked to discover Pechersky's limited ability to speak Yiddish, the common language of Eastern European Jews. However, the two were able to communicate in Russian, and Pechersky agreed to attend. At the meeting, Pechersky gave a speech and took questions while his friend Solomon Leitman translated into Yiddish. (Leitman was a Polish Jew who had befriended Pechersky in the Minsk Ghetto.) Feldhendler and the other members of the escape committee were concerned about Pechersky's blatant communist propaganda, but were nonetheless impressed by him. They were particularly struck by Pechersky's response to a question about whether Soviet partisans would liberate the camp: "No one can do our work for us."

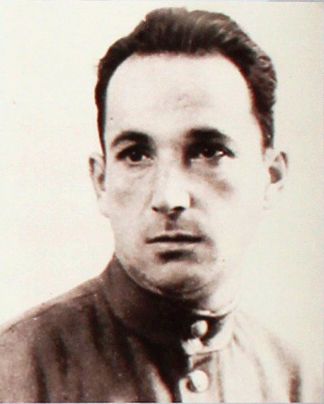
Alexander Pechersky, the principal organizer of the revolt

Over the next few weeks, Pechersky met regularly with the escape committee. These meetings were held in the women's barracks under the pretext of him having an affair with a woman known as "Luka". Pechersky and Feldhendler agreed that the revolt would allow all 600 prisoners at least some chance of escape, though they later concluded that they would not be able to include the over fifty sonderkommando workers who were kept under strict isolation in Lager III. At first, Pechersky and Leitman discussed a plan to dig a tunnel from the carpenter's workshop in Lager I, which was close to the south fence. This idea was abandoned as too difficult. If the tunnel was too deep, it would hit the high water table and flood. Too shallow, and it would detonate one of the mines surrounding the camp. Furthermore, the organizers doubted that they could get all 600 prisoners through the tunnel without getting caught.

The ultimate idea for the revolt came to Pechersky while he was assigned to the forest brigade, chopping wood near Lager III. While working, he heard a child in the gas chamber screaming "Mama! Mama!". Overcome with his feeling of powerlessness and reminded of his own daughter Elsa, he decided that the plan could not be a mere escape. Rather, it would have to be a revolt. Over the next week, Pechersky and Leitman developed what became the ultimate plan.

=== Revolt ===
The revolt began late in the afternoon on 14 October 1943. The plan consisted of two phases. In the first phase, the prisoners would lure the SS officers to secluded locations around the camp and kill them. These covert killings would take place in the hour before evening roll call. The second phase would begin at evening roll call, after all the prisoners had assembled in the Lager I roll call yard. The kapos would announce that the SS had ordered a special work detail in the forest outside the camp, and the entire group would calmly march to freedom out the front gate. If the watchmen found this unusual, they would not be able to confirm their suspicions or coordinate a response since the SS men would be dead.

==== Covert killings ====
At 4:00 pm, Deputy Commandant SS-Untersturmführer Johann Niemann rode up to the Lager I tailor's barracks on his horse. Earlier in the day, the head tailor had scheduled an appointment with him to be fitted for a leather jacket taken from a murdered Jew. The conspirators had prioritized Niemann's execution, since he was acting commandant while Commandant Reichleitner was on leave. Even if the rest of the plan failed, they anticipated that Niemann's death alone would cause enough chaos to allow some chance of escape. While admiring the jacket, Niemann spotted one of the Russian prisoners standing by with an axe. Niemann asked what he was doing there, but was satisfied with the head tailor's explanation that he was simply there to repair a table. At the tailor's request, Niemann removed his pistol holster and put on the jacket. The tailor asked Niemann to turn around, ostensibly to check if any alterations were needed in the back. When Niemann complied, two prisoners crept up behind him with axes and split his head open. Niemann's body was shoved under a table and his blood was covered up with sawdust.

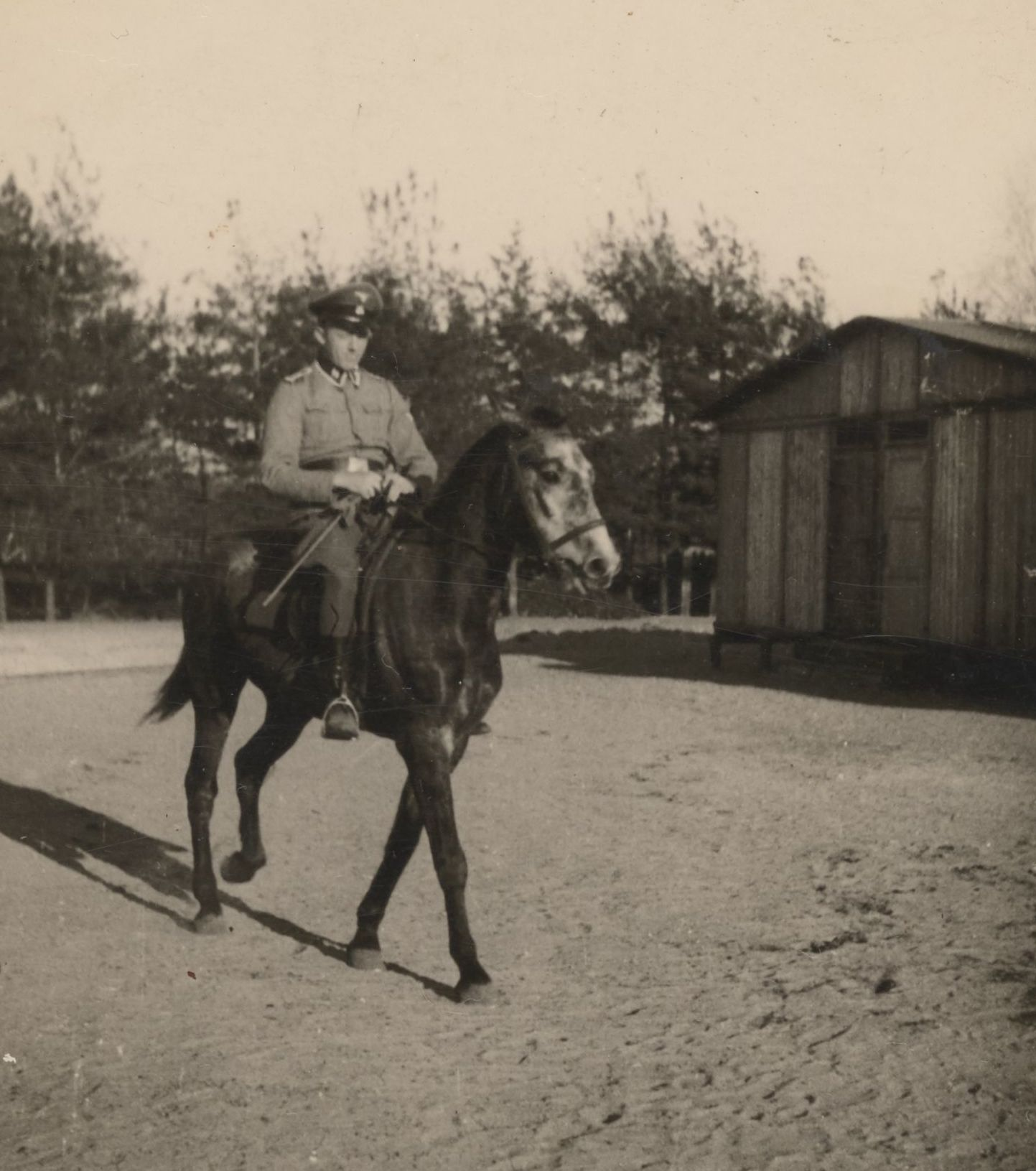
Johann Niemann riding through Lager II several months before he was killed in the revolt

Over the next hour, one SS officer was killed roughly every six minutes. Other than Niemann, those killed in Lager I included SS-Unterscharführer Josef Vallaster, SS-Oberscharführer Siegfried Graetschus, Sturmführer Ivan Klatt, SS-Unterscharführer Friedrich Gaulstich, and SS-Unterscharführer Fritz Konrad. Those killed in Lager II included SS-Scharführer Josef Wolf and SS-Oberscharführer Rudolf Beckmann. Unterscharführer Walter Ryba was killed in the Vorlager. Other officers killed include Max Bree, Anton Nowak, Thomas Steffl, Ernst Stengelin. The details of many of these killings are unknown.

The conspirators had originally planned to kill SS-Oberscharführer Rudolf Beckmann in a Lager II storage barracks, but on his way to the appointment, Beckmann had suddenly turned around and headed back to the administration building. Chaim Engel volunteered to kill Beckmann in his office, after overhearing Feldhendler discussing the situation with Kapo Hersh Pozyczki, the younger brother of Oberkapo Pozyczki. Engel and the younger Pozyczki went together to the administration building, and Engel stabbed Beckmann while Pozyczki restrained him. When Engel stabbed Beckmann, he shouted "For my father! For my brother! For all the Jews!" Beckmann struggled as Engel stabbed him, causing Engel's knife to slip and cut his own hand. Once Beckmann was dead, the two prisoners pushed his body under the desk, not having time to better hide him or clean up.

While the killings proceeded, Szlomo Szmajzner went to the Vorlager to acquire additional guns from the watchmens' barracks. During the last organizational meeting, on 12 October, he had offered to do so himself. As the camp machinist, Smajzner was often called to the Vorlager to clean and repair the stoves there, so he was able to enter the barracks carrying a replacement stovepipe over his shoulder. He entered the watchmens' barracks and helped himself to six rifles and ammunition. However, he could only fit two of the rifles inside the stovepipe, so he wrapped the others in a blanket. Once he was ready to go, he decided that it might be safer to hunker down in the Vorlager and not return to Lager I until the bugle call. That way, it would seem like he had been acting alone if he was caught. Just before the bugle at 5:00 pm, he found two child prisoners and ordered them to carry the blanket with the rifles. They were scared, so he forced them to do it at knifepoint. After the bugle call, he delivered the rifles to the Russians, but demanded that they let him keep one for himself.

==== Breakout ====
As roll call drew closer, Pechersky became increasingly concerned that the revolt would soon be discovered. He was surprised that the plan had succeeded so far, but nonetheless several killings had not gone as intended. In particular, while his plan had required that the SS men be killed discreetly, an impulsive prisoner had killed Unterscharführer Walter Ryba in the outdoor Vorlager garage. Pechersky considered beginning the breakout early, but was reluctant to do so while SS-Oberscharführer Karl Frenzel was still alive. Frenzel, regarded as one of the most dangerous officers in the camp, had dallied in the shower and was late for his appointment in the carpenter's shop. Close to 5:00 pm, Pechersky and Leitman finally decided to give up on Frenzel and sent the bugler Judah to climb the forester's tower and blow the bugle announcing the end of the workday.

At this point, many prisoners in Lager I had already left their jobs and were standing around in the roll call yard or hiding in the adjacent buildings. In Lager II, the prisoners were confused by the early bugle call and gathered haphazardly for the march back to Lager I. Feldhendler was concerned that their unusual and disorderly lineup would attract attention from the guards, so he decided to lead the march on his own. He lined them up and they marched, singing the German sentimental tune "Es war ein Edelweiss". As the prisoners gathered in the roll call yard, rumours about the revolt began to spread among them. When a watchman prodded them to line up faster, a group of prisoners shouted "don't you know the war is over" and killed him out in the open, to the shock of many others. Realizing that the yard had become a powder keg, Pechersky attempted to inform the group of what was going on. Blatt recalled Pechersky's speech as follows:

Our day has come. Most of the Germans are dead. Let's die with honor. Remember, if anyone survives, he must tell the world what has happened here!

As the prisoners began to disperse, they heard shots from Lager II. These shots were fired by SS-Oberscharführer Erich Bauer, who had returned from Chełm with a truck full of vodka. Just before the bugle sounded, Bauer had ordered two child prisoners to unload the vodka and carry it into the storeroom in the administration building where Beckmann had been killed. At approximately the moment when Pechersky was making his speech in Lager I, a watchman ran over to Bauer shouting "Ein deutsch kaput!" Thinking that the children were responsible, Bauer fired his pistol, killing one of the children but missing the other. When the prisoners in Lager I heard these shots, they ran in every direction. A group of them dragged a watchman off his bicycle and killed him. Many prisoners had to make a split-second decision without knowing exactly what was going on. The plan had been kept on a need-to-know basis, so even those who were aware of the revolt knew few details. Pechersky and Feldhendler ran around the yard trying to shepherd prisoners out, but around 175 nonetheless stayed back.

As the crowd surged forward, there was a moment of confusion in which the watchmen in the towers did not react. Itzhak Lichtman reported seeing some of the remaining SS men hiding, perhaps thinking that the camp was being attacked by partisans. After a moment, the watchmen began shooting into the crowd, and some of the prisoners shot with the rifles procured by Szmajzner and with pistols taken from dead SS officers. Szmajzner hit a watchman in a tower, later recalling "I did not do that; God did."

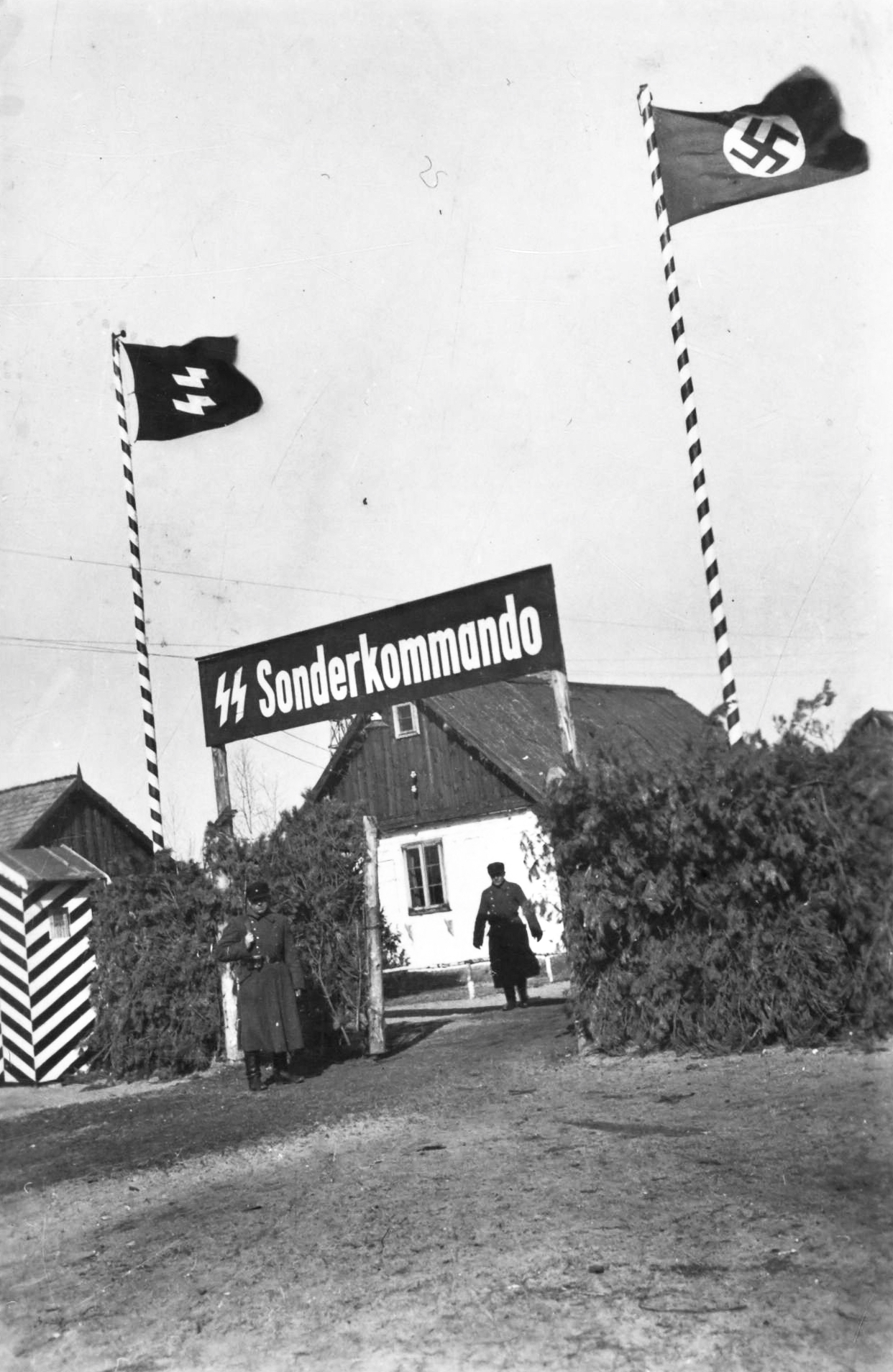
The main gate as it appeared in March 1943. The fence was thatched with pine branches in order to block the view inside.

One group of prisoners ran behind the carpenter's shop. The carpenters had left ladders, pliers, and axes lying in the weeds next to the south fence, as a backup plan in case the main gate in the Vorlager proved inaccessible. These prisoners scaled the fence, traversed the ditch, and began running through the minefield towards the forest. As they ran, the mines exploded, killing some of the escapees and attracting the attention of the watchmen in the towers who began shooting. Esther Raab felt a bullet graze her head above her right ear. She kept running, but felt herself losing strength. She reached out to hold onto a woman running next to her, but the woman pushed her off and shouted "leave me alone!"

A larger group of prisoners headed for the Vorlager. These prisoners tried to escape through the main gate or over the south fence, while a group of Soviet prisoners attempted to raid the armoury. There, they were met with Frenzel, who at this point had gotten out of the shower and was getting himself a pre-roll-call drink in the canteen. Attracted by the commotion, Frenzel had grabbed a machine gun and run outside. Seeing the crowd of prisoners heading to the main gate, he opened fire, spraying the crowd of prisoners. Pechersky fired at Frenzel using Vallaster's pistol but missed. A group of prisoners attempted to rush the main gate, but were met with another SS officer there shooting into the crowd. Some scattered, but others were pushed forward by the force of those behind them. They trampled the main gate and flooded out.

Others in the Vorlager tried to escape over the barbed wire behind the SS officers' barracks, correctly guessing that there would be fewer mines there. Many prisoners who attempted to get out this way got stuck on the barbed wire. Among these prisoners was Thomas Blatt, who survived because the fence collapsed on top of him. As he lay on the ground, he saw the prisoners in front of him blown up as they crossed the minefield. Blatt freed himself by slipping out of his coat which was stuck on the barbed wire and running across the exploded mines and into the forest.

Roughly 300 prisoners escaped to the forest.

=== Aftermath ===
Immediately after the escape, in the forest, a group of fifty prisoners followed Pechersky. After a few days, Pechersky and seven other Russian POWs left, claiming that they would return with food. However, they instead left to cross the Bug River and make contact with the partisans. After Pechersky did not return, the remaining prisoners split into smaller groups and sought separate ways.

In 1980, Blatt asked Pechersky why he abandoned the other survivors. Pechersky answered,

My job was done. You were Polish Jews in your own terrain. I belonged in the Soviet Union and still considered myself a soldier. In my opinion, the chances for survival were better in smaller units. To tell the people straight forward: "we must part" would not have worked. You have seen, they followed every step of mine, we all would perish. [...] what can I say? You were there. We were only people. The basic instincts came into play. It was still a fight for survival. This is the first time I hear about money collection. It was a turmoil, it was difficult to control everything. I admit, I have seen the imbalance in the distribution of the weaponry but you must understand, they would rather die than to give up their arms.— Pechersky

Dutch historian and Sobibor survivor Jules Schelvis estimates that 158 inmates perished in the Sobibor revolt, killed by the guards or in the minefield surrounding the camp. A further 107 were killed either by the SS, Wehrmacht soldiers sent by Siegfried Haenicke, or Orpo police units pursuing them. Some 53 insurgents died of other causes between the day of the revolt and 8 May 1945. There were 58 known survivors, 48 male and 10 female, from among the Arbeitshäftlinge prisoners performing slave-labour for the daily operation of Sobibor. Their time in the camp ranged from several weeks to almost two years.

=== Liquidation and demolition ===
Once the shooting stopped, the surviving SS secured the camp. They held the remaining prisoners in Lager I at gunpoint and executed those found hiding in other areas of the camp. They searched for Niemann, who had been left in charge of the camp while Commandant Reichleitner was on holiday. After the sun set, the search continued in the dark, since the prisoners had cut the powerlines.

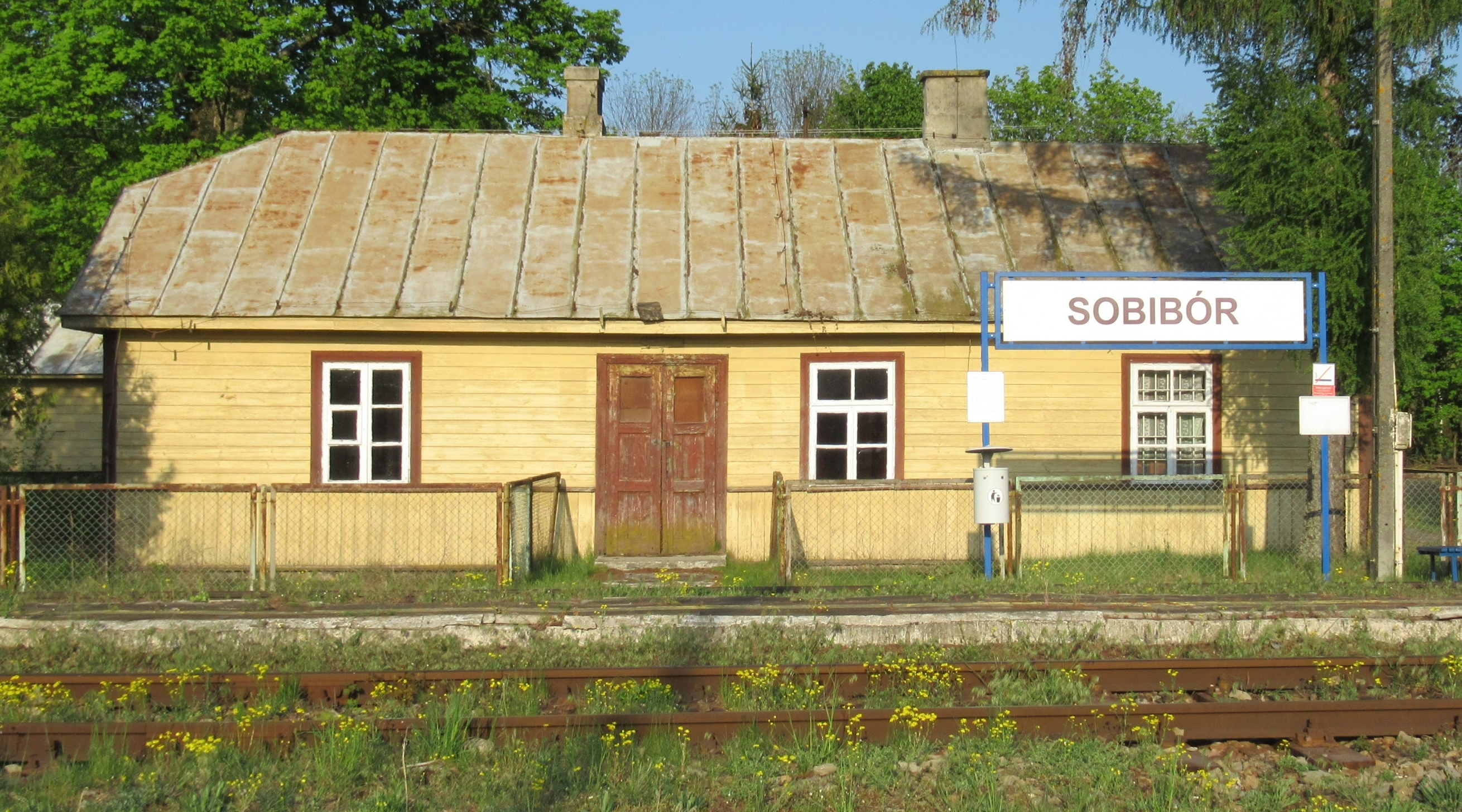
Sobibór train station, where Frenzel called for backup after the revolt

Around 8:00 pm, Niemann's corpse was found in the tailor's barracks and Frenzel assumed command. His first undertaking was to summon reinforcements, thinking that the remaining prisoners would resist and worried that the escapees might launch a second attack. After discovering that the prisoners had cut the phone lines, he went to use the phone at the Sobibór train station, located a few metres outside the camp. He called multiple SS outposts in Lublin and Chełm, as well as a nearby battalion of Wehrmacht soldiers. Reinforcements were delayed by bureaucratic confusion as well as the railway lines having been blown up by partisans. However, a group of SS officials arrived later that night, including Gottlieb Hering and Christian Wirth. Wirth ordered Erich Bauer to go to summon the Sicherheitspolizei from Chełm in person, since Frenzel had been unable to reach them by phone. Bauer balked, afraid that he would be attacked on the way.

During the night, the SS combed the camp for hiding prisoners. Many were armed and fought back. Jakub Biskubicz, the putzer who Bauer had shot at during the revolt, witnessed this part of the search before escaping:

Until midnight I lay on the earth. I could hear shouts and screams from all directions. At midnight, I heard shooting close to me and the voices of Germans say: "Nobody is here." They left... I reached [Lager] IV. I saw the open door of a watchtower. Nobody was around. I climbed the ladder of the tower and jumped outside over the fences and mines. I fell on the railway and escaped to the forest.

Early the next day, 15 October, the Sobibor SS were joined by numerous SS including Hermann Höfle, as well as eighty Wehrmacht soldiers. They marched the remaining 159 prisoners to Lager III and shot them. The Nazis launched a manhunt, worried that the advancing Red Army would find the Polish countryside scattered with witnesses to their crimes. SS officers, Wehrmacht soldiers, and Luftwaffe airplanes swept the surrounding area, while locals were offered bounties for assisting. Several SS officers involved in the manhunt were put up for medals for their "incisive action".

Surviving German documents show that 59 escapees were caught in the nearby villages of Sobibór and Różanka on 17 and 18 October. The Germans recovered weapons from them, including a hand grenade. A few days later, on 21 October, another five Jews were killed by Wehrmacht soldiers near Adampol and an additional eight in Sawin. In all, records indicate that at least 107 escapees were killed specifically by the Germans, while another 23 are known to have been killed by non-Germans. Jules Schelvis estimates that roughly 30 died in other ways before the end of the war.

On 19 October, SS chief Himmler ordered that the camp be closed. Jewish slave labourers were sent to Sobibor from Treblinka in order to dismantle the camp. They demolished the gas chambers and most of the camp buildings, but left behind several barracks for future use by Baudienst. The work was finished by the end of the October, and all of the Jews brought from Treblinka were shot between 1 November and 10 November.

== Aftermath ==
=== Survivors ===
Several thousand deportees to Sobibor were spared the gas chambers because they were transferred to slave-labour camps in the Lublin reservation, upon arriving at Sobibor. These people spent several hours at Sobibor and were transferred almost immediately to slave-labour projects including Majdanek and the Lublin airfield camp, where materials looted from the gassed victims were prepared for shipment to Germany. Other forced labour camps included Krychów, Dorohucza, and Trawniki. Most of these prisoners were murdered in the November 1943 massacre Operation Harvest Festival, or perished in other ways before the end of the war. Of the 34,313 Jews deported to Sobibor from the Netherlands according to train schedules, 18 are known to have survived the war. In June 2019 the last known survivor of the revolt, Simjon Rosenfeld, who was born in what is now Belarus, died at a retirement home near Tel Aviv, Israel, aged 96.

=== Trials ===
Most perpetrators of Operation Reinhard were never brought to trial. However, there were several Sobibor trials after the war. SS-Oberscharführer Erich Bauer was the first SS officer from Sobibor to be tried. Bauer was arrested in 1946 when two former Jewish prisoners from Sobibor, Samuel Lerer and Esther Terner, recognized him at a fairground in the Kreuzberg neighborhood of Berlin. On 8 May 1950, Bauer was sentenced to death for crimes against humanity, though his sentence was commuted to life imprisonment due to West Germany's abolition of capital punishment. Terner testified against Bauer, and later recalled thinking "This nothing had such power?" The second Sobibor trials occurred shortly after, against Hubert Gomerski and Johann Klier. Gomerski was given a life sentence while Johann Klier was acquitted, in part due to favorable testimony from Terner.

The third Sobibor trials were the Hagen Trials, which took place in West Germany. The twelve defendants included Karl Frenzel and Kurt Bolender. Frenzel was sentenced to life imprisonment for personally killing 6 Jews and participating in the mass murder of an additional 150,000. Bolender committed suicide before sentencing. Five other defendants were given sentences of less than eight years, and the rest were acquitted.

In the 1970s and 1980s, several SS men were retried. Gomerski was ultimately freed on procedural grounds since he was deemed too ill to participate in the proceedings. Subsequently, Frenzel's life sentence was upheld after a retrial in which Gomerski testified.

In the Soviet Union, there were several rounds of trials against Soviet citizens who had served at Sobibor as watchmen. In April 1963, a court in Kiev convicted eleven former watchmen, sentencing ten to death and one to 15 years in prison. In June 1965, three more watchmen from Sobibor were convicted in Kiev and executed. Another six were put to death in Krasnodar.

In May 2011, John Demjanjuk was convicted for being an accessory to the murder of 28,060 Jews while serving as a watchman at Sobibor. He was sentenced to five years in prison, but was released pending appeal. He died in a German nursing home on 17 March 2012, aged 91, while awaiting the hearing.

=== The site ===
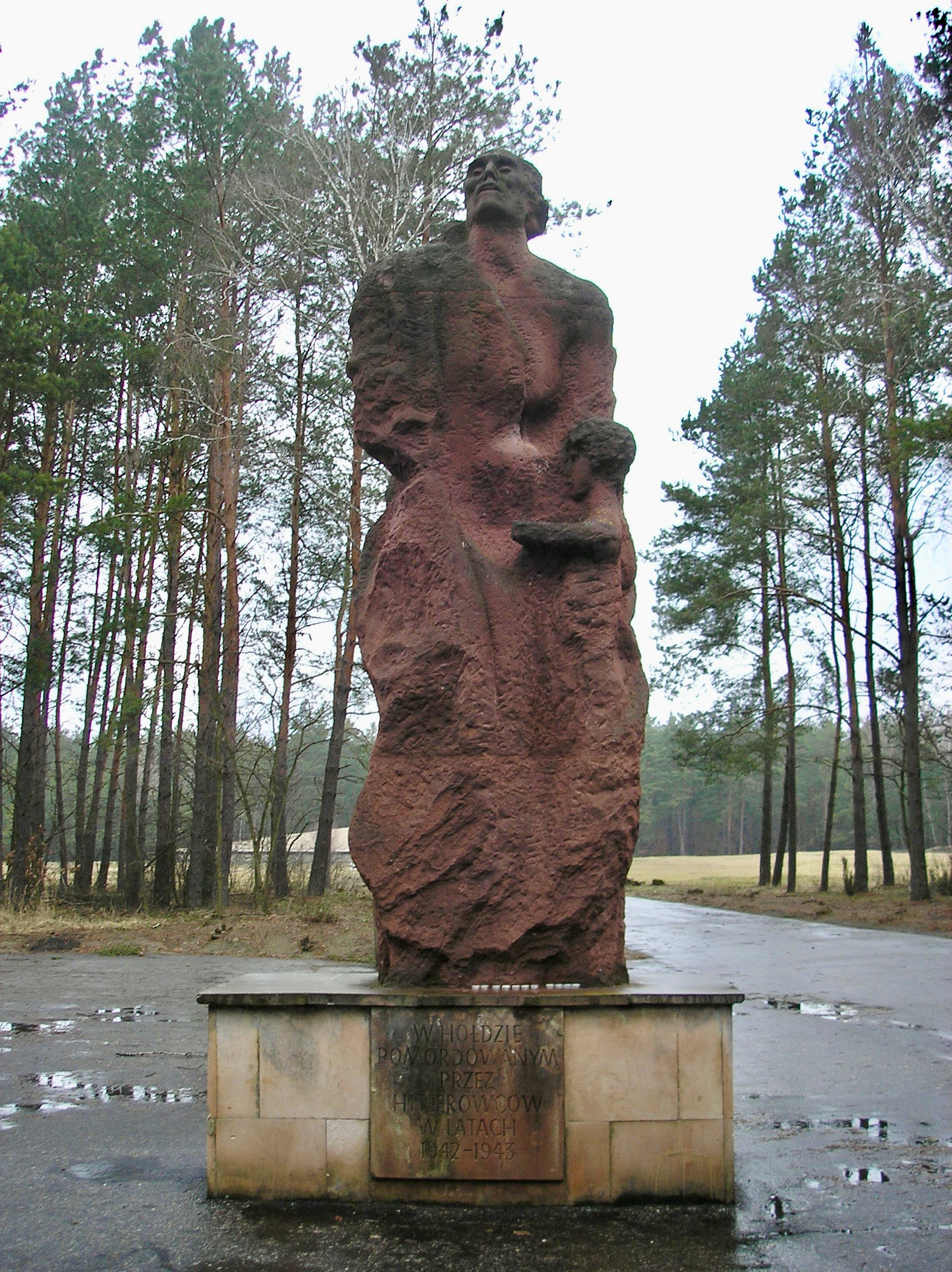
Statue of a mother and her child by Mieczysław Welter, near the former site of the gas chambers

The Germans were driven out of the area in July 1944. In August, Lieutenant Colonel Semion Volsky of the Red Army photographed the site and prepared a report which is on file in the Central Archives of the Russian Ministry of Defence. After the end of the German occupation, the camp's remaining barracks were briefly used to house Ukrainian civilians waiting to be resettled. These deportees dismantled several remaining buildings for use as firewood. Parts of the Vorlager were subsequently sold to private individuals, though most of the camp site was returned to the Polish forestry administration.

A September 1945 report by Polish authorities noted that locals had dismantled most of the remaining camp buildings, reusing parts of them in their own houses. This report was corroborated in 2010 when a resident of nearby Żłobek Duży discovered unusual woodwork during a renovation project. Knowing that the previous owner of the house had worked near the camp, they alerted researchers from the Sobibor Museum who concluded that the woodwork was taken from the exterior of a camp barracks. The site was also a target for grave-diggers, who scoured the site for valuables left by the camp's victims. When the Chief Commission for the Prosecution of Crimes against the Polish Nation studied the site in 1945, they found trenches dug by treasure-seekers, who had left the surface strewn with ashes and human remains. Grave-digging continued in the area, despite several prosecutions in the 1960s.

In the first twenty years after the war, the site of the camp was practically deserted. A journalist visiting the site in the early 1950s reported "there is nothing left in Sobibor". When Gitta Sereny visited the site in March 1972, she initially drove past it without realizing. She later commented that she was struck by "the quiet, the loneliness, above all the vastness of the place, which left everything to the imagination"

The first monuments to Sobibor victims were erected on the site in 1965. Installed by the Council for the Protection of Struggle and Martyrdom Sites, these consisted of a memorial wall, an obelisk symbolizing the gas chambers, a sculpture of a mother and her child, and a mausoleum called the "Memory Mound". The memorial wall originally listed Jews as just one of the groups persecuted at Sobibor, but the plaque was revised in 1993 to reflect the general historical consensus that all or nearly all victims of Sobibor were Jews.

In 1993, the Włodawa Museum took over the memorial from the forestry administration. They established the Sobibór Museum which opened on 14 October 1993, the 50th anniversary of the revolt. The museum was housed in a post-war building within the former site of Lager II, which had previously served as a kindergarten. In 2012, the memorial changed hands once again, this time falling under the control of the Majdanek State Museum, who held a design competition sponsored by the governments of Poland, Israel, the Netherlands and Slovakia.

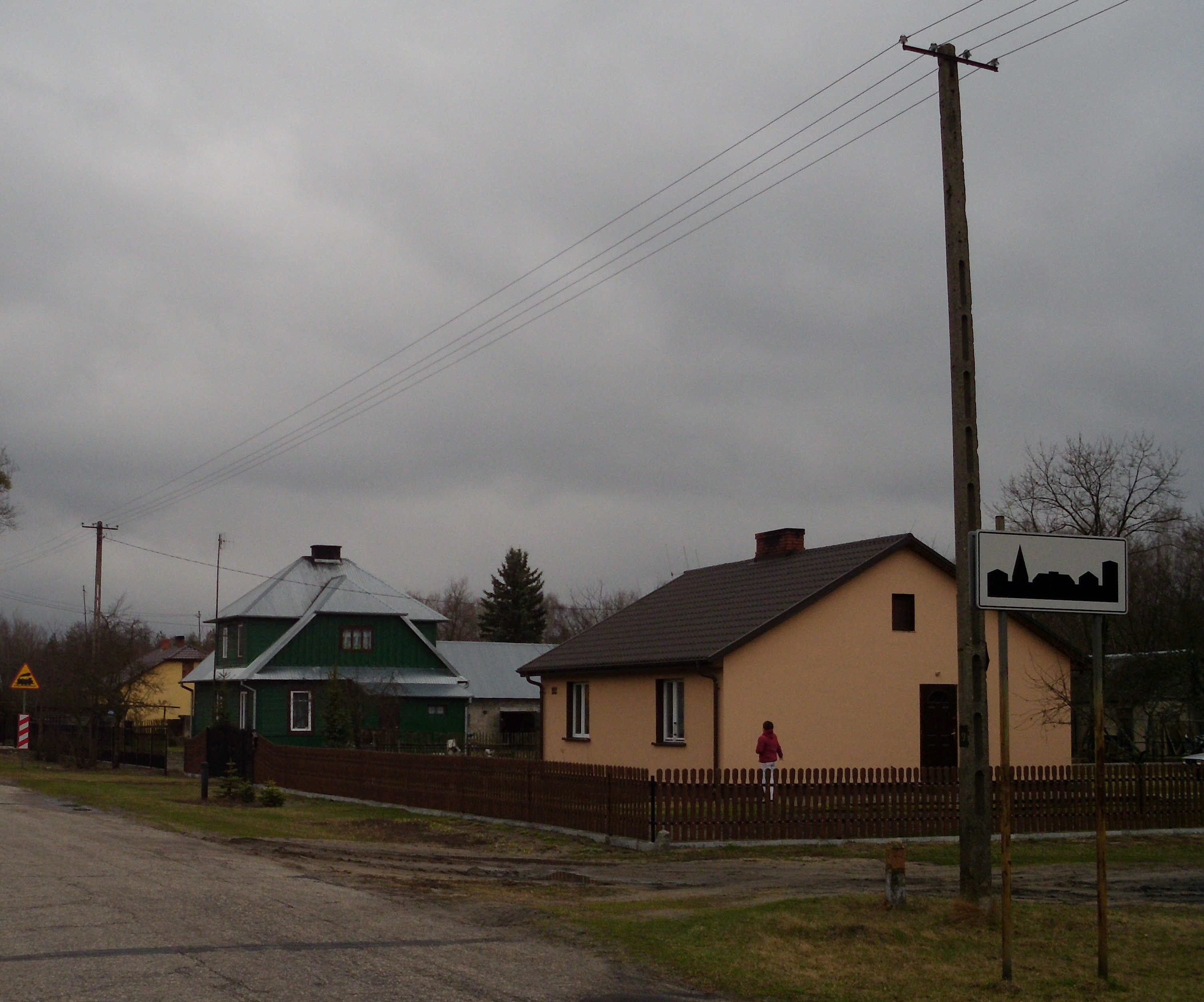
The site of the Vorlager, pictured in 2012. The green house is the only remaining building that was part of the camp. Today, it is a private residence.

In 2018, the mass graves in the former area of Lager III were covered with white stones, and construction began on a new museum building. However, most of the area of the site is still either privately owned or under the control of the forestry administration, and the camp's arrival ramp was used for loading lumber as recently as 2015. Since the forestry tower was demolished in 2004 (after decaying nearly to the point of collapse), the only remaining building from the camp is the green post office. This building is privately owned.

=== Research ===
In the immediate aftermath of the war, several investigations were carried out. Starting in 1945, the Chief Commission for the Prosecution of Crimes against the Polish Nation and Central Committee of Polish Jews investigated Sobibor, interviewing witnesses and surveying the site. In 1946, Nachman Blumental published a study entitled "The Death Camp – Sobibór" in 1946, which drew on work by the other investigations, and information about Sobibor was gathered for The Black Book of Polish Jewry.

Until the 1990s, little was known about the physical site of the camp beyond what survivors and perpetrators could recall. Archaeological investigations at Sobibor began in the 1990s. In 2001, a team led by Andrzej Kola from Nicolaus Copernicus University in Toruń investigated the former area of Lager III, finding seven pits with a total volume of roughly 19,000 cubic meters. While some of these pits appear to have been mass graves, others may have been used for open air cremation. The team also found pieces of barbed wire embedded in trees, which they identified as remnants of the camp's perimeter fence. Thus, they were able to partially map out the perimeter of the former camp site, which had not previously been known.

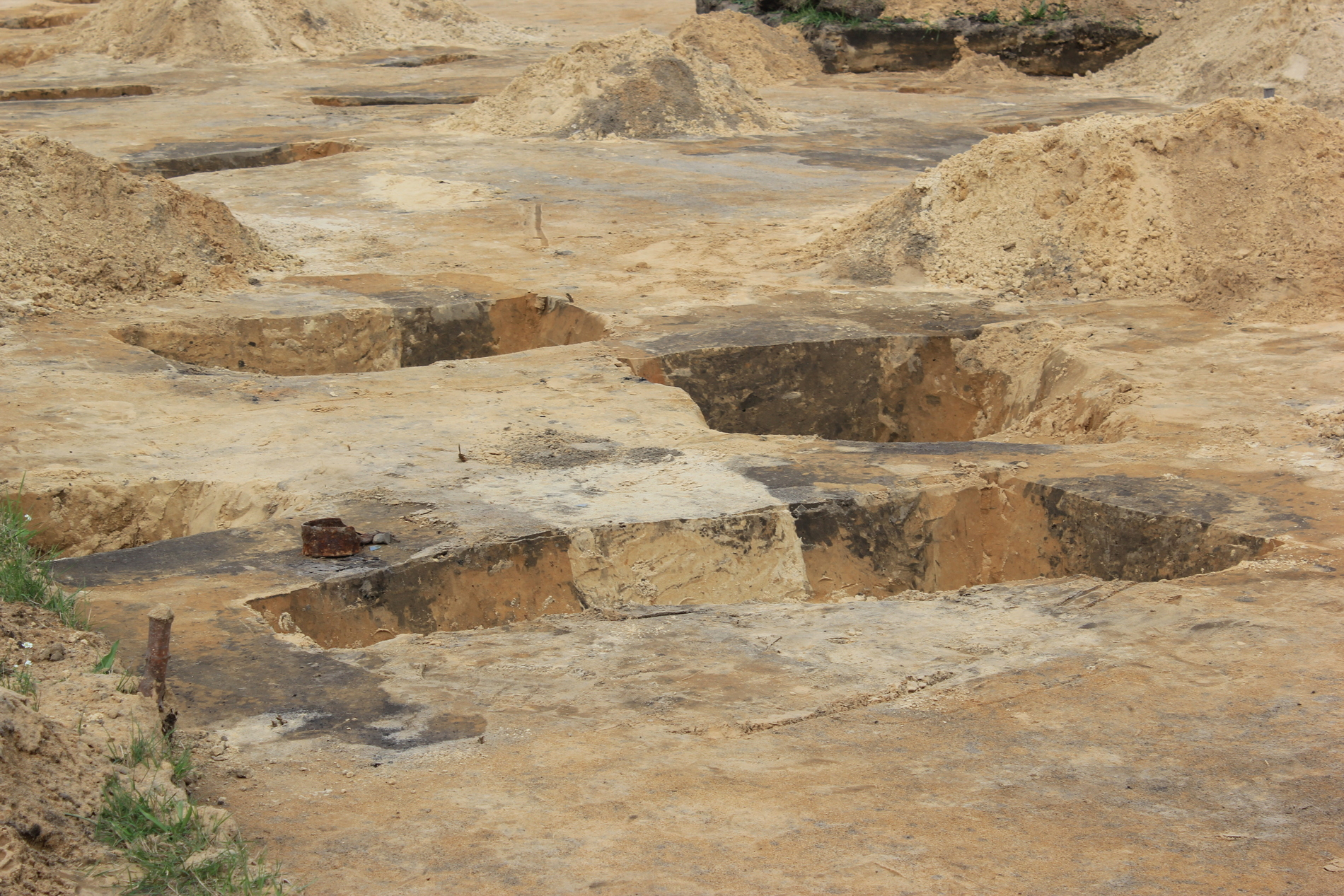
Archaeological excavations in the former area of the camp, pictured in 2014

In 2007, two archaeologists named Wojciech Mazurek and Yoram Haimi began to conduct small-scale investigations. Since 2013, the camp has been excavated by a joint team of Polish, Israeli, Slovak, and Dutch archeologists led by Mazurek, Haimi, and Ivar Schute. In accordance with Jewish law, these excavations avoided mass graves and were supervised by Polish rabbis. Their discovery of the foundations of the gas chambers, in 2014, attracted worldwide media attention. Between 2011 and 2015, thousands of personal items belonging to victims were uncovered by the teams. At the ramp, large dumps of household items, including "glasses, combs, cutlery, plates, watches, coins, razors, thimbles, scissors, toothpaste" were found, but few valuables; Schute suggests that these items are indicative of victims' hopes to survive as forced labourers. In Lager III, the extermination area, household items were not found but "gold fillings, dentures, pendants, earrings, and a gold ring" were. Schute notes that such objects could have been concealed by naked individuals, and argues that it is evidence for the "processing" of bodies at this location.

In 2020, the United States Holocaust Memorial Museum acquired a collection of photographs and documents from the descendants of Johann Niemann. These photos show daily life amongst the camp staff. Many show the perpetrators drinking, playing music, and playing chess with one another. These photos are significant because there had previously only been two known photographs of Sobibor during its operation. These materials have been published in a German language book and ebook by Metropol Verlag entitled Fotos aus Sobibor. The photos received voluminous press coverage because two of them appear to show John Demjanjuk in the camp.

=== Dramatisations ===
The mechanics of Sobibor death camp were the subject of interviews filmed on location for the 1985 documentary film Shoah by Claude Lanzmann. In 2001, Lanzmann combined unused interviews with survivor Yehuda Lerner shot during the making of Shoah, along with new footage of Lerner, to tell the story of the revolt and escape in his followup documentary Sobibor, October 14, 1943, 4 p.m.

A highly fictionalized version of the Sobibor revolt was depicted in the 1978 American TV miniseries Holocaust.

The revolt was dramatized in the 1987 British TV film Escape from Sobibor, directed by Jack Gold and adapted from the book by Richard Rashke. The film's consultants included survivors Thomas Blatt, Shlomo Szmajzner, and Esther Raab.

More recently, the revolt was depicted in the 2018 Russian movie Sobibor, directed by Konstantin Khabensky. The movie presents Sasha Pechersky as a Russian patriotic figure, a depiction criticized by Garry Kasparov among others.
