= Sobibór Museum =

Polish WWII death camp museum

- Muzeum Byłego Hitlerowskiego Obozu Zagłady w Sobiborze
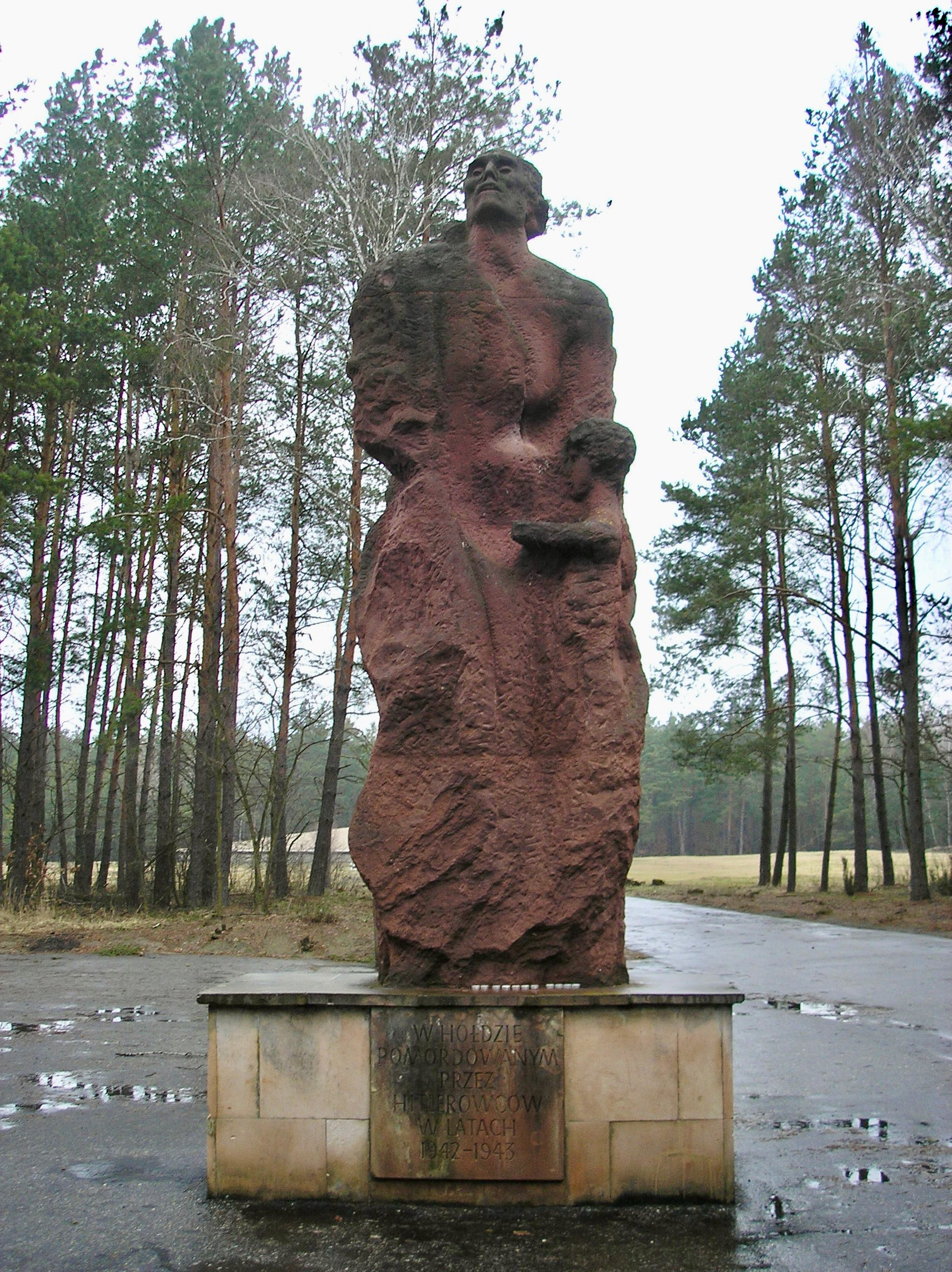
- Sobibór Museum monument, Woman and child martyrology, iron
- Established: 1993
- Location: Sobibór, Poland
- Coordinates: 51.4459°N 23.5964°E
- Director: Dr Krzysztof Skwirowski
- Website: www.sobibor-memorial.eu

The Sobibór Museum or the Museum of the Former Sobibór Nazi Death Camp (Polish: Muzeum Byłego Hitlerowskiego Obozu Zagłady w Sobiborze), is a Polish state-owned museum devoted to remembering the atrocities committed at the former Sobibor extermination camp located on the outskirts of Sobibór near Lublin. The Nazi German death camp was set up in occupied Poland during World War II, as part of the Jewish extermination program known as the Operation Reinhard, which marked the most deadly phase of the Holocaust in Poland. The camp was run by the SS Sonderkommando Sobibor headed by Franz Stangl. The number of Jews from Poland and elsewhere who were gassed and cremated there between April 1942 and 14 October 1943 is estimated at 250,000; possibly more, including those who came from other Reich-occupied countries.

Since 1 May 2012 the Sobibór Museum has been a branch of the Majdanek State Museum, dedicated to the history and commemoration of the Holocaust camps and subcamps of KL Lublin. Originally, the museum served as an out-of-town division of the district museum in Włodawa nearby founded in 1981. The Ministry of Culture and National Heritage reopened the Museum with additional funding after its administrative reorganisation.

== Museum history ==
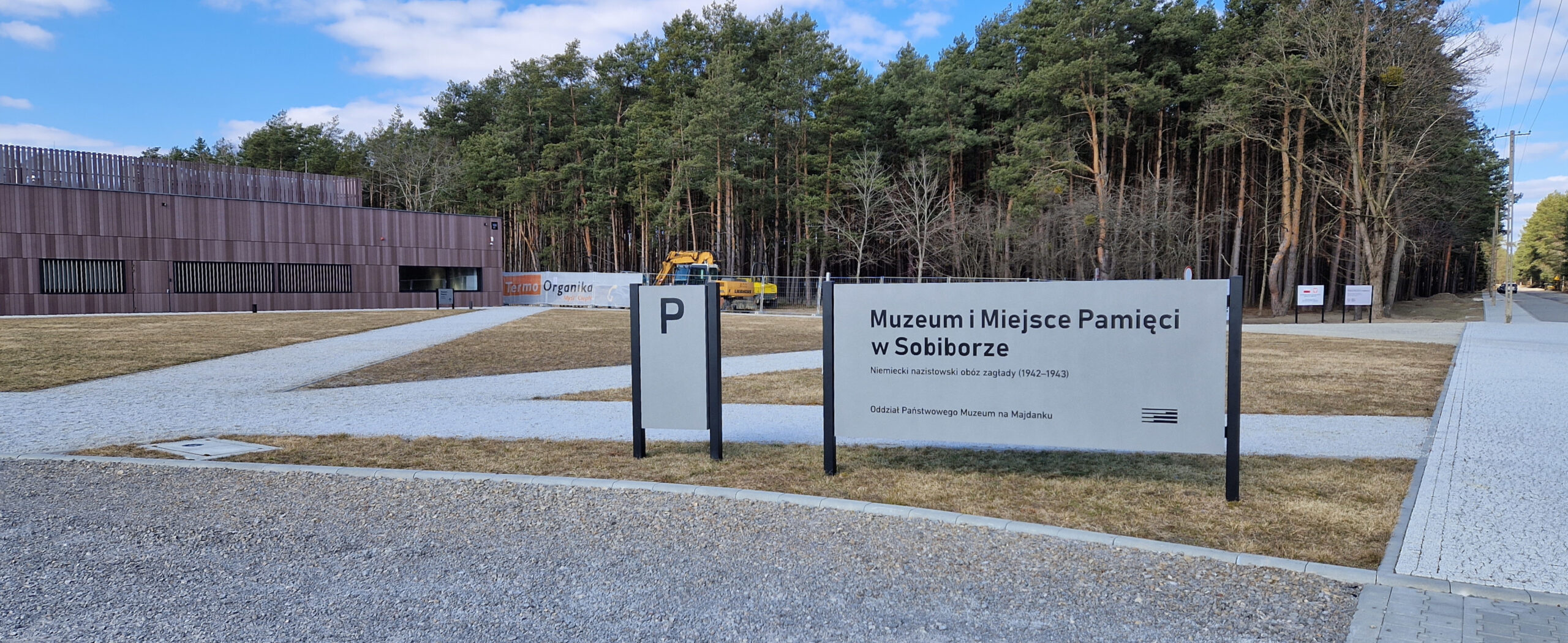
Visitor center

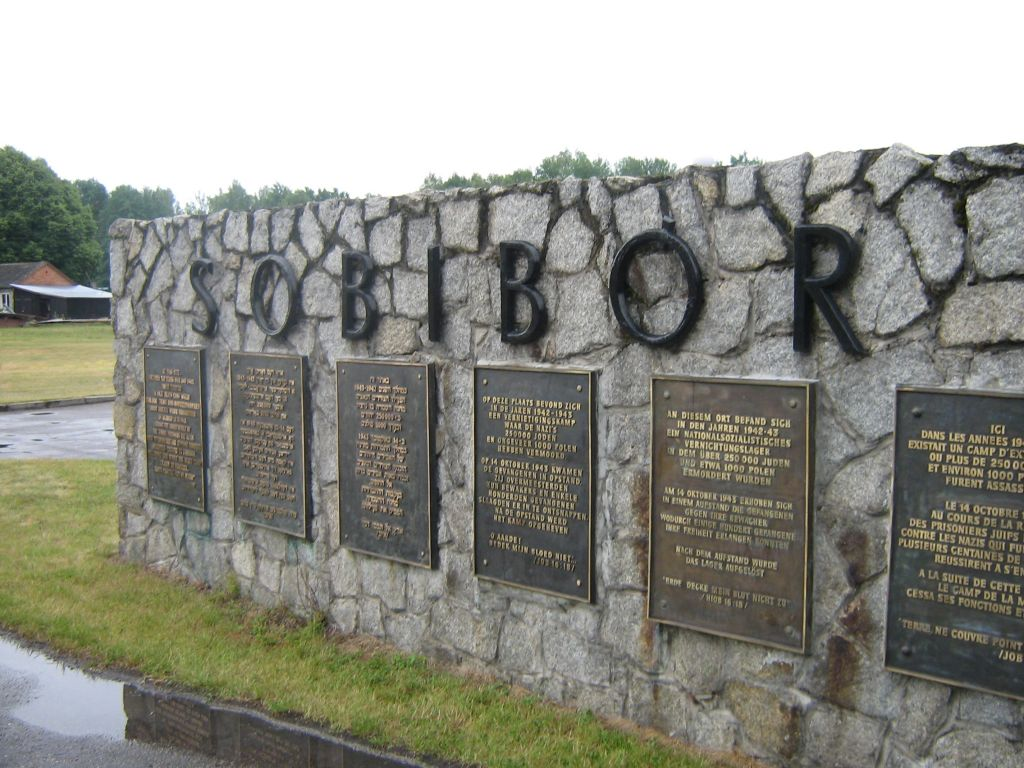
Sobibór trail of memory

Little was known about the camp before the Sobibor trial in Hagen, Germany, and the parallel trials of the Trawniki men in Krasnodar and Kyiv in the former USSR, inspired by the investigative work of Simon Wiesenthal and the highly publicized snatching of Eichmann by Mossad. Most Holocaust survivors had left Poland long before these events, and the camp was largely forgotten.

The first monument to Sobibór victims was erected on the historic site in 1965. The Włodawa Museum, which was responsible for the monument, established a separate Sobibór branch on 14 October 1993, the 50th anniversary of the armed uprising of Jewish prisoners there, some of whom successfully escaped in 1943 (see Escape from Sobibor, which aired on CBS in 1987), thus prompting the camp's premature closure.

== Research and conservation programs ==
The Museum complex comprises the museum building located near the former railway station, which are connected by a paved Trail of Memory; a cast-iron statue of a woman with child on the "Road to Heaven" (Himmelfahrtstrasse) sculpted by Mieczysław Welter, as well as a large circular enclosure with a mound of ashes and crushed bones of the victims, collected at the site and formed into a broad pyramid next to the original open-air cremation pits; and local archive of the facsimiles of testimonies and pertinent documents.

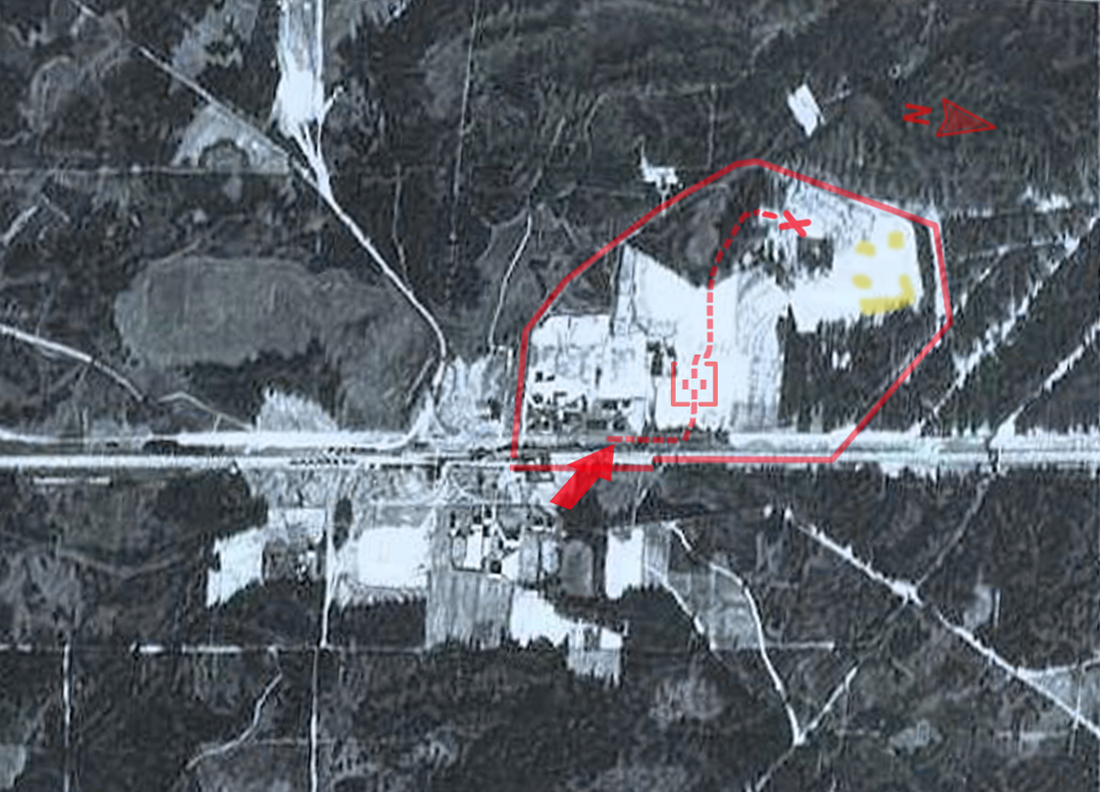
Aerial photograph of the Sobibór death factory possibly just ahead of formation. Permanent structures are not there yet, including Camp II barracks (lower centre), as well as Camp III, and Camp IV. The railway unloading platform (with visible prewar train station) marked with the red arrow, location of gas chambers marked with a cross. Undressing area marked with red square with adjacent "Road to Heaven" through the forest

The camp is scheduled to undergo more advanced geophysical studies and further archaeological excavations. In the camp perimeter, there are practically no fixed objects of any kind since the SS meticulously removed as much evidence as possible. Any research work around and near the graves is conducted under the strict supervision of the Chief Rabbi of Poland, Michael Schudrich.

The first excavation project was completed in October 2007. Over one thousand items belonging to the victims were unearthed. In October 2009, the second excavation phase was conducted, which determined the exact placement of double-row barbed-wire fencing posts around the camp. The work revealed numerous new artifacts as well, including false teeth, keepsakes from Marienbad, and many suitcase keys. In the autumn of 2012 the north-western section around mass graves 1 and 2 was analyzed, including geophysical evidence of the barbed-wire enclosure that separated mass graves and cremation pits from the living area of Camp III, and the perimeter of the killing zone as well.

In May 2013 the Israeli and Polish archaeologists conducting excavations near Camp III, unearthed an escape tunnel 10 metres (33 ft) long and 1.6–2 m deep in some places, beginning under the barracks of the Jewish Sonderkommando and leading toward a double-row barbed-wire fence. The tunnel may have collapsed with people inside; the camp perimeter is known to have been mined. Notably, the camp records do not mention any incident of this kind. Other new findings included children identification tags from the Netherlands, and seven human skeletal remains possibly those of the Jewish work-detail shot upon the completion of the removal of genocide evidence.

== External sources ==
- Media related to Sobibór extermination camp at Wikimedia Commons
- "Sobibor. Ministerstwo zbuduje muzeum", at the RP.pl webpage. (in Polish) Retrieved June 8, 2013.
- "Sobibór bez zwiedzających", at the RP.pl webpage. (in Polish) Retrieved June 8, 2013.
- "The Museum of the Former Nazi Death Camp in Sobibór has been closed," at Sztetl.org webpage. Retrieved June 8, 2013.
- The museum faced with closure on April 30, 2011, at the Fight Hatred.com webpage. Retrieved June 8, 2013.
- "How to get there", at Polish Forums.com webpage. Retrieved June 8, 2013.
