= Sobibór (village) =

- Village
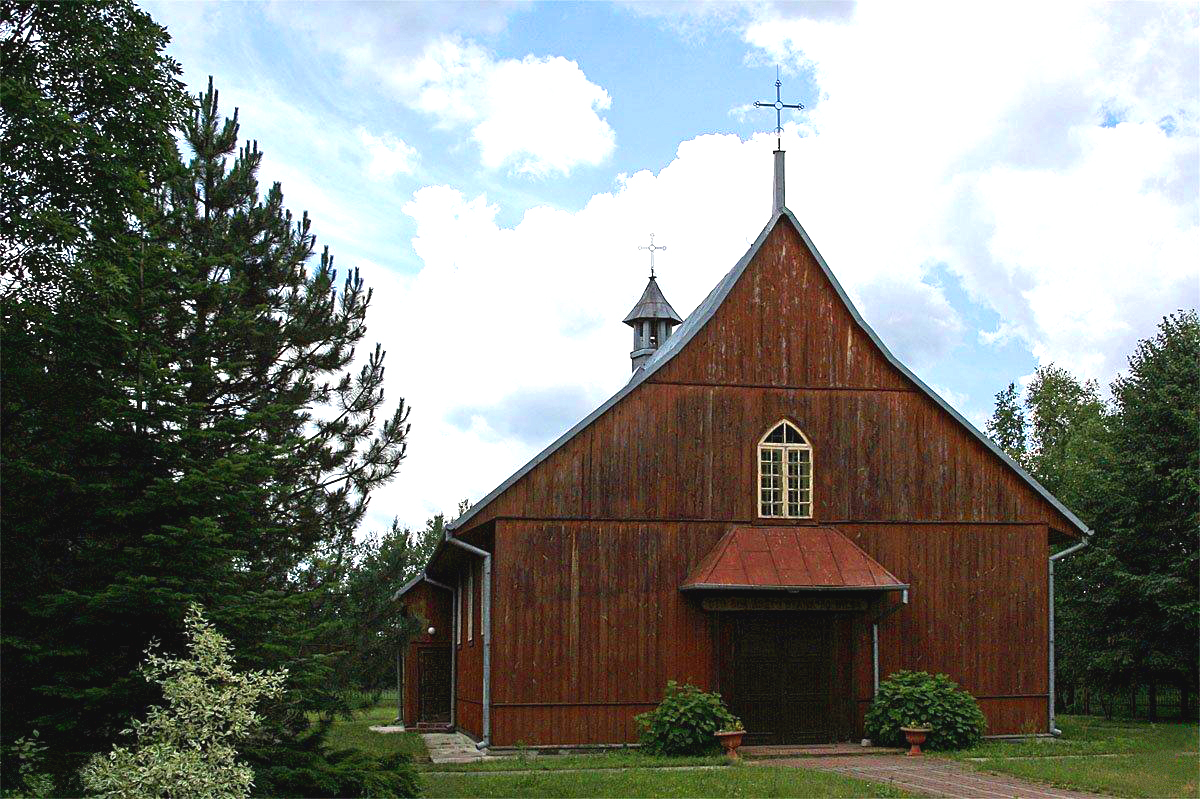
- Sobibór Chapel of the Assumption of Mary
- Interactive map of Sobibór
- Location within Poland
- Coordinates: 51°29′N 23°39′E
- Country: Poland
- Voivodeship: Lublin
- County: Włodawa
- Gmina: Włodawa
- Time zone: UTC+1 (Central European Time)
  - Summer (DST): UTC+2 (Central European Summer Time)
- ISO 3166 code: POL

Sobibór (/ˈsoʊbɪbɔːr/ SOH-bi-bor; Polish: [sobibur], Ukrainian: Собібір, Собібур, Собібор) is a village in the administrative district of Gmina Włodawa, within Włodawa County, Lublin Voivodeship, in eastern Poland. To the south and west is the protected area called Sobibór Landscape Park. It lies close to the Bug River, which forms the border with Belarus and Ukraine.

== Overview ==
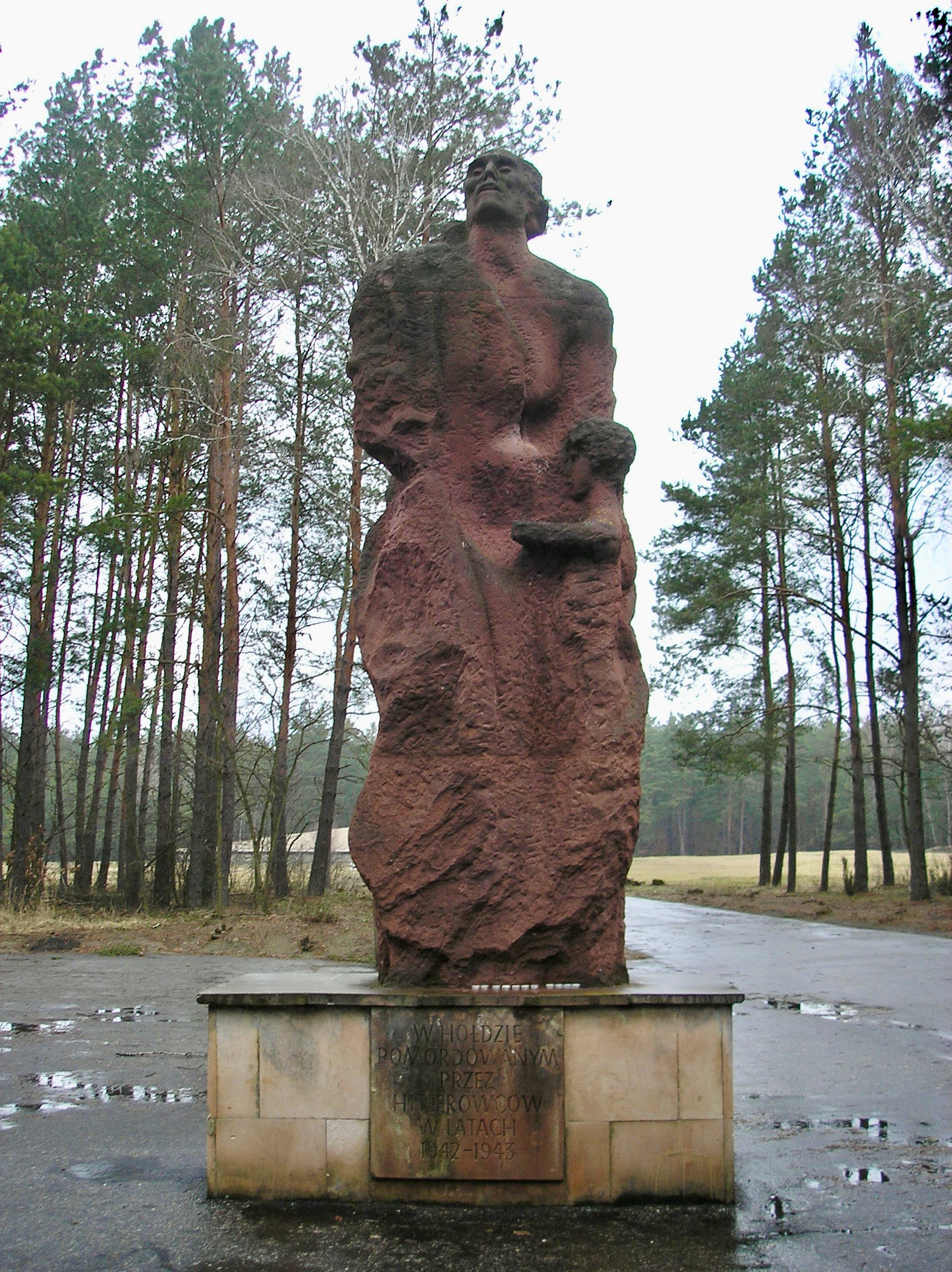
A commemorative statue at the Sobibór Museum

During World War II, the Nazi Sobibor extermination camp was built outside the village. The number of Jews gassed and cremated there between April 1942 and October 14, 1943 is estimated at 250,000. The site of the former camp is now the location of the Sobibór Museum branch of the Majdanek State Museum, devoted to the memory of atrocities committed by Nazi Germany at the Sobibór death camp during the Holocaust in Poland.
