= List of Jewish ghettos in German-occupied Poland =

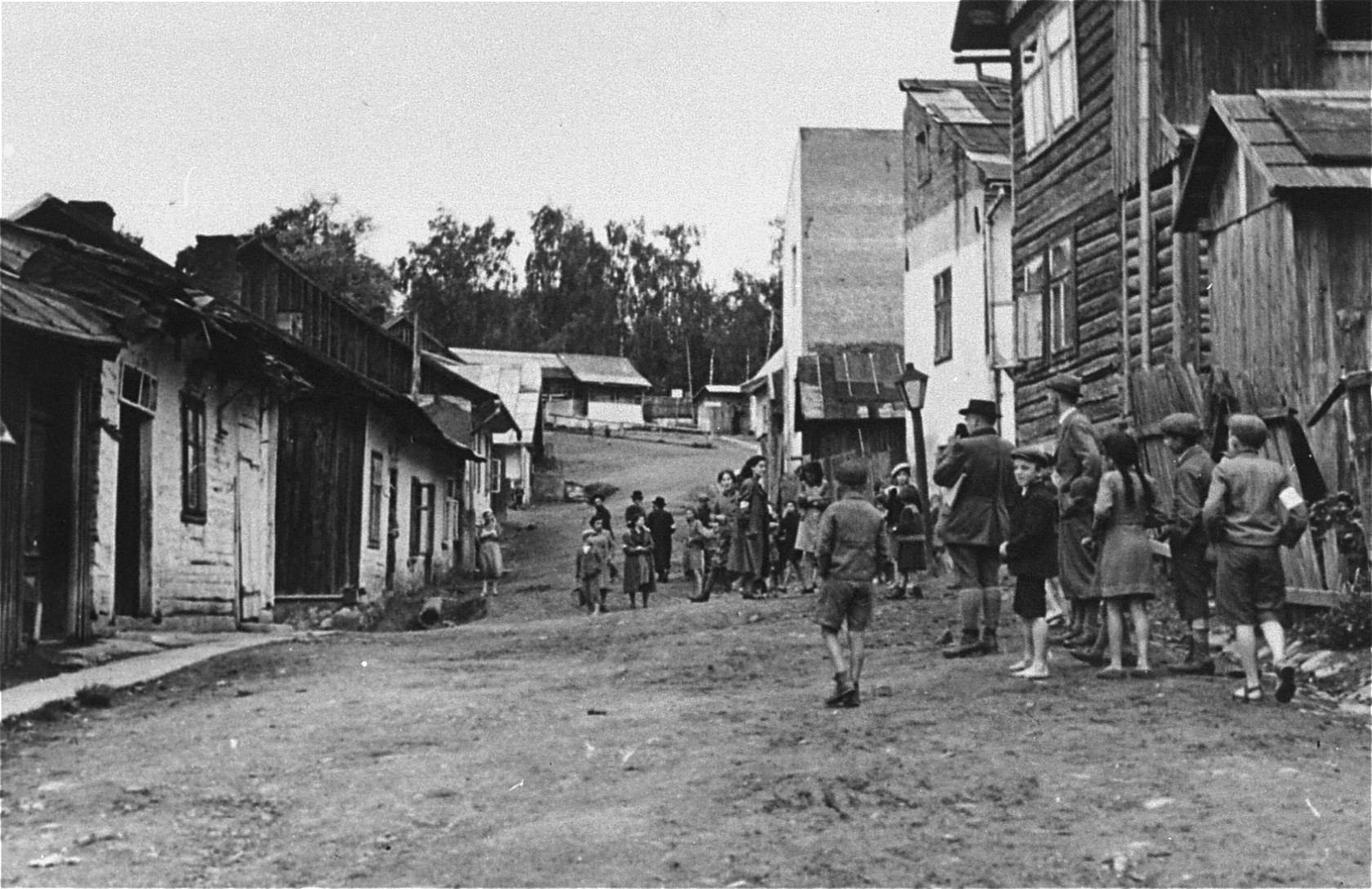
Unpaved street in the Frysztak Ghetto

Ghettos were established by Nazi Germany in hundreds of locations across occupied Poland after the German invasion of Poland. Most ghettos were established between October 1939 and July 1942 in order to confine and segregate Poland's Jewish population of about 3.5 million for the purpose of persecution, terror, and exploitation. In smaller towns, ghettos often served as staging points for Jewish slave-labor and mass deportation actions, while in the urban centers they resembled walled-off prison-islands described by some historians as little more than instruments of "slow, passive murder", with dead bodies littering the streets.

In most cases, the larger ghettos did not correspond to traditional Jewish neighborhoods, and non-Jewish Poles and members of other ethnic groups were ordered to take up residence elsewhere. Smaller Jewish communities with populations under 500 were terminated through expulsion soon after the invasion.

== The Holocaust ==
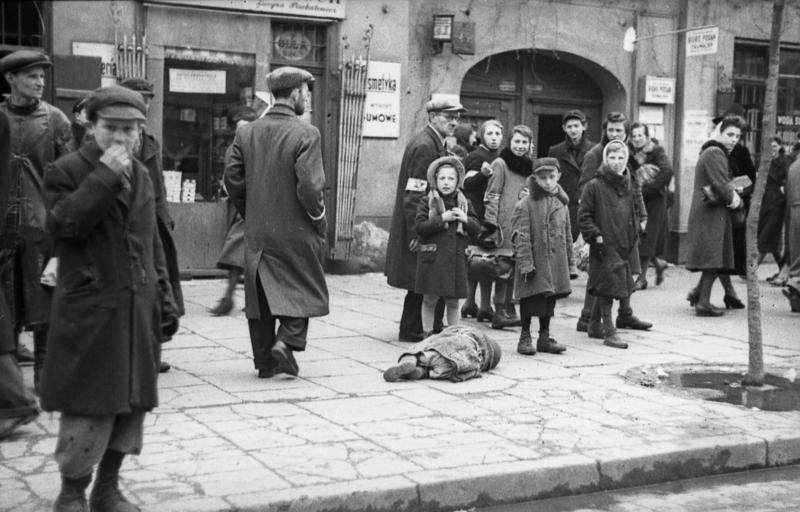
A child lies on the street in the Warsaw Ghetto, May 1941. Photo by the Wehrmacht Propaganda Company 689, now in German Federal Archives

The liquidation of the Jewish ghettos across the occupied Poland was closely connected with the construction of secretive death camps—industrial-scale mass-extermination facilities—built in early 1942 for the sole purpose of murder. The Nazi extermination program depended on rail transport, which enabled the SS to run and, at the same time, openly lie to their victims about the "resettlement program". Jews were transported to their deaths in Holocaust trains from liquidated ghettos of all occupied cities, including Łódź Ghetto, the last in Poland to be liquidated in August 1944. In some larger ghettos there were armed resistance attempts, such as the Warsaw Ghetto Uprising, the Białystok Ghetto Uprising, the Będzin and the Łachwa Ghetto uprisings, but in every case they failed against the overwhelming German military force, and the resisting Jews were either executed locally or deported with the rest of prisoners to the extermination camps. By the time Nazi-occupied Eastern Europe was occupied by the Red Army, not a single Jewish ghetto in Poland was left standing. Only about 50,000–120,000 Polish Jews survived the war on native soil, a fraction of their prewar population of 3,500,000.

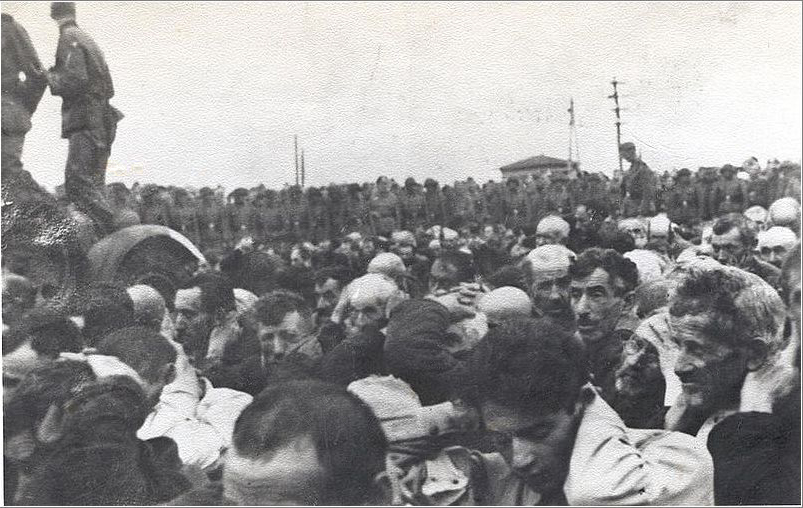
Partial liquidation of the Białystok Ghetto, 15–20 August 1943. Jewish men with their hands up, surrounded by military units

In total, according to archives of the United States Holocaust Memorial Museum, "The Germans established at least 1000 ghettos in German-occupied and annexed Poland and the Soviet Union alone." The list of locations of the Jewish ghettos within the borders of pre-war and post-war Poland is compiled with the understanding that their inhabitants were either of Polish nationality from before the invasion, or had strong historical ties with Poland. Also, not all ghettos are listed here due to their transient nature. Permanent ghettos were created only in settlements with rail connections, because the food aid (paid by the Jews themselves) was completely dependent on the Germans, making even the potato-peels a hot commodity. Throughout 1940 and 1941, most ghettos were sealed off from the outside, walled off or enclosed with barbed wire, and any Jews found outside them could be shot on sight. The Warsaw Ghetto was the largest ghetto in all of Nazi-occupied Europe, with over 400,000 Jews crammed into an area of 3.4 square kilometres (1.3 sq mi), or 7.2 persons per room. The Łódź Ghetto was the second largest, holding about 160,000 inmates. In documents and signage, the Nazis usually referred to the ghettos they created as Jüdischer Wohnbezirk or Wohngebiet der Juden, meaning "Jewish residential area". By the end of 1941, most Polish Jews were already ghettoized, even though the Germans knew that the system was unsustainable; most inmates had no chance of earning their own keep, and no savings left to pay the SS for further deliveries. The quagmire was resolved at the Wannsee Conference of 20 January 1942 near Berlin, where the "Final Solution" ("die Endlösung der Judenfrage") was set in place.

== List of Jewish ghettos in occupied Poland ==
The settlements listed in the Polish language, including major cities, had all been renamed after the 1939 joint invasion of Poland by Germany and the Soviet Union. Renaming everything in their own image had been one way in which the invaders sought to redraw Europe's political map. All Polish territories were assigned as either Nazi zones of occupation (i.e. Bialystok District, Provinz Ostpreußen, etc.), or annexed by the Soviet Union, soon to be overrun again in Operation Barbarossa. The Soviet Ukraine and Byelorussia witnessed the "Polish Operation" of the NKVD, resulting in the virtual absence of ethnic Poles in the USSR along the pre-war border with Poland since the Great Purge.

Ghetto location in prewar and postwar Poland	Population	Date of creation	Date of liquidation	Final destination
(in alphabetical order)		(year, month)	(year, month)	
1939–1940; The first ghetto (Piotrków Trybunalski Ghetto) was set up on 8 October 1939, 38 days after the German invasion of Poland on 1 September 1939. Within months, the most populous Jewish ghettos in World War II, the Warsaw Ghetto and the Łódź Ghetto, had been established.
Aleksandrów Lódzki	3,500	1939	Dec 1939	to Głowno ghetto
Bełżyce	4,500	Jun 1940	May 1943	to Budzyń ghetto → Sobibor and Majdanek
Będzin Ghetto	7,000–28,000	Jul 1940	Aug 1943	to Auschwitz (7,000).
Błonie	2,100	Dec 1940	Feb 1941	to Warsaw Ghetto (all 2,100)
Bodzentyn	700	1940	Sep 1942	to Suchedniów ghetto → Treblinka.
Brześć Kujawski	630	1940	Apr 1942	to Łódź Ghetto → Chełmno death camp
Brześć Ghetto	18,000	December 16, 1941	October 15, 1942	to Brest Fortress and Bronna Góra
Brzesko	4,000–6,000	fall 1941	Sept 1942	to Auschwitz and Belzec
Brzeziny	6,000–6,800	Feb 1940	May 1942	to Łódź Ghetto → Chełmno
Brzozów	1,000	1940	Aug 1942	to Bełżec extermination camp
Bychawa	2,700	1940	Apr 1941	to Belzyce
Chęciny	4,000	1940 – Jun 1941	Sep 1942	to Treblinka
Ciechanów	5,000	1940	Nov 1942	to labour camps (1,500), Mława Ghetto → Auschwitz, many killed locally.
Dąbrowa Górnicza	4,000–10,000	1940	Jun 1943	to Auschwitz
Dęblin–Irena Ghetto	3,300–5,800	Apr 1940	Oct 1942	to Sobibor and Treblinka
Działoszyce	15,000?	Apr 1940	Oct 1942	to Płaszów and Bełżec extermination camp
Gąbin	2,000–2,300	1940	Apr 1942	to Chełmno extermination camp
Głowno	5,600	May 1940	Mar 1941	to Łowicz ghetto and Warsaw Ghetto (5,600)
Gorlice (labor camp 1st)	?	1940	1942	to Buchenwald, Muszyna, Mielec, see Gorlice Ghetto (1941)
Góra Kalwaria	3,300	Jan 1940	Feb 1941	to Warsaw Ghetto (3,000), 300 killed locally
Grodzisk Mazowiecki	6,000	1940 – Jan 1941	Oct 1942	to Warsaw Ghetto (all 6,000)
Grójec	5,200–6,000	Jul 1940	Sep 1942	to Warsaw Ghetto (all 6,000) → Treblinka
Izbica Kujawska	1,000	1940	Jan 1942	to Chełmno extermination camp
Jeżów	1,600	1940	Feb 1941	to Warsaw Ghetto (all 1,600)
Jędrzejów	6,000	Mar 1940	Sep 1942	to Treblinka
Kazimierz Dolny	2,000–3,500	1940 – Apr 1941	Mar 1942	to Sobibor, and Treblinka
Kobyłka	1,500	Sep 1940	Oct 1942	to Treblinka
Koło	2,000–5,000	Dec 1940	Dec 1941	to Treblinka (2,000) and Chełmno
Koniecpol	1,100–1,600	1940	Oct 1942	to Treblinka
Konin	1,500?	Dec 1939	1940 – Mar 1941	to Zagórów & other ghettos → killed locally
Kozienice	13,000	Jan 1940	Sep 1942	to Treblinka
Koźminek	2,500	1940	Jul 1942	to Chełmno
Krasnystaw	2,000	Aug 1940	Oct 1942	to Bełżec extermination camp
Krośniewice	1,500	May 1940	Mar 1942	to Chełmno extermination camp
Kutno	7,000	Jun 1940	Mar 1942	to Chełmno
Legionowo	3,000	1940	1942	to Treblinka
Łańcut	2,700	Dec 1939	Aug 1942	to Bełżec extermination camp
Łask	4,000	Dec 1940	Aug 1942	to Chełmno extermination camp
Łowicz	8,000–8,200	1940	Mar 1941	to Warsaw Ghetto (all; with labor camp)
Łódź Ghetto	200,000	8 Feb 1940	Aug 1944	to Auschwitz and Chełmno extermination camp, labour camps (1,000)
Marki	?	1940 – Mar 1941	1942	to Warsaw Ghetto
Mielec	4,000–4,500	1940	Mar 1942	to Bełżec extermination camp
Mińsk Mazowiecki Ghetto	5,000–7,000	Oct 1940	Aug 1942	to Treblinka, 1,300 killed locally
Mława	6,000–6,500	Dec 1940	Nov 1942	to Treblinka and Auschwitz
Mogielnica	1,500	1940	28 Feb 1942	to Warsaw Ghetto (all) → Treblinka.
Mordy	4,500	Nov 1940	Aug 1942	to Treblinka
Myślenice	1,200	1940	Aug 1942	to Skawina Ghetto (all) → Bełżec
Nowy Dwór Mazowiecki	2,000–4,000	1940 – Jan 1941	Dec 1942	to Pomiechówek ghetto → Auschwitz
Nowy Korczyn	4,000	1940	Oct 1942	to Treblinka
Opoczno	3,000–4,000	Nov 1940	Oct 1942	to Treblinka
Otwock	12,000–15,000	Dec 1939	Aug 1942	to Treblinka, and Auschwitz
Pabianice	8,500–9,000	Feb 1940	May 1942	to Łódź Ghetto → Chełmno death camp
Piaseczno	2,500	1940	Jan 1941	to Warsaw Ghetto (all 2,500)
Piaski (transit)	10,000	1940	Nov 1943	to Bełżec extermination camp, Sobibor, Trawniki concentration camp
Piotrków Trybunalski Ghetto	25,000	8 Oct 1939	14 / 21 Oct 1942	to Majdanek and Treblinka (22,000), killed locally also
Płock	7,000–10,000	1939–1940	Feb 1941	to Działdowo ghetto
Płońsk	12,000	Sep 1940	Nov 1942	to Treblinka, Auschwitz
Poddębice	1,500	Nov 1940	Apr 1942	to Treblinka(?)
Pruszków	1,400	1940	1941	to Warsaw Ghetto (all 1,400)
Przedbórz	4,000–5,000	Mar 1940	Oct 1942	to Bełżec extermination camp and Treblinka
Puławy	5,000	Nov – Dec 1939	1940	to Opole Lubelskie → Sobibor
Radomsko	18,000–20,000	1939 – Jan 1940	21 Jul 1943	to Treblinka extermination camp (18,000)
Radzymin	2,500	Sep 1940	Oct 1942	to Treblinka
Serock	2,000	Feb 1940	Dec 1940	to other ghettos
Sieradz	2,500–5,000	Mar 1940	Aug 1942	to Chełmno extermination camp
Sierpc	500–3,000	1940	Feb 1942	to Warsaw Ghetto → Treblinka
Skaryszew	1,800	1940	Apr 1942	to Szydlowiec
Skierniewice	4,300–7,000	Dec 1940	Apr 1941	to Warsaw Ghetto (all 7,000)
Sochaczew	3,000–4,000	Jan 1940	Feb 1941	to Warsaw Ghetto (all 3,000)
Stalowa Wola	2,500	1940	Jul 1942	to Bełżec extermination camp
Stryj	12,000	1940–1941	Jun 1943	to Bełżec extermination camp
Szadek	500	1940	1940	to other ghettos
Szczebrzeszyn	4,000	1940 – Apr 1941	Oct 1942	to Bełżec death camp, killed locally also
Tomaszów Mazowiecki	16,000–20,000	Dec 1940	Nov 1942	to Treblinka (16,000), with 4,000 killed locally
Tuliszków	230	Dec 1939	Jan 1940	to Kowale Pańskie → Chełmno
Turek	5,000	1940	Oct 1941	to Kowale Pańskie ghetto (all 5,000)
Tyszowce	1,500–2,000	1940	Sep 1942	to Bełżec extermination camp
Uchanie	2,000	1940	Nov 1942	to Sobibor
Ulanów	500	1940	Oct 1942	to other ghettos
Uniejów	500	1940	Oct 1941	to Kowale Pańskie ghetto (all 500)
Warka	2,800	1940	Feb 1941	to Warsaw Ghetto (all 2,800)
Warta	1,000–2,400	Feb 1940	Aug 1942	to Chełmno extermination camp
Warsaw Ghetto, see Muranów neighbourhood of Warsaw (whole)	445,000	Oct – 15 Nov 1940	Sep 1942	to Treblinka extermination camp (300,000), and Majdanek, Trawniki, Poniatowa
Włocławek	4,000–13,500	Oct 1940	Apr 1942	to Chełmno extermination camp
Włodawa	10,500	(sealed) 1941	Apr – May 1943	to Sobibor, also shot locally
Włoszczowa	4,000–6,000	Jul 1940	Sep 1942	to Treblinka
Wodzisław	4,000	Jun 1940	Nov 1942	to Treblinka
Wołomin	3,000–5,500	1940–1942	Apr 1943	to Treblinka
Wyszogród	2,700–3,000	Dec 1940	Nov 1942	to Treblinka
Zagórów	2,000–2,500	Jul 1940	Oct 1941	all killed locally
Zamość	12,000–14,000	1940	May 1943	to Izbica Ghetto → Bełżec, Majdanek
Zduńska Wola	8,300–10,000	1940	Aug 1942	to Chełmno extermination camp
Żychlin	2,800–4,000	Jul 1940	Mar 1942	to Chełmno extermination camp
Żyrardów	3,000–5,000	Dec 1940	Feb 1941	to Warsaw Ghetto (all 5,000)
1941; Under the codename Operation Barbarossa, Germany invaded the Soviet Union on 22 June 1941, followed by the creation of new ghettos and mass murder of Jews by mobile killing squads.
Augustów	4,000	Oct 1941	Jun 1942	to Treblinka and Auschwitz, shot locally
Bełchatów	5,500–6,000	Mar 1941	Aug 1942	to Chełmno extermination camp
Biała Podlaska	7,000–8,400	Jul 1941	Sep 1942	to Majdanek, Sobibor, Treblinka
Biała Rawska	4,000	Sep 1941	Oct 1942	to Treblinka
Białystok Ghetto	40,000–50,000	26 Jul 1941	Nov 1943	to Majdanek, Treblinka
Bielsk Podlaski	11,000–15,100	Aug 1941	Nov 1942	to Treblinka, many killed locally
Biłgoraj	2,500–3,000	1941–1942	Nov 1942	to Bełżec extermination camp
Bobowa	658?	Oct 1941	Aug 1942	to Gorlice and Biecz ghettos
Bochnia	14,000–15,000	Mar 1941	Sep 1943	to Szebnie → Bełżec and Auschwitz
Brześć Litewski Ghetto	18,000	16 Dec 1941	Oct 1942	5,000 shot locally before the ghetto was set up → Bronna Góra ravine
Busko Zdrój	2,000	1941	Oct 1942	to Treblinka
Chełm	8,000–12,000	Jun 1941	Nov 1942	to Sobibor
Chmielnik	10,000–14,000	Apr 1941	Nov 1942	to Treblinka
Chodel	1,400	Jun 1941	1942	to other ghettos
Chrzanów	8,000	Nov 1941	Feb 1943	to Auschwitz
Ciechanowiec	4,000	1941	Nov 1941	to Treblinka
Ciepielów	600	Dec 1941	15 / 29 Oct 1942	to Treblinka → Polish rescuers killed locally 6 Dec 1942.
Czeladź	800	Nov 1941	Feb 1943	to Auschwitz
Częstochowa Ghetto	48,000	9 Apr 1941	22 Sep – 9 Oct 1942	to Treblinka extermination camp
Ćmielów	1,500–2,000?	1941	Oct (end) 1942	to Treblinka (900), rest murdered locally
Dąbie	900	1941	Dec 1941	to Chełmno extermination camp
Dobre	500–1,000	1941	Sep 1942	to Treblinka
Drohiczyn	700	Jun 1941	Nov 1942	to Bransk and Bielsk ghettos
Drzewica	2,000	1941	Oct 1942	to Treblinka
Dubienka	2,500–3,000	Jun 1941	Oct 1942	to other ghettos
Głogów Małopolski	(120)?	1941	1942	to Rzeszów ghetto → 5,000 shot locally
Gniewoszów (open type)	6,580	Dec 1941	Nov 1942	to Zwoleń (5,000); 1,000 → Treblinka
Goniądz	1,000–1,300	Jun 1941	Nov 1942	to Bogusze ghetto
Gorlice	4,500	Oct 1941	Aug 1942	to Bełżec extermination camp
Gostynin	3,500	1941	Aug 1942	to Chełmno extermination camp
Grajewo	3,000	Jun 1941	Nov 1942	to Bogusze ghetto
Hrubieszów (open type)	6,800–10,000	Jun 1941 – May 1942	May – Nov 1943	to Sobibor and Budzyn labour camp, many shot locally, 2,000 fled.
Iłża	1,900–2,000	1941	Oct 1942	to Treblinka
Inowłódz	500–600	1941	Aug 1942	to Tomaszow Mazowiecki ghetto
Iwacewicze	600	1941	14 Mar 1942	to Słonim Ghetto, all killed locally
Izbica Ghetto (transit)	12,000–22,700	1941	2 Nov 1942	to Bełżec extermination camp and Sobibor, 4,500 killed locally
Jasło	2,000–3,000	1941	Aug 1942	to other ghettos
Jedwabne	100–130	Jul 1941	Nov 1941	to Łomża Ghetto → Treblinka, 340 killed locally.
Kalisz	400	1941	1942	to other ghettos
Kałusz	6,000	Jun 1941	Nov 1942	to Bełżec extermination camp, several hundreds executed locally
Karczew	700	Mar 1941	Oct 1941	to Warsaw Ghetto
Kielce Ghetto	27,000	Mar 1941	Aug 1942	to Treblinka, with 6,000 killed locally
Kłobuck	2,000	1941	Jun 1942	to Auschwitz
Knyszyn	2,000	Jun 1941	Nov 1942	to Białystok Ghetto
Kobryn	8,000	Jun 1941	Oct 1942	all killed locally
Kock	2,500–3,000	Jun 1941	Dec 1942	to Treblinka
Kodeń	?	Jun 1941	Sep 1942	to Miedzyrzec Podlaski Ghetto
Kolbuszowa	2,500	1941	Sep 1942	to Bełżec extermination camp
Koluszki	2,000	1941	Oct 1942	to Treblinka
Końskie	10,000	1941	Jan 1943	to Treblinka
Korczyn	2,000	1941	Aug 1942	to Bełżec extermination camp
Kraków Ghetto	20,000 (pop. 68,500)	Mar 1941	Mar 1943	to Bełżec extermination camp and Płaszów; 48,000 expelled in 1940.
Kraśnik	5,000–6,000	1940–1941	Nov 1942	to Bełżec extermination camp
Krynki	5,000–6,000	Jun – Nov 1941	Nov 1942	to Kiełbasin transit camp → Treblinka
Książ Wielki	200?	1941	Nov 1942	to Miechów ghetto
Kunów	500	1941	Oct 1942	to Treblinka
Limanowa	2,000	1941	Aug 1942	to Bełżec extermination camp
Lipsk	3,000	Dec 1941	Oct 1942	to Treblinka
Lubartów Ghetto	3,269–4,500	Jun 1941	Oct 1942	to Bełżec extermination camp
Lublin Ghetto	30,000–40,000	24 Mar 1941	Nov 1942	to Bełżec extermination camp (30,000) and Majdanek (4,000)
Lwów Ghetto	115,000–160,000	Jun – Nov 1941	Jun 1943	to Bełżec extermination camp and Janowska concentration camp
Łapy	600	Jun – Jul 1941	Nov 1942	to Białystok Ghetto
Łaskarzew	1,300	1941	Sep 1942	to Treblinka
Łęczyca	3,000–4,300	1941	Jun 1942	to Chełmno, many killed locally
Łomża Ghetto	9,000–11,000	Jun 1941	Nov 1942	to Auschwitz, many killed locally
Łosice	5,500–6,000	1941	Aug 1942	to Treblinka
Łuków	10,000	1941	Oct – Nov 1942	to Treblinka (Oct: 7,000; Nov: 3,000)
Łuck Ghetto	25,000	Dec 1941	19 / 24 Aug 1942	all killed locally (most at Polanka)
Maków Mazowiecki	3,500–5,000	1941	Dec 1942	to Treblinka
Michałowo	1,500	1941	Nov 1942	to Białystok Ghetto
Miechów	4,000	1941	1942	to Bełżec (1,000 killed locally)
Nowe Miasto	3,700	1941	22 Oct 1942	to Treblinka (3,000), rest killed locally
Nowogródek	6,000?	Jun 1941	Oct 1942	all killed locally
Nowy Sącz Ghetto	20,000	Aug 1941	Aug 1942	to Bełżec extermination camp
Nowy Targ	2,500	1941	Aug 1942	to Bełżec extermination camp
Nowy Żmigród	1,300	1941	Jul 1942	all killed locally
Olkusz	3,000–4,000	1941	Jun 1942	to Auschwitz
Opatów Ghetto	10,000	1941	Oct 1942	to Treblinka
Opole Lubelskie	8,000–10,000	1941	Oct 1942	to Sobibor and Poniatowa ghetto
Osiek	500	1941	Jun 1942	to Ożarów ghetto → Treblinka
Ostrowiec Świętokrzyski	16,000	Apr 1941	10 Jan 1943	to Treblinka
Ozorków	3,000–5,000	1941	Aug 1942	to Łódź Ghetto → Chełmno
Pajęczno	3,000	1941	1942	to Łódź Ghetto
Parczew	7,000	1941	Oct 1942	to Treblinka
Piątek	?	1941	Jul 1942	to Chełmno extermination camp
Pilzno	788?	1941	Jun 1942	to Bełżec extermination camp
Pińczów	3,000–3,500	1941	Oct 1942	to Treblinka
Pionki (labor camp)	682	1941	Aug 1942	to Zwoleń ghetto → Treblinka
Połaniec	2,000	1941	1942	to Chełmno extermination camp
Praszka	?	1941	Aug 1942	to Chełmno extermination camp
Rabka	300	1941	Aug 1942	to Bełżec extermination camp
Radom Ghetto	30,000–32,000	Mar 1941	Aug 1942	to Treblinka extermination camp
Radomyśl Wielki	1,300?	1941	1942	to Bełżec extermination camp
Radoszyce	3,200?	1941	Nov 1942	to Treblinka
Radzyn Podlaski	2,000–3,000	1941	Dec 1942	to Treblinka
Rajgród	1,200	1941	Nov 1942	to Bogusze
Rawa Mazowiecka	4,000	1941	Oct 1942	to Treblinka
Rejowiec	3,000	1941	1943	to Auschwitz, Sobibor and Majdanek
Ropczyce	800	1941	Jul 1942	to Bełżec extermination camp
Ryki	1,800–3,500	1941	Oct 1942	to Treblinka and Sobibor
Rymanów	1,600?	1941	Aug 1942	to Kraków Ghetto, Bełżec extermination camp, killed locally
Sędziszów Małopolski	2,000	1941	Jan 1942	to Bełżec
Siedlce Ghetto	12,000–18,000	Jun – Aug 1941	Nov 1942	to Treblinka
Siemiatycze	7,000	1941	Nov 1942	to Sobibor
Sieniawa	3,000	1941	1942	all killed locally
Siennica	700?	1941	15 Sep 1942	to Treblinka (700)
Skarżysko-Kamienna	3,000	1941	1942	to Treblinka (2,500), the rest killed locally
Skrzynno	?	1941	Oct 1942	to Opoczno ghetto
Słonim Ghetto	22,000	Jul 1941	15 Jul 1942	all killed locally (Jul-41: 1,200; Nov: 9,000; Jul-42: 10,000)
Słuck	3,000–8,500	Jun 1941	Nov 1942	all killed locally
Sokołów Małopolski	3,000	1941	Jul 1942	to Bełżec
Sokołów Podlaski	4,000–7,000	Jun 1941	Sep 1942	to Treblinka
Sokółka	8,000–9,000	Jun 1941	Nov 1942	to Kiełbasin → Treblinka
Solec	800	1941	Dec 1942	to Tarlow ghetto
Stanisławów Ghetto	20,000	Dec 1941	Feb 1943	killed locally → to Bełżec
Starachowice	6,000	Apr 1941	Oct 1942	to Treblinka
Stary Sącz	1,000	1941	Aug 1942	to Bełżec
Staszów	7,000	1941	Dec 1942	to Treblinka
Stopnica	5,000	1941	Nov 1942	to Treblinka, many killed locally
Strzemieszyce Wielkie	1,800	1940–1941	May – 15 Jun 1942	to Będzin Ghetto (500), Auschwitz (1,400)
Strzyżów	1,300	1941	26 / 28 Jun 1942	to Rzeszów ghetto, killed locally → Bełżec
Suchedniów	5,000	1941	Aug 1942	to Treblinka
Sulejów	1,500	1941	Oct 1942	to Treblinka
Szczuczyn	2,000	1941	Jul – Nov 1942	to Bogusze transit camp, killed locally
Śniadowo	650	1941	Nov 1942	to Zambrow ghetto
Tarczyn	1,600	1941	Feb 1942	to Treblinka
Tarnobrzeg (ghetto & camp)	500	Jun 1941	Jul 1942	to Dębica ghetto → Bełżec
Tarnogród	2,600–5,000	1941	Nov 1942	to Bełżec from ghetto & camp, many killed locally
Tarnopol Ghetto	20,000	Jul – Aug 1941	Jun 1943	to Bełżec, many killed locally
Tarnów	40,000	Mar 1941	Sep 1943	10,000 killed locally, Bełżec (10,000), Auschwitz
Tomaszów Lubelski	1,400–1,500	1941	Oct 1942	to Bełżec
Tyczyn	?	1941	Jul 1942	to Bełżec extermination camp
Wadowice	1,400	1941	Aug 1943	to Auschwitz
Wąwolnica	2,500	1941	May 1942	to Bełżec extermination camp
Węgrów	6,000–8,300	1941	Sep 1942	to Treblinka
Wieliczka	7,000	1941	Aug 1942	to Bełżec extermination camp
Wielun	4,200–7,000	1941	Aug 1942	to Chełmno extermination camp, killed locally
Wieruszów	1,400	1941	Aug 1942	to Chełmno extermination camp
Wilno Ghetto	30,000–80,000	Sep 1941	Sep 1943	killed locally (21,000 before ghetto was set up)
Wiślica	2,000	1941	Oct 1942	to Jędrzejów ghetto
Wolbrom	3,000–5,000	1941	Sep 1942	to Bełżec, many killed locally
Wysokie Mazowieckie	5,000	1941	Nov 1942	to Zambrow ghetto
Zabłudów	1,800	Jul 1941	2 Nov 1942	10th Calvary camp near Białystok → Treblinka (1,400)
Zambrów	3,200–4,000	1941	Jan 1943	to Auschwitz, mass killings locally
Zawiercie	5,000–7,000	1941	Oct 1943	to Auschwitz (5,000)
Zelów	?	1941	Sep 1942	to Chełmno extermination camp
Zwoleń (open type)	6,500–10,000	1941	29 Sep 1942	to Treblinka extermination camp (8,000)
Żarki	3,200	1941	Oct 1942	to Treblinka
Żelechów	5,500–13,000	1941	Sep 1942	to Treblinka
1942; On January 20, 1942, at the Wannsee Conference near Berlin, Reinhard Heydrich informed senior Nazi officials that "the final solution of the Jewish question" was deportation from the ghettos and subsequent mass extermination of the Jews. Implementation plan developed. Six death factories were built by German firms in occupied Poland within two-to-six months.
Andrychów	700	Sep 1942	Nov 1943	to Auschwitz concentration camp
Annopol	?	Jun 1942	Oct 1942	to Kraśnik ghetto
Baranów Sandomierski	2,000	Jun 1942	Jul 1942	to Dębica ghetto, (all)
Biecz	700–800	Apr 1942	Aug 1942	to Bełżec extermination camp
Czortków	4,000	Apr 1942	Sep 1943	to Bełżec extermination camp
Dąbrowa Tarnowska	2,400–3,000	Oct 1942	Sep 1943	to Bełżec extermination camp and Auschwitz
Dębica	1,500–4,000	1942	Mar 1943	to Bełżec extermination camp
Drohobycz Ghetto	10,000	Mar 1942	Jun 1943	to Bełżec extermination camp
Dubno	9,000?	Apr 1942	Oct 1942	all killed locally
Frysztak Ghetto	1,600	1942	18 Aug 1942	to Jasło ghetto → killed in Warzyce forest
Hrubieszów (labor camp)	200	May 1942	May 1943	to Budzyn, killed locally, see Hrubieszów # 122 above (6,800)
Jasienica Rosielna	1,500	1942	Aug 1942	to Bełżec extermination camp
Kołomyja (ghetto & camp)	18,000	1942	Feb 1943	to Bełżec extermination camp, many killed locally
Koprzywnica	1,800	1940	Oct 1942	to Treblinka
Kowale Pańskie	3,000–5,000	1939–1942	1942	to Chełmno extermination camp
Kowel	17,000	May 1942	Oct 1942	all killed locally
Kraśnik (ghetto & camp)	5,000	1940–1942	Nov 1942	to Bełżec extermination camp
Krosno	600–2,500	Aug 1942	Dec 1942	to Bełżec extermination camp
Lesko	2,000	1942	Sep 1942	to Bełżec extermination camp
Lubaczów	4,200–7,000	Oct 1942	Jan 1943	to Sobibor, many killed locally
Łachwa Ghetto	2,350	4 Apr 1942	Sep 1942	killed locally, 1,500 in an uprising.
Łęczna	3,000	Jun 1942	Nov 1942	to Sobibor, many killed locally
Międzyrzec Podlaski Ghetto	20,000	28 Aug 1942	18 Jul 1943	to Treblinka (17,000), hundreds killed locally.
Ożarów	4,500	Jan 1942	Oct 1942	to Treblinka
Pińsk Ghetto	26,200	Apr 1942	Oct 1942	to Bronna Góra (3,500), the rest killed locally
Przemyśl	22,000–24,000	Jul 1942	Sep 1943	to Bełżec extermination camp, Auschwitz, Janowska
Przeworsk	1,400?	Jul 1942	Oct 1942	to Bełżec extermination camp
Przysucha	2,500–5,000	Jul – 15 Aug 1942	27 / 31 Oct 1942	to Treblinka (5,000)
Sambor Ghetto	8,000–9,000	Mar 1942	Jul 1943	to Bełżec extermination camp, many killed locally
Sosnowiec Ghetto	12,000	Oct 1942	Aug 1943	to Auschwitz
Starachowice (labor camp)	13,000	1942	1942	to Treblinka, see also Starachowice ghetto
Stryj	4,000–12,000	1942	Jun 1943	all killed locally
Sucha Beskidzka	400	1942	1943	to Auschwitz
Szydłów	1,000	Jan 1942	Oct 1942	to Chmielnik ghetto
Tarnogród (labor camp)	1,000	1942	1942	see Tarnogród ghetto → Bełżec extermination camp
Tomaszów M. (labor camp)	1,000	1942	May 1943	to Starachowice, see also Tomaszów Mazowiecki Ghetto (1940)
Tuchów	3,000	Jun 1942	Sep 1942	to Bełżec extermination camp
Zdzięcioł Ghetto	4,500	22 Feb 1942	30 Apr – 6 Aug 1942	killed locally during Zdzięcioł massacres

== Aftermath ==
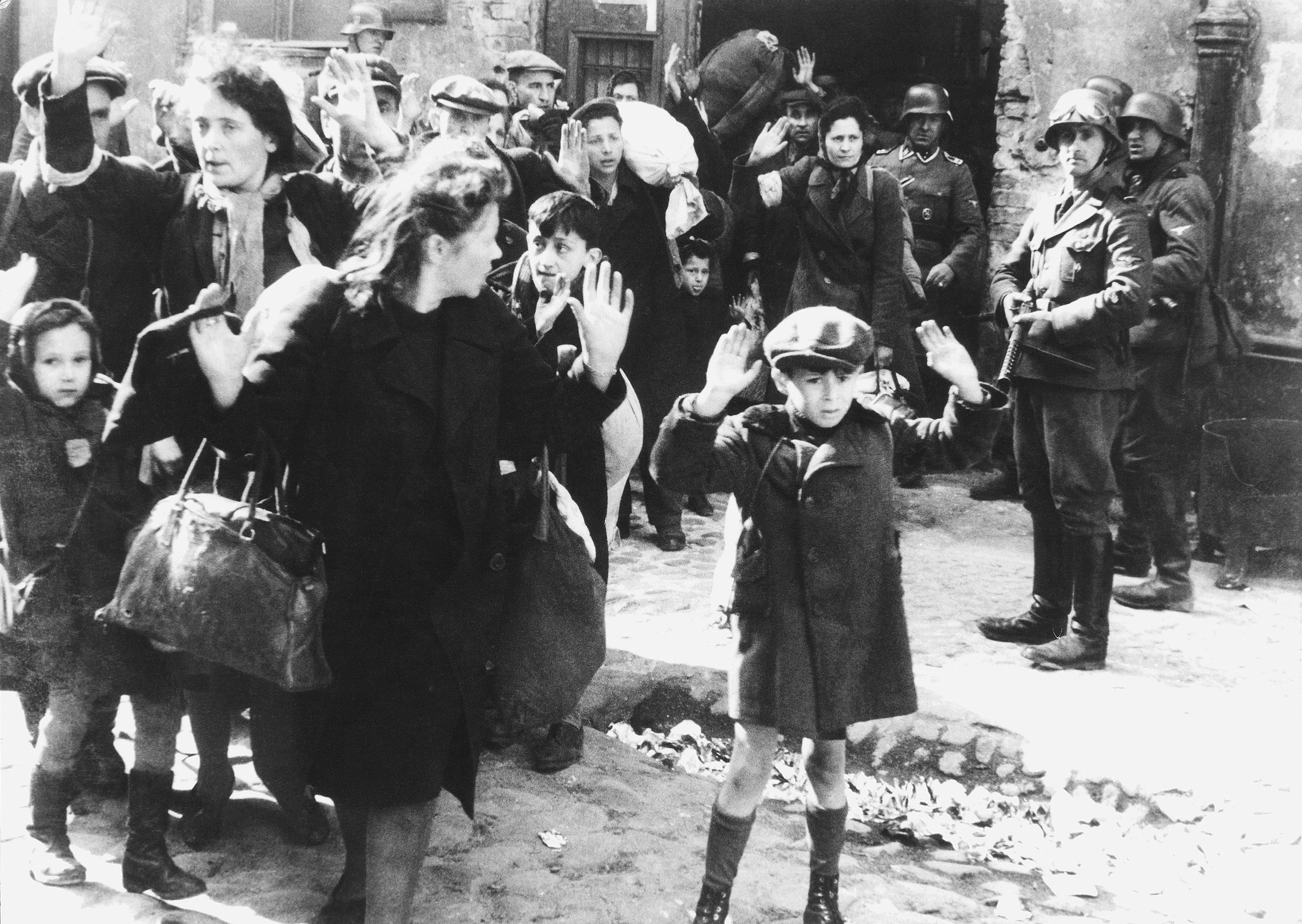
Jewish women and children rounded up for deportation to a death camp during the Warsaw Ghetto Uprising

The ghetto inhabitants – most of whom were murdered during Operation Reinhard – possessed Polish citizenship before the Nazi–Soviet invasion of Poland, which in turn enabled over 150,000 Holocaust survivors registered at CKŻP to take advantage of the later repatriation agreements between the governments of Poland and the Soviet Union, and legally emigrate to the West to help form the nascent State of Israel. Poland was the only Eastern Bloc country to allow free Jewish aliyah without visas or exit permits upon the conclusion of World War II. By contrast, Stalin forcibly brought Soviet Jews back to USSR along with all Soviet citizens, as agreed to in the Yalta Conference.

Some Jewish populations remained in the ghettos after their destruction. Many Jewish people were not able to leave the ghettos, either because they were too destitute or because they were still surrounded by Germans. This resulted in many of the ghettos' inhabitants dying from harsh conditions such as exposure, lack of food, and diseases. Those who left faced the challenge of seeking a place where they as displaced people could be resettled.

== See also ==
- Jewish ghettos established by Nazi Germany
- Jewish ghettos in Europe
- Chronicles of Terror
- German camps in occupied Poland during World War II
- Nazi crimes against the Polish nation
- Timeline of Treblinka extermination camp
- Warsaw Ghetto Hunger Study
