= Oblęgorek =

- Village
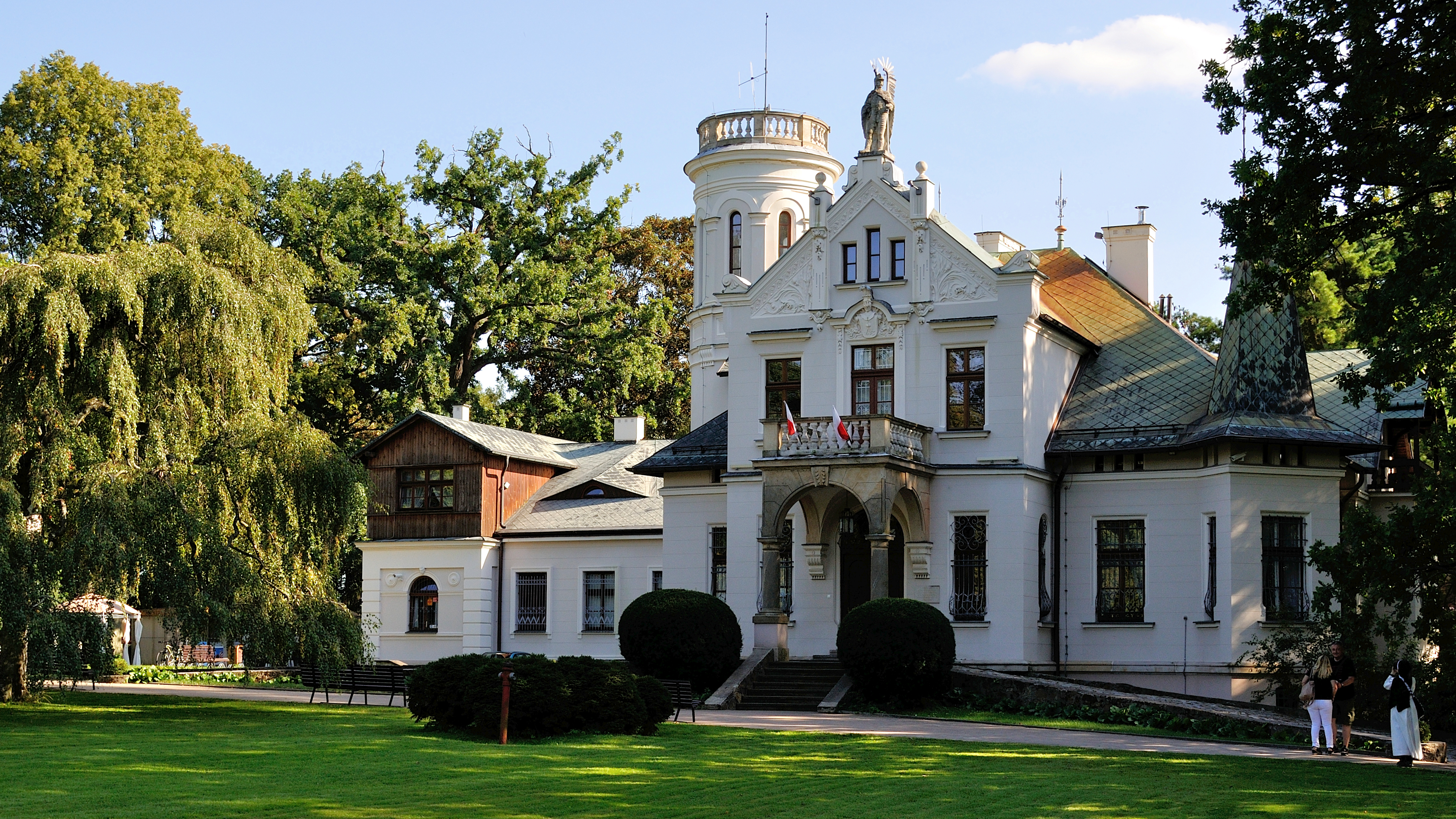
- Henryk Sienkiewicz Chateau

- Location within Poland
- Coordinates: 50°57′12″N 20°29′17″E
- Country: Poland
- Voivodeship: Świętokrzyskie
- County: Kielce
- Gmina: Strawczyn

Population
  - Total: 950

Oblęgorek [ɔblɛŋˈɡɔrɛk] is a village in the administrative district of Gmina Strawczyn, within Kielce County, Świętokrzyskie Voivodeship, in south-central Poland. It lies approximately 5 km (3 mi) east of Strawczyn and 12 km (7 mi) north-west of the regional capital Kielce.

The Henryk Sienkiewicz Museum is located in Oblęgorek.

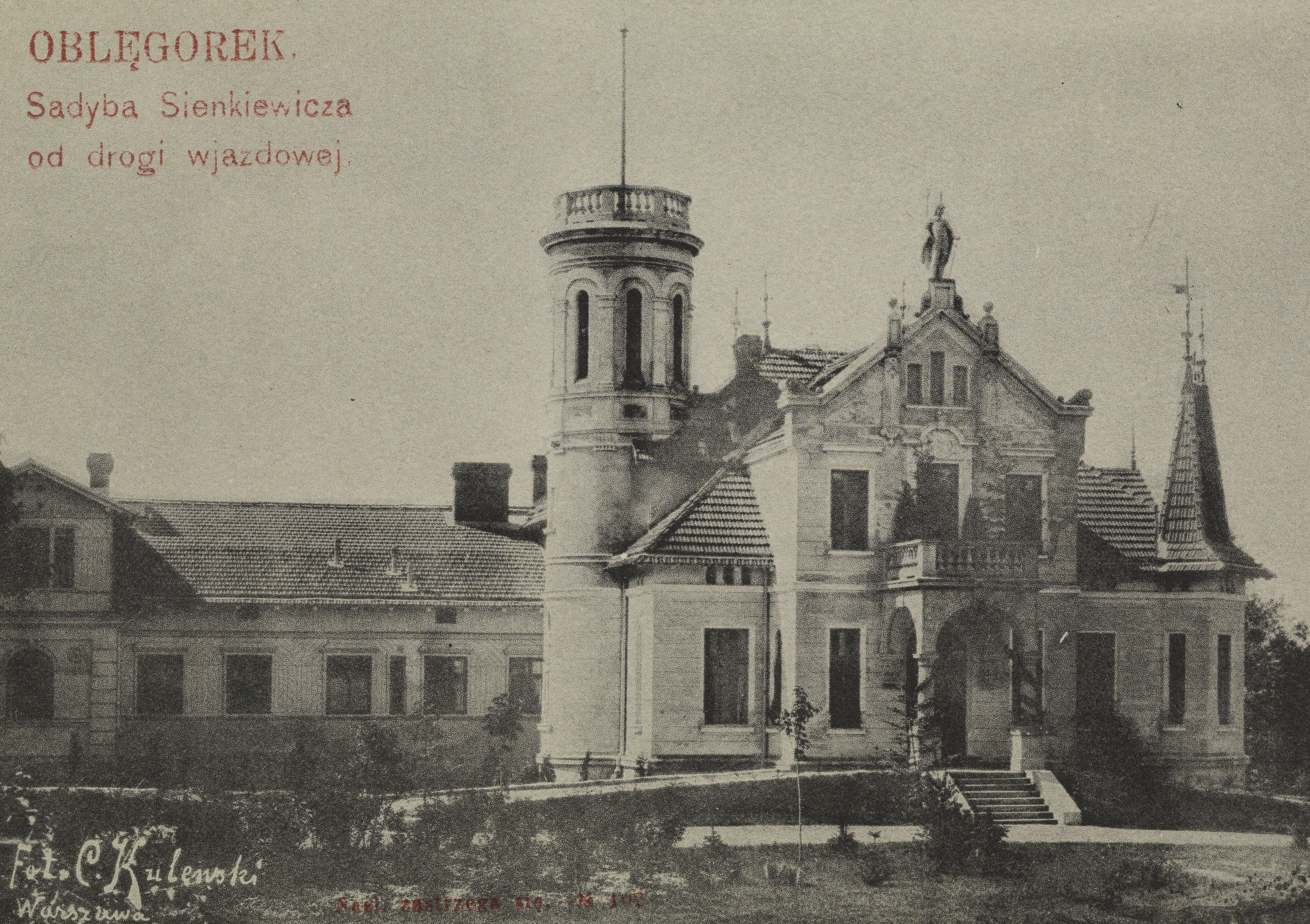
Henryk Sienkiewicz Chateau, ca 1902

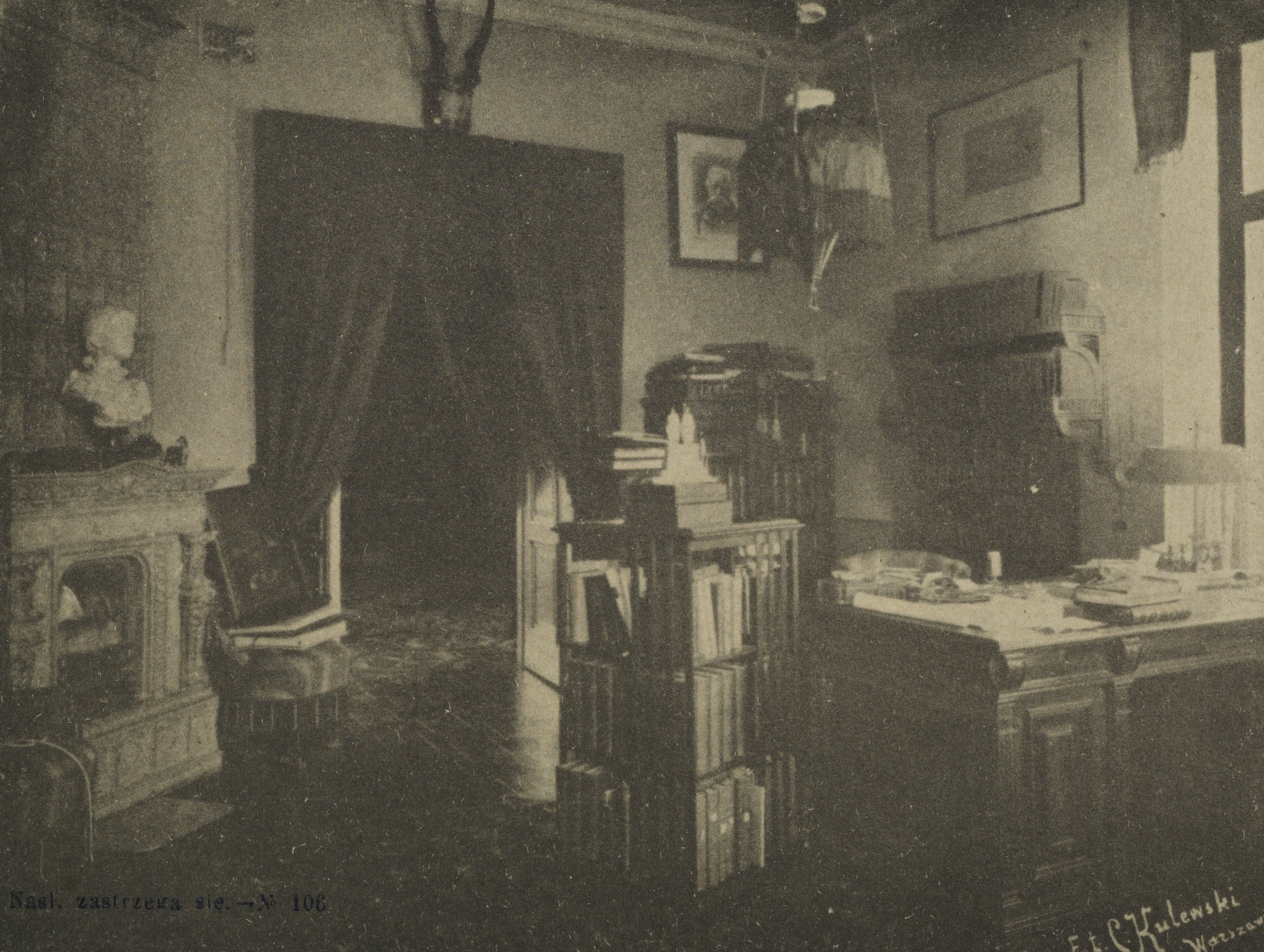
Sienkiewicz's room, ca 1902

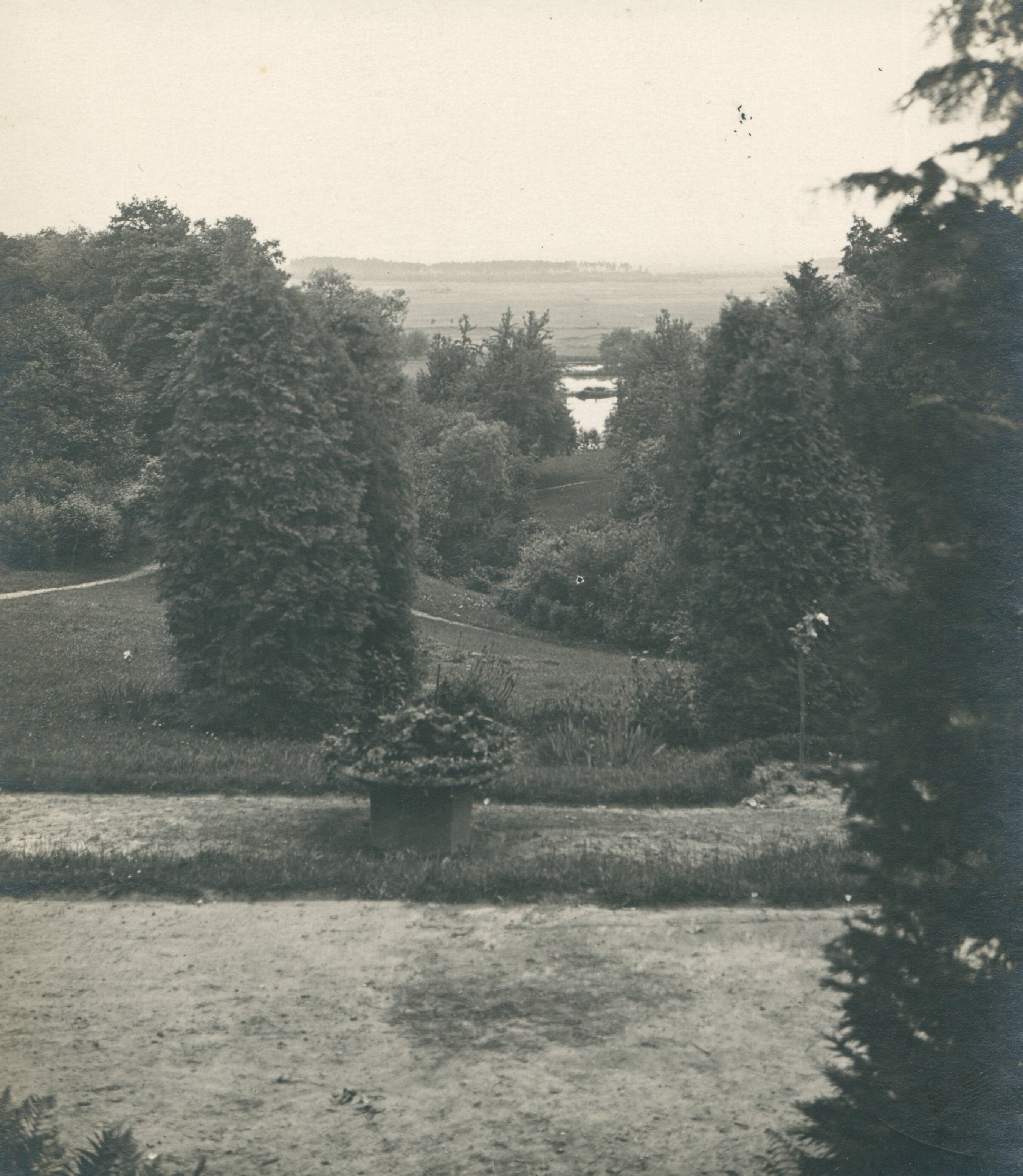
Park, 1920-1929

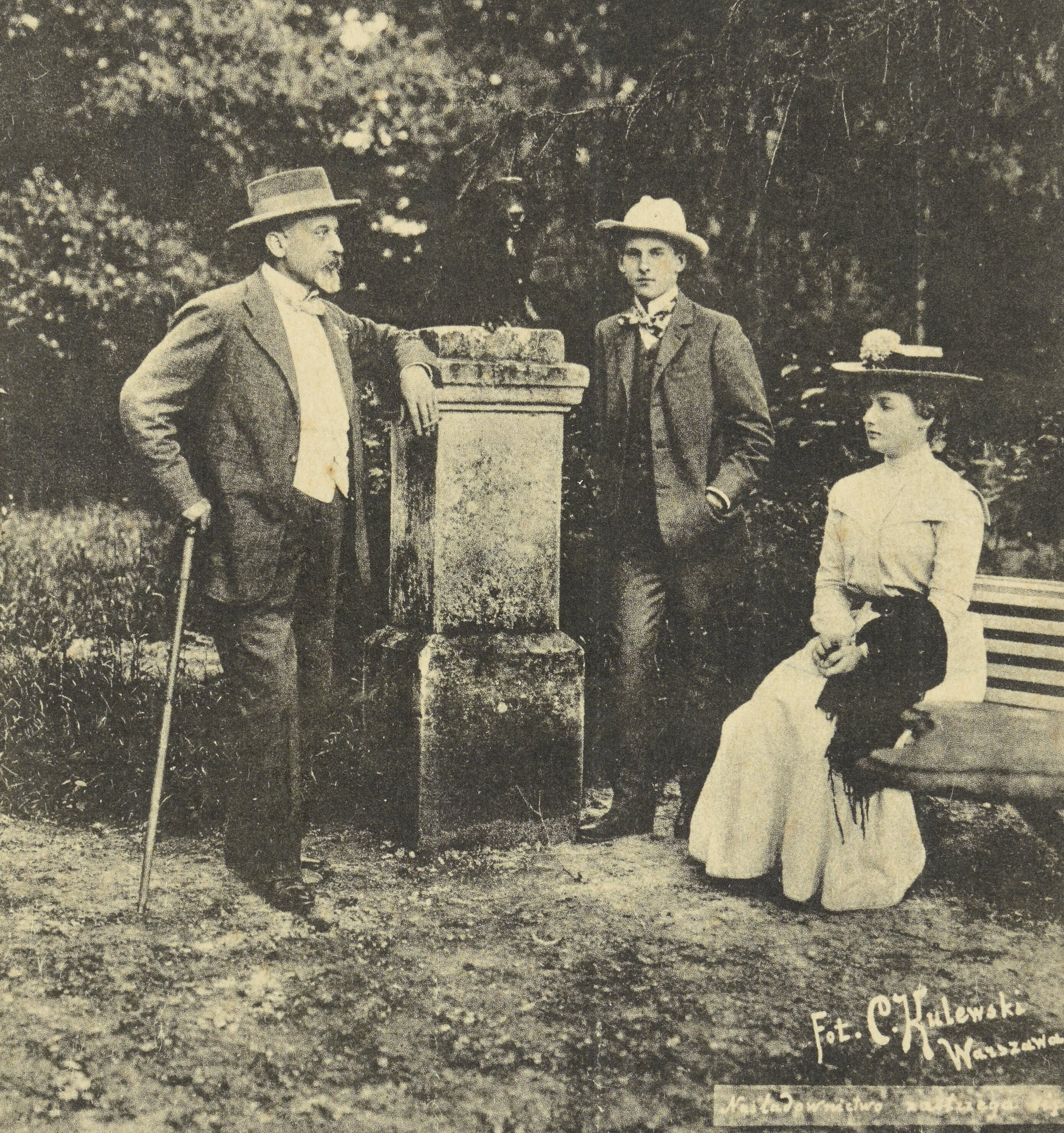
Sienkiewicz with childrem, ca 1902
