= Hucisko, Gmina Strawczyn =

Hucisko
- Village
- Location within Poland
- Coordinates: 50°58′5″N 20°23′41″E
- Country: Poland
- Voivodeship: Świętokrzyskie
- County: Kielce
- Gmina: Strawczyn
- Population (2020): 475

Hucisko [xuˈt͡ɕiskɔ] is a village in the administrative district of Gmina Strawczyn, within Kielce County, Świętokrzyskie Voivodeship, in south-central Poland. It lies approximately 4 km (2 mi) north-west of Strawczyn and 19 km (12 mi) north-west of the regional capital Kielce.
