= Strawczynek =

- Village
- Location within Poland
- Coordinates: 50°56′25″N 20°26′46″E
- Country: Poland
- Voivodeship: Świętokrzyskie
- County: Kielce
- Gmina: Strawczyn
- Population: 940

Strawczynek [strafˈt͡ʂɨnɛk] is a village in the administrative district of Gmina Strawczyn, within Kielce County, Świętokrzyskie Voivodeship, in south-central Poland. It lies approximately 2 km (1 mi) east of Strawczyn and 14 km (9 mi) north-west of the regional capital Kielce.
