= Małogoskie =

- Village
- Location within Poland
- Coordinates: 50°54′47″N 20°22′46″E
- Country: Poland
- Voivodeship: Świętokrzyskie
- County: Kielce
- Gmina: Strawczyn
- Population (approx.): 130

Małogoskie [mawɔˈɡɔskʲɛ] is a village in the administrative district of Gmina Strawczyn, within Kielce County, Świętokrzyskie Voivodeship, in south-central Poland. It lies approximately 5 km (3 mi) south-west of Strawczyn and 17 km (11 mi) west of the regional capital Kielce.
