= Chełmce =

Chełmce may refer to the following places:

- Chełmce, Greater Poland Voivodeship (west-central Poland)
- Chełmce, Łódź Voivodeship (central Poland)
- Chełmce, Świętokrzyskie Voivodeship (south-central Poland)
