= Ruda Strawczyńska =

- Village
- Location within Poland
- Coordinates: 50°56′46″N 20°22′12″E
- Country: Poland
- Voivodeship: Świętokrzyskie
- County: Kielce
- Gmina: Strawczyn
- Population: 710

Ruda Strawczyńska [ˈruda strafˈt͡ʂɨɲska] is a village in the administrative district of Gmina Strawczyn, within Kielce County, Świętokrzyskie Voivodeship, in south-central Poland. It lies approximately 4 km (2 mi) west of Strawczyn and 19 km (12 mi) west of the regional capital Kielce.
