= Kuźniaki =

- Village
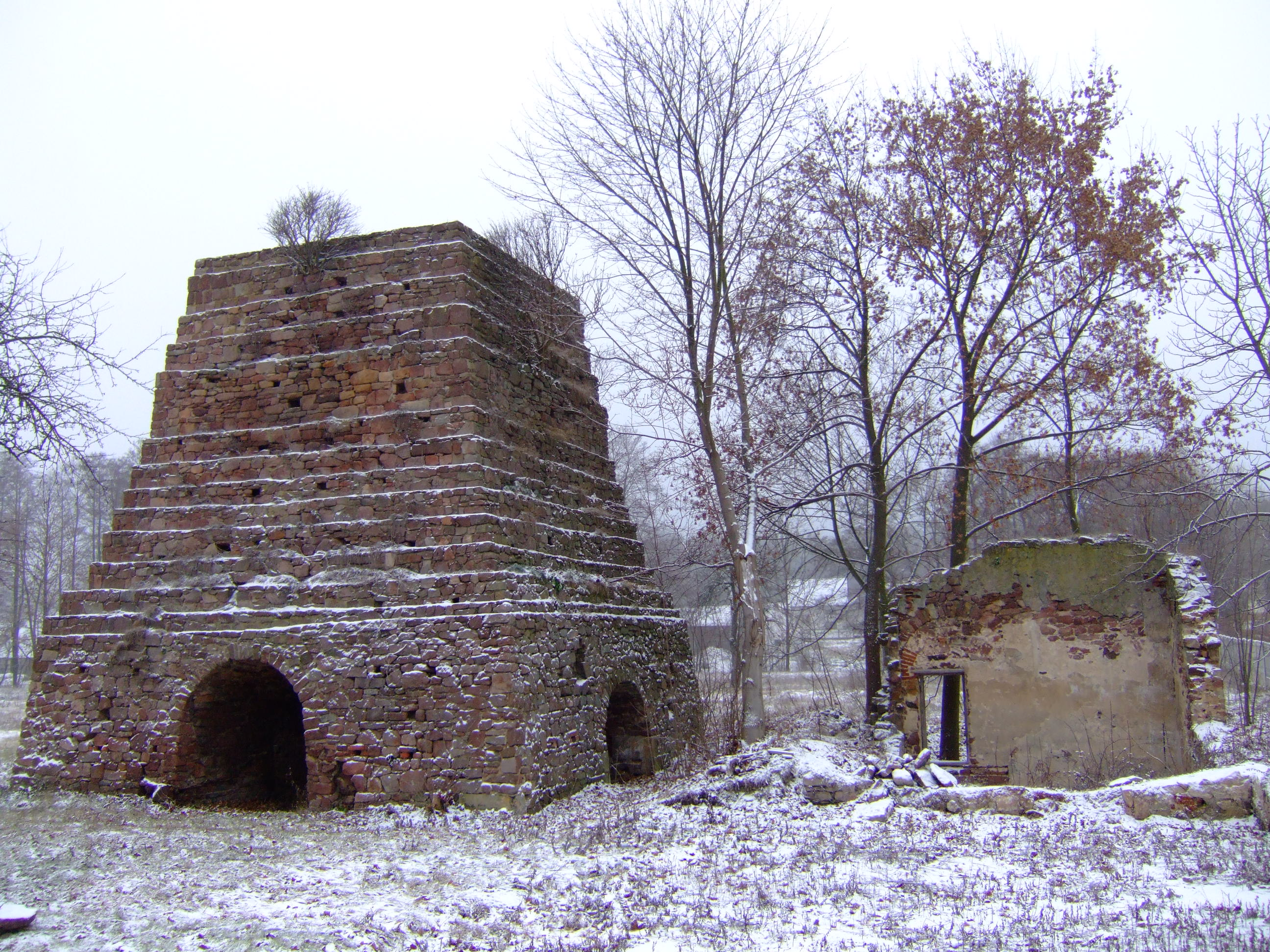

- Location within Poland
- Coordinates: 50°58′30″N 20°21′34″E
- Country: Poland
- Voivodeship: Świętokrzyskie
- County: Kielce
- Gmina: Strawczyn
- Population: 470

Kuźniaki [kuʑˈɲaki] is a village in the administrative district of Gmina Strawczyn, within Kielce County, Świętokrzyskie Voivodeship, in south-central Poland. It lies approximately 6 km (4 mi) north-west of Strawczyn and 21 km (13 mi) north-west of the regional capital Kielce.
