= Niedźwiedź, Kielce County =

Niedźwiedź
- Village
- Location within Poland
- Coordinates: 50°57′25″N 20°25′48″E
- Country: Poland
- Voivodeship: Świętokrzyskie
- County: Kielce
- Gmina: Strawczyn
- Population: 430

Niedźwiedź [ˈɲɛd͡ʑvjɛt͡ɕ] is a village in the administrative district of Gmina Strawczyn, within Kielce County, Świętokrzyskie Voivodeship, in south-central Poland. It lies approximately 2 km (1 mi) north-east of Strawczyn and 16 km (10 mi) north-west of the regional capital Kielce.
