= Oblęgór =

- Village
- Location within Poland
- Coordinates: 50°57′19″N 20°28′0″E
- Country: Poland
- Voivodeship: Świętokrzyskie
- County: Kielce
- Gmina: Strawczyn
- Population: 870

Oblęgór [ɔˈblɛŋɡur] is a village in the administrative district of Gmina Strawczyn, within Kielce County, Świętokrzyskie Voivodeship, in south-central Poland. It lies approximately 4 km (2 mi) north-east of Strawczyn and 14 km (9 mi) north-west of the regional capital Kielce.
