= Bugaj, Kielce County =

Bugaj
- Village
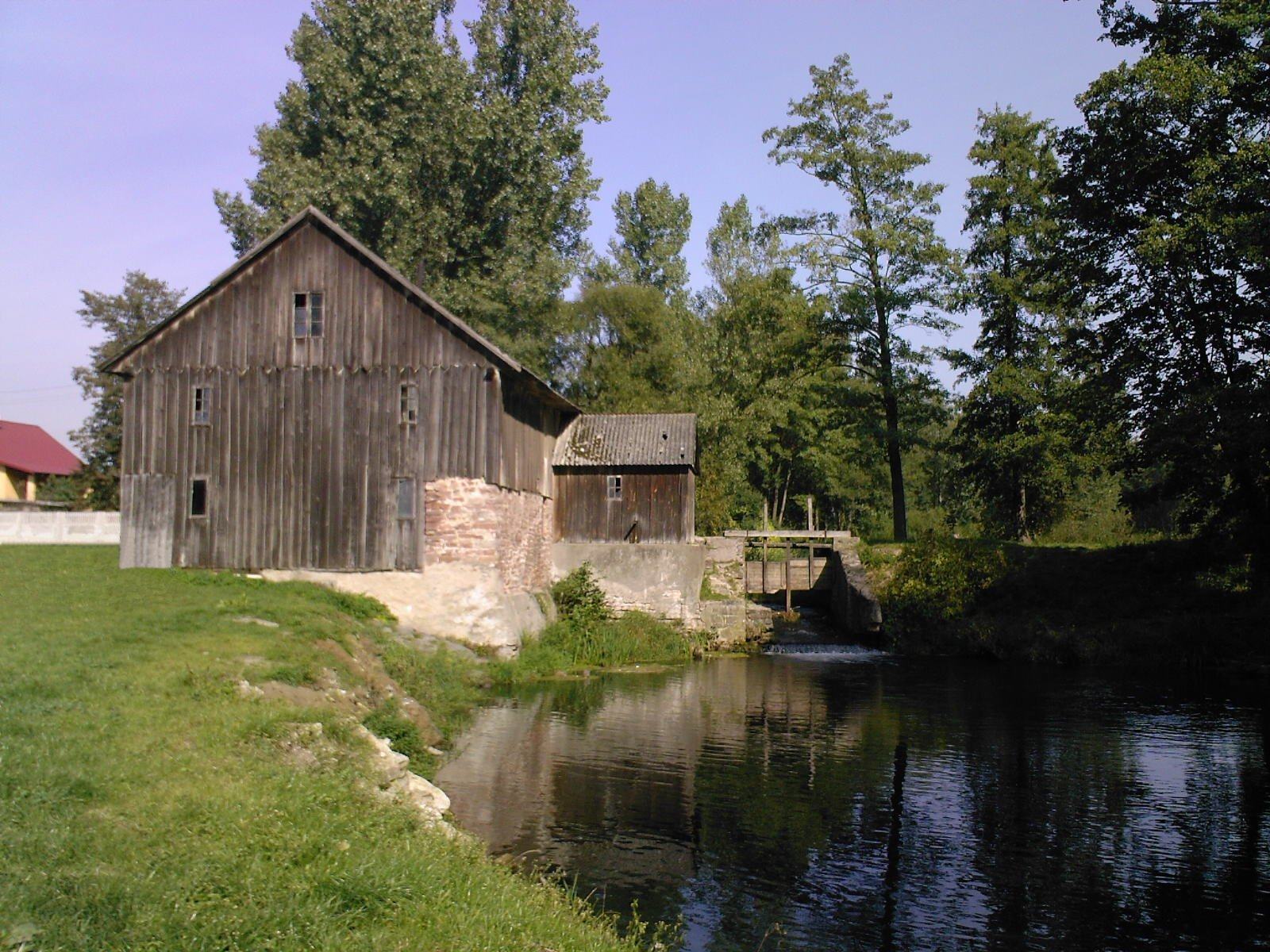

- Location within Poland
- Coordinates: 50°56′20″N 20°30′37″E
- Country: Poland
- Voivodeship: Świętokrzyskie
- County: Kielce
- Gmina: Strawczyn
- Population: 150

Bugaj [ˈbuɡai̯] is a village in the administrative district of Gmina Strawczyn, within Kielce County, Świętokrzyskie Voivodeship, in south-central Poland. It lies approximately 7 km (4 mi) east of Strawczyn and 10 km (6 mi) north-west of the regional capital Kielce.
