= President of Poland =

Head of state

President of the Republic of Poland
- Prezydent Rzeczypospolitej Polskiej (Polish)
- Presidential pennant

- Incumbent; Karol Nawrocki since 6 August 2025
- Executive branch of the Polish Government
- Style: Mr. President (informal); His Excellency (diplomatic)
- Status: Head of state Commander-in-chief
- Member of: National Security Council; National Development Council
- Residence: Presidential Palace (current); Belweder (alternative)
- Appointer: Popular vote
- Term length: Five years, renewable once
- Constituting instrument: Constitution of Poland (1997)
- Precursor: Chief of State
- Formation: 11 December 1922; 103 years ago 19 July 1989; 37 years ago (current form)
- First holder: Gabriel Narutowicz
- Deputy: Marshal of the Sejm
- Salary: 294,000 zł annually
- Website: Official website

The president of Poland (Polish: Prezydent Polski [ˈprɛ.zɘ.dɛnt ˈpɔl.ski]), officially the president of the Republic of Poland (Polish: Prezydent Rzeczypospolitej Polskiej (Prezydent RP)), is the head of state of Poland. The president's prerogatives and duties are determined in the Constitution of Poland. The president jointly exercises the executive power together with the Council of Ministers headed by the prime minister. The president has a right to dissolve both chambers of parliament in certain cases determined by the constitution, can veto legislation, represents the Republic on the international stage, and is the commander-in-chief of the nation's Armed Forces.

== History ==
The first president of Poland, Gabriel Narutowicz, was sworn in as president of the Second Polish Republic on 11 December 1922. He was elected by the National Assembly (the Sejm and the Senate) under the terms of the 1921 March Constitution. Narutowicz was assassinated on 16 December 1922. Previously Józef Piłsudski had been "Chief of State" (Naczelnik Państwa) under the provisional Small Constitution of 1919. In 1926 Piłsudski staged the "May Coup", overthrew President Stanisław Wojciechowski and had the National Assembly elect a new one, Ignacy Mościcki, thus establishing the "Sanation regime". Before Piłsudski's death, parliament passed a more authoritarian 1935 April Constitution of Poland (not in accord with the amendment procedures of the 1921 March Constitution). Mościcki continued as president until he resigned in 1939 in the aftermath of the German invasion of Poland. Mościcki and his government went into exile in Romania, where Mościcki was interned. In Angers, France, Władysław Raczkiewicz, at the time the speaker of the Senate, assumed the presidency after Mościcki's resignation on 29 September 1939. Following the fall of France, the president and the Polish government-in-exile were evacuated to London, United Kingdom. The transfer from Mościcki to Raczkiewicz was in accordance with Article 24 of the 1935 April Constitution. Raczkiewicz was followed by a succession of presidents in exile, of whom the last one was Ryszard Kaczorowski.

In 1945–54, Poland became a part of Soviet-controlled central-eastern Europe. Bolesław Bierut assumed the reins of government and in July 1945 was internationally recognised as the head of state. The Senate was abolished in 1946 by the Polish people's referendum. When the Sejm passed the Small Constitution of 1947, based in part on the 1921 March Constitution, Bierut was elected president by that body. He served until the Constitution of the Polish People's Republic of 1952 eliminated the office of the president, replacing it with a collective leadership called the Council of State (Polish: Rada Państwa).

Following the 1989 amendments to the constitution which restored the presidency, general Wojciech Jaruzelski, the existing head of state, took office. In Poland's first direct presidential election, Lech Wałęsa won and was sworn in on 22 December 1990. The office of the president was preserved in the Constitution of Poland passed in 1997; the constitution now provides the requirements for, the duties of and the authority of the office.

The topic of creation the presidency role as a single-person position was meant to safeguard slow, gentle political change to keep the interests of the ruling party. By March 1989, a compromise regarding the creation of the institution of the presidency was reached between the government and the opposition. In return for a constitutionally defined presidency with various competences, the ruling party agreed to relinquish its position as managing organ within the state. The presidency would be created along with the restoration of a freely elected upper house, the Senate. The president would be elected by a joint session of the lower house (Sejm) and the Senate. By this way, representatives of the opposition, sitting in the Senate, would be involved in the political process of electing the president.

The Small constitution of October 17, 1992 created a parliamentarisation of the political system and while the presidency remained in the active model, it was deprived of far-reaching governing powers.

In recent years, newly elected presidents have renounced formal ties with their political party before taking office.

== Election ==
The president of Poland is elected directly by the people to serve for five years and can be reelected only once. Pursuant to the provisions of the Constitution, the president is elected by an absolute majority. If no candidate succeeds in passing this threshold, a second round of voting is held with the participation of the two candidates with the largest and second largest number of votes respectively.

In order to be registered as a candidate in the presidential election, one must be a Polish citizen, be at least 35 years old on the day of the first round of the election, and collect at least 100,000 signatures of registered voters.

== Powers ==
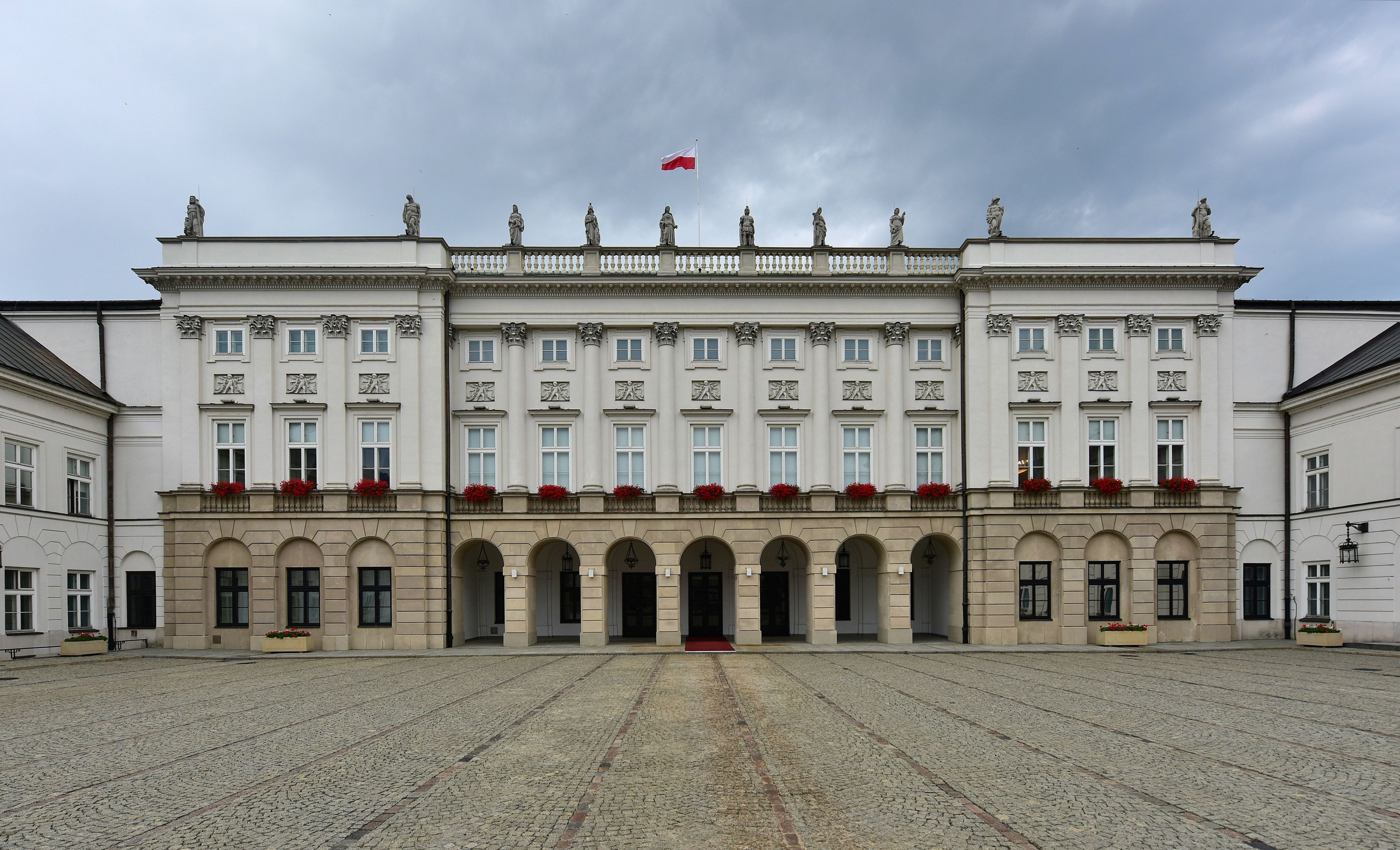
The Presidential Palace in Warsaw serves as the official seat of presidency.

Article 126 paragraph 1 states that the president is the supreme representative of the state, rather than the people, a privilege reserved for the deputies of the Sejm and senators of the Senate. The constitution confirms for the president the role of securing the continuity of state authority. The position of the presidency has an arbiter function (while not directly mentioned, unlike France or Romania), with the president playing a major role in the political system, assisted by a set of legal instruments with which they can exert influence on the organs of state authority and the political system.

The president has a free choice in selecting the prime minister, yet in practice they usually give the task of forming a new government to a politician supported by the political party with the majority of seats in the Sejm (usually, though not always, it is the leader of that political party).

The president has the right to initiate the legislative process. They also have the opportunity to directly influence it by using their veto to stop a bill; however, a veto can be overruled by a three-fifths majority vote in the presence of at least half of the statutory number of members of the Sejm (230). Before signing a bill into law, the president can also ask the Constitutional Tribunal to verify its compliance with the Constitution, which in practice bears a decisive influence on the legislative process.

In their role as supreme representative of the Polish state, the president has the power to ratify and revoke international agreements, nominates and recalls ambassadors, and formally accepts the accreditations of representatives of other states. The president also makes decisions on award of highest academic titles, as well as state distinctions and orders. In addition, they have the right of clemency, viz. they can dismiss final court verdicts (in practice, the president consults such decisions with the minister of justice).

The president is also the commander-in-chief of the armed forces; they appoint the chief of the general staff and the commanders of all of the service branches; in wartime, they nominate the supreme commander of the Armed Forces and can order a general mobilisation. The president performs their duties with the help of the following offices: the Chancellery of the President, the Office of National Security, and the Body of Advisors to the President.

== Presidential residencies and properties ==
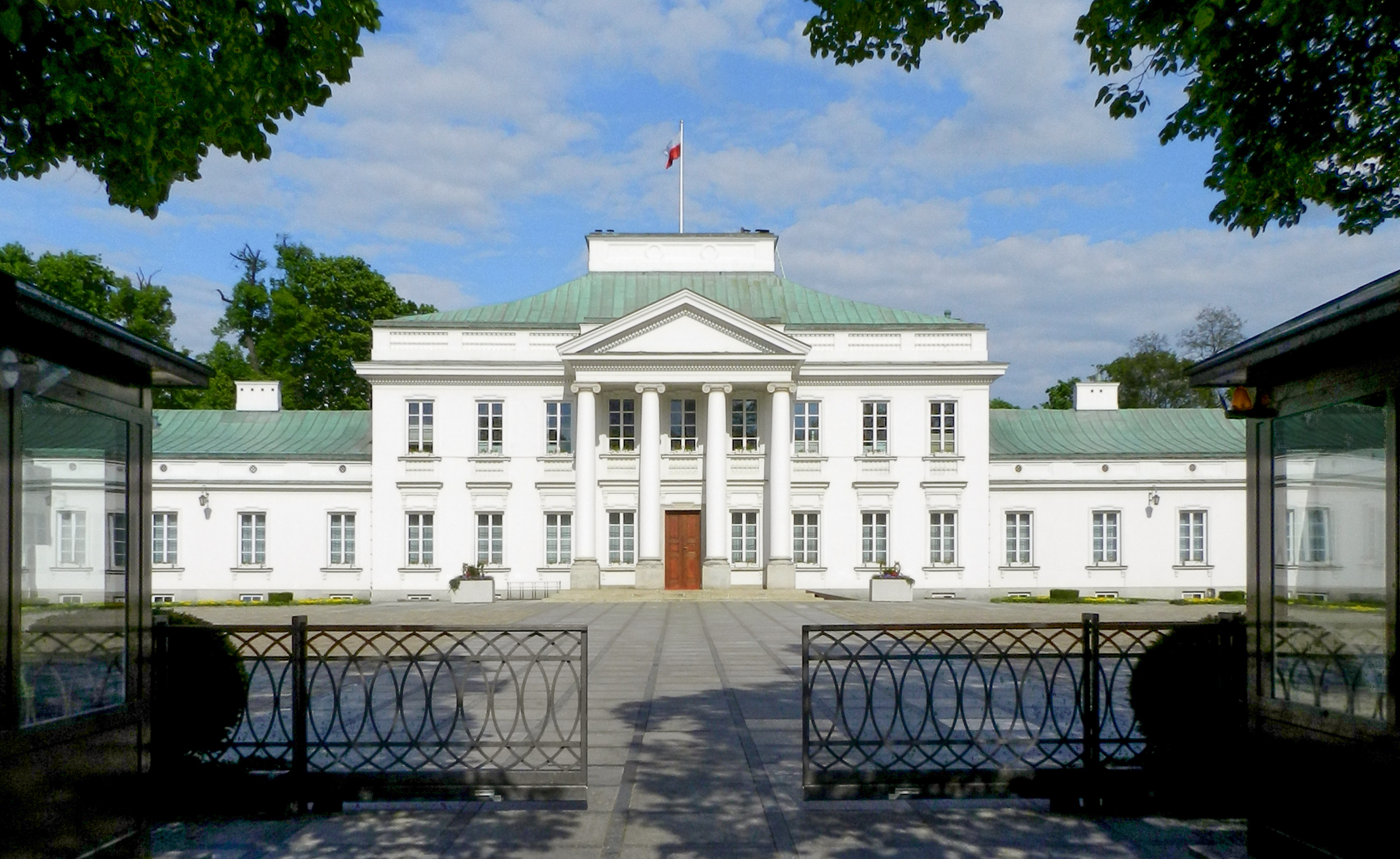
The Belweder Palace, often known simply as 'Belvedere', is the traditional (now secondary) official residence of the president.

Several properties are owned by the Office of the President and are used by the head of state as their official residence, private residence, residence for visiting foreign officials etc.

- The Presidential Palace in Warsaw is the largest palace in Warsaw and the official seat of the president of the Republic of Poland since 1993. The first presidential tenant was Lech Wałęsa when he moved to the Palace from Belweder in 1994.
- Belweder, in Warsaw, was the official seat of the president until 1993. It is currently owned by the Office of the President as the official residence of the President and is used by the president and the government for ceremonial purposes. The palace also serves as an official residence for heads of state on official visits to Poland and other important guests.
- The Presidential Castle in Wisła in a château built for the Habsburgs as their hunting cottage. It was rebuilt 1929–1931 and used as recreational residence by Ignacy Mościcki, President 1926–1939. Since 2002 it is again a property of the president, restored and opened in 2005 by President Kwaśniewski. It is today a recreational and conference centre for the president and a hotel.
- Residence of the President of the Republic of Poland in Lucień
- Manor House of the President of the Republic of Poland in Ciechocinek
- Presidential Residence "Jurata-Hel" in Hel, the president's Baltic coastal retreat
- Summer residence at the Hel Peninsula
- Presidential Villa in Promnik
- Presidential Villa in Klarysew

== Acting president of Poland ==
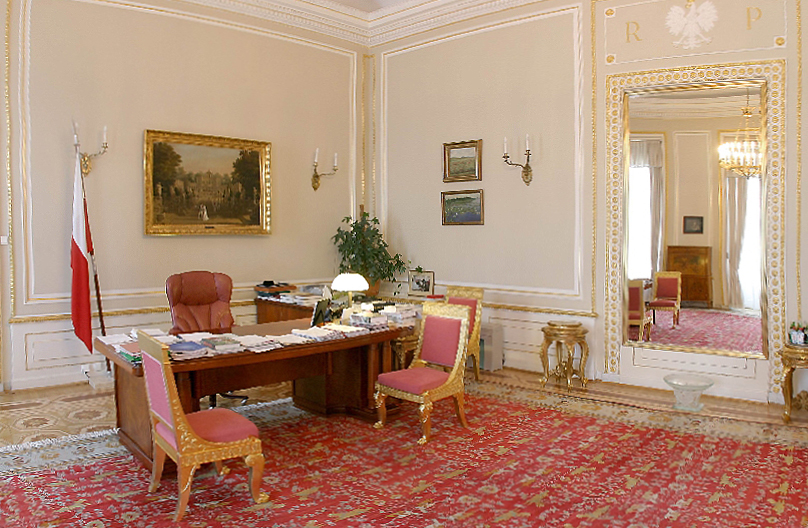
The office of the president at the Presidential Palace in Warsaw

The constitution states that the president is an elected office, there is no directly elected presidential line of succession. If the president is unable to execute their powers and duties, the marshal of the Sejm will have the powers of a president for a maximum of 60 days until elections are called.

On 10 April 2010, a plane carrying Polish president Lech Kaczyński, his wife, and 94 others including many Polish officials crashed near Smolensk North Airport in Russia; there were no survivors. Bronisław Komorowski took over acting presidential powers following the incident. On 8 July, Komorowski resigned from the office of Marshal of the Sejm after winning the presidential election. According to the constitution, the acting president then became the marshal of the Senate, Bogdan Borusewicz. In the afternoon Grzegorz Schetyna was elected as a new marshal of the Sejm and he became acting president. Schetyna served as the interim head of state until the swearing-in of Komorowski on 6 August.

== Former presidents ==
Within Poland, former presidents are entitled to lifetime personal security protection by State Protection Service officers, in addition to receiving a substantial pension and a private office. On 10 April 2010, Lech Kaczyński, president at the time, along with Ryszard Kaczorowski, the last president-in-exile although not internationally recognised as such, died in the crash of a Polish Air Force Tu-154 en route to Russia to mark the 70th anniversary of the Katyn massacre.

== See also ==
- List of heads of state of Poland
- List of Polish monarchs
- Naczelnik Państwa
- Polish government-in-exile
- Polish presidential elections of
  - 1990, 1995, 2000, 2005, 2010, 2015, 2020, 2025
- Prime Minister of Poland
- Smolensk air disaster
