= Frysztak Ghetto =

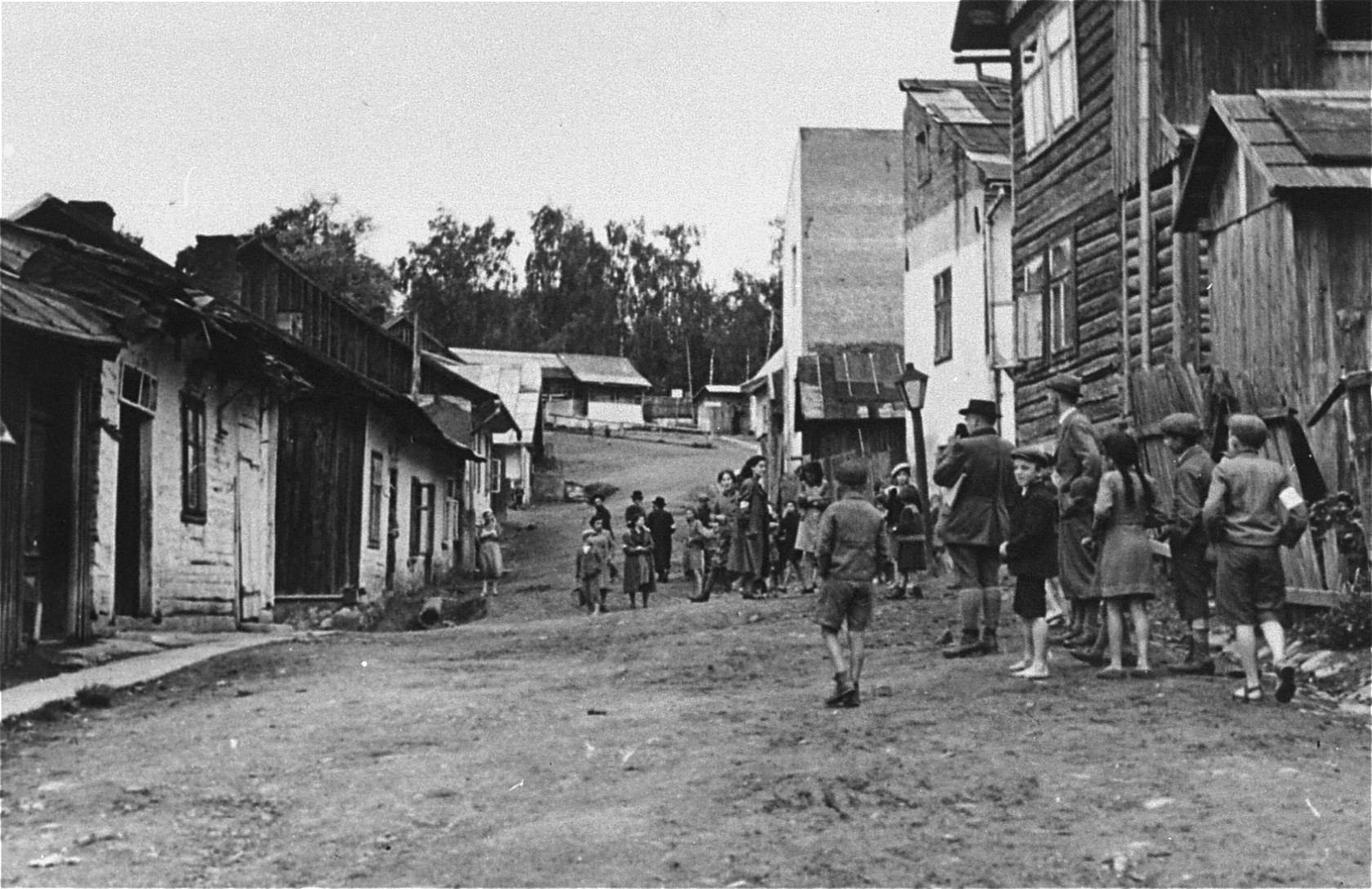
Unpaved street in the Frysztak Ghetto, many children can be seen

Frysztak Ghetto was created in the Polish shtetl of Frysztak during World War II by Nazi Germany and existed until 18 August 1942, when it was liquidated.

== History ==
At the outbreak of World War II the population of Frysztak was three quarters Jewish with 1,322 people. Major forms of commerce in Frysztak at this time included crafts and farming. The German occupation of the town began on September 8, 1939, when German soldiers robbed Jewish homes and shops and forcibly conscripted Jews. One week after the occupation of Frysztak began, on Rosh Hashanah, German soldiers set fire to several holy objects and murdered Jewish worshipers in the synagogue. By November 1939, the Germans had incorporated Frysztak into the Generalgouvernment by merging the town with Kreis (sub-district) Jaslo, which was located within Kraków District.

From 1940 to 1943, SS-Hauptsturmführer Dr. Wilhem Raschwitz coordinated the anti-Jewish actions that were in Kreis Jaslo. Under Raschwitz authority was the Grenzpolizeikommissariat (GPK) who were in charge of a unit of German Gendarmerie stationed within Frysztak. The German Gendarmerie were in charge of the Polish police. In 1939, the Germans created a Judenrat consisting of Jewish elders, which they placed under the regional Judenrat of Kreis Jaslo on April 29, 1940. The Frysztak Judenrat was in charge of its own unit of Jewish police and charged with recruiting Jews between the ages of 15 and 60 for forced labor. In 1940, the Fyrsztak Judenrat was also tasked with the management of refugees from Lodz, Slask, Kraków and surrounding villages. Lastly, it was responsible for distributing food. Deteriorating conditions caused the Judenrat to call upon the Jewish Social Self-Help (JSS) organization to support Frysztaks people who were dangerously close to starvation in 1940. At this time, 283 Jews received material aid while 1,440 received financial assistance. On June 7, 1941, the JSS set up a branch in Frysztak to not only help Frysztak Jews but extend their support to Jewish communities in Wisniowa and Odrzykon. Ultimately the JSS were only able to provide aid for 325 of the 400 Frysztak Jews that had applied.

Although there was a labor camp located within Frysztak, its population of 2000 were primarily deported from Warsaw. Rather than keep them nearby, the Germans sent Frysztak Jews to four labor camps that surrounded the town. Housed within two synagogues, Jews in the Frysztak camp were forced to do road construction, build a railroad from the village of Wisnica to Stepina, and work on stone quarries located near Czeiswinia. They would sometimes have to walk up to 10 kilometers within a day to reach their job site. A Jewish internal police unit watched over the Frysztak camp, which operated from July 1941 until November of the same year when poor living conditions lead to the typhus outbreak which caused it to close. Germans sent the surviving Jews back to the Warsaw area. Before Germans established the Frysztak ghetto in January 1942, Jews were prohibited from leaving due to fear of spreading disease. This law persisted and became more severe with the Germans threatening death as a consequence for leaving. The ghetto continued to receive refugees from surrounding villages until Germans liquidated the ghetto. Since Jews were unable to leave Frysztak, JSS established a food kitchen, which provided 300 dinners a day, in an attempt to relieve some of the demand for food. Despite their efforts many still went hungry. Other ways in which the JSS attempted to aid Frysztak Jews was to reestablish the town as clothing production center to prevent deportation but unfortunately deportation proceeded when the Kreishauptmann shut done JSS plans for an agricultural training. The first round of deportation consisted of 800 Jews, including men over the age of 52 and women with more than two children, and came after Jews were told to meet in the market by the Frysztak Judenrat.

The fate of the first Jews to be deported from Frysztak was that of mass murder in the Warzyce Forest. The Germans shot the 800 people into three graves. Those who had not been killed right away were buried alive. The ghetto was liquidated on August 18 the same year, with the remaining Jews taken to Jasło ghetto. These were sent a few days later to the Belzec extermination camp.
