= Gmina Strawczyn =

Gmina Strawczyn Strawczyn Commune
- Gmina
- Coat of arms
- Interactive map of Gmina Strawczyn
- Coordinates (Strawczyn): 50°56′31″N 20°25′12″E
- Country: Poland
- Voivodeship: Świętokrzyskie
- County: Kielce County
- Seat: Strawczyn

Area
  - Total: 86.26 km^{2} (33.31 sq mi)

Population (2006)
  - Total: 9,789
  - Density: 113.5/km^{2} (293.9/sq mi)
- Website: http://www.strawczyn.pl

Gmina Strawczyn is a rural gmina (administrative district) in Kielce County, Świętokrzyskie Voivodeship, in south-central Poland. Its seat is the village of Strawczyn, which lies approximately 16 kilometres (10 mi) north-west of the regional capital Kielce.

The gmina covers an area of 86.26 square kilometres (33.3 sq mi), and as of 2006 its total population is 11,275.

The gmina contains part of the protected area called Suchedniów-Oblęgorek Landscape Park.

== Villages ==
Gmina Strawczyn contains the villages and settlements of Bugaj, Chełmce, Hucisko, Korczyn, Kuźniaki, Małogoskie, Niedźwiedź, Oblęgór, Oblęgorek, Promnik, Ruda Strawczyńska, Strawczyn and Strawczynek.

== Neighbouring gminas ==
Gmina Strawczyn is bordered by the gminas of Łopuszno, Miedziana Góra, Mniów and Piekoszów.
