= Promnik, Świętokrzyskie Voivodeship =

Promnik
- Village
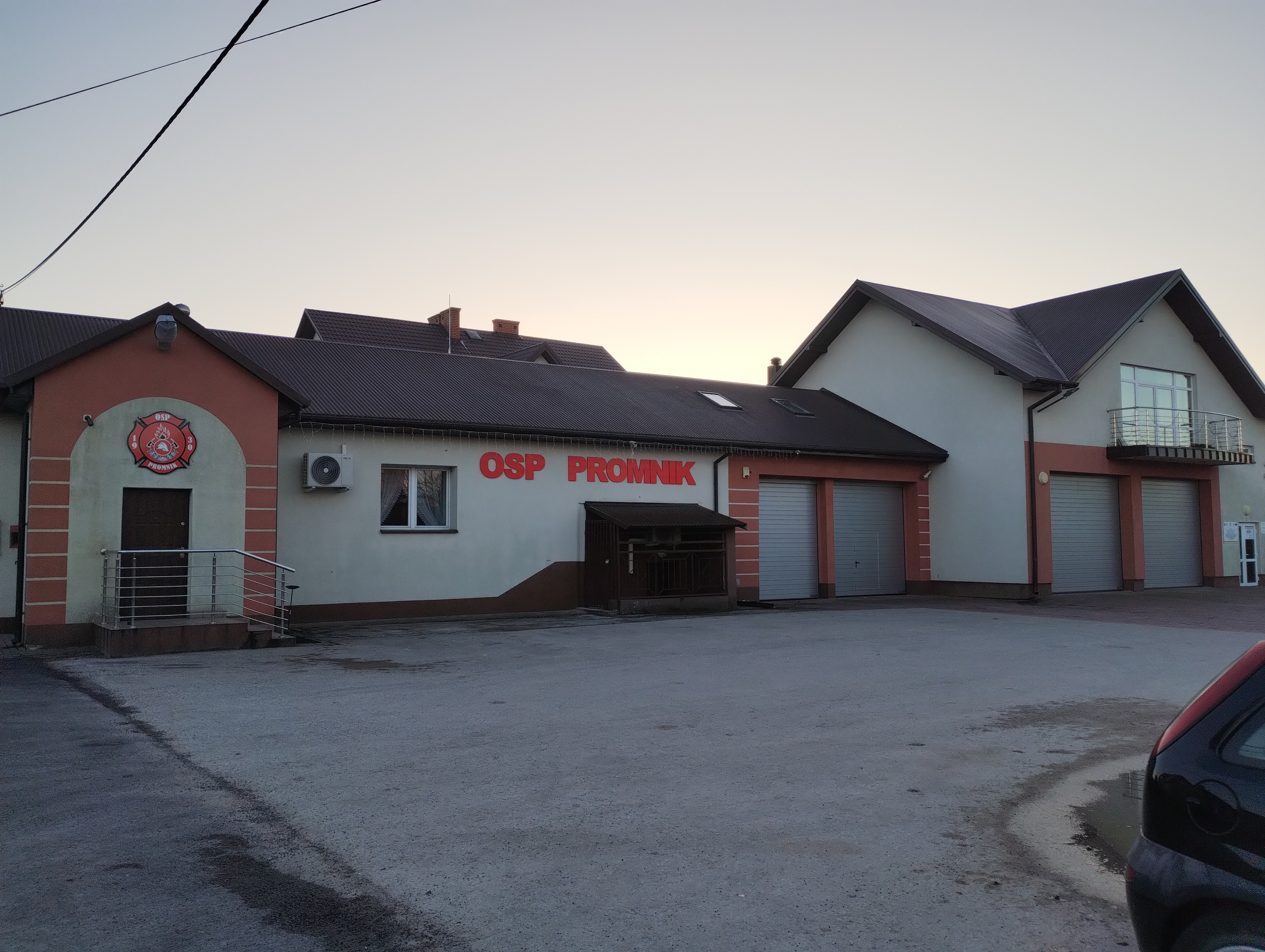
- Voluntary Fire Brigade in Promnik

- Location within Poland
- Coordinates: 50°55′19″N 20°25′28″E
- Country: Poland
- Voivodeship: Świętokrzyskie
- County: Kielce
- Gmina: Strawczyn
- Population: 1,500

Promnik [ˈprɔmnik] is a village in the administrative district of Gmina Strawczyn, within Kielce County, Świętokrzyskie Voivodeship, in south-central Poland. It lies approximately 3 km (2 mi) south of Strawczyn and 15 km (9 mi) west of the regional capital Kielce.
