= Chełmce, Świętokrzyskie Voivodeship =

Chełmce
- Village
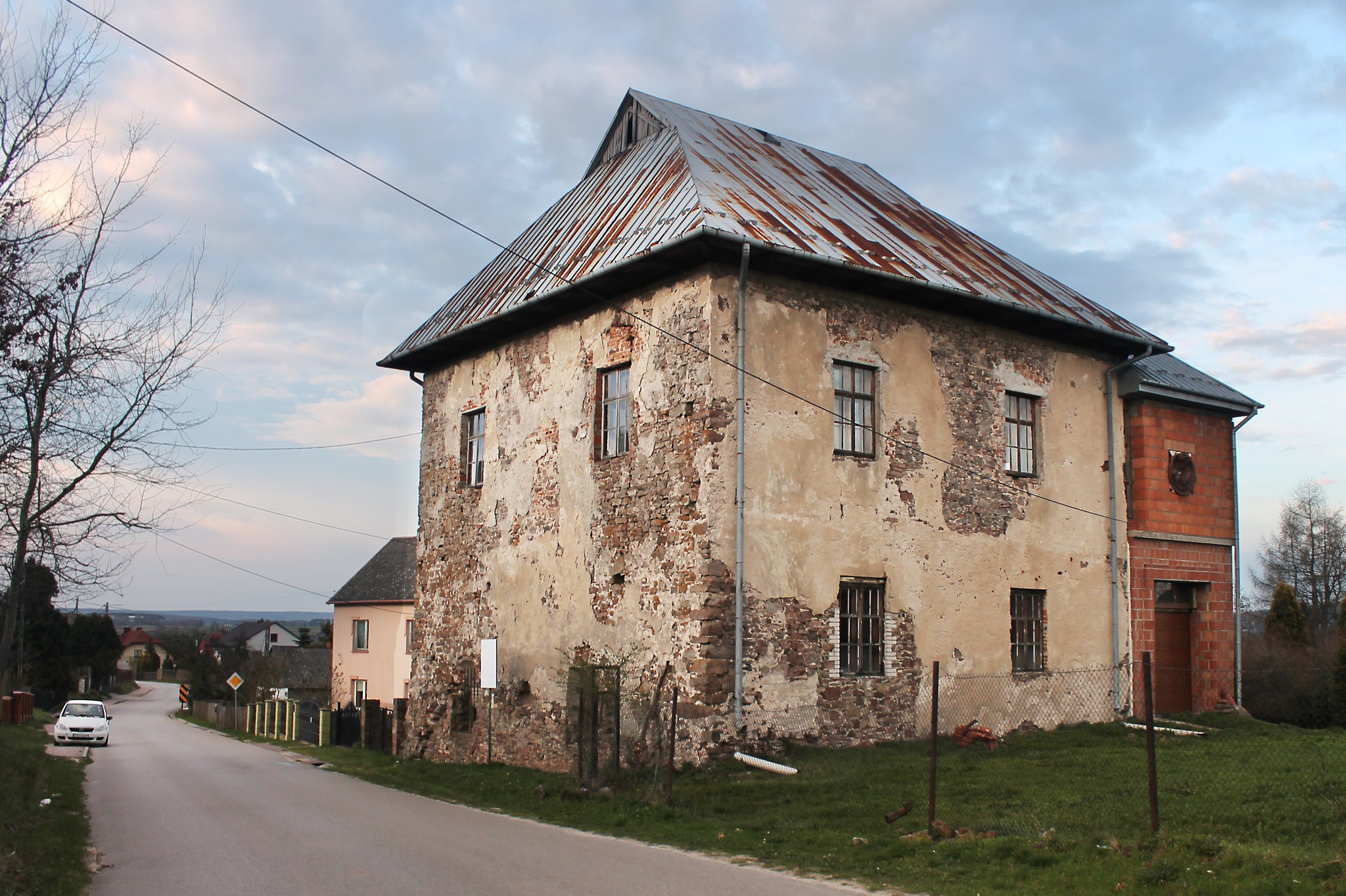

- Location within Poland
- Coordinates: 50°55′56″N 20°29′29″E
- Country: Poland
- Voivodeship: Świętokrzyskie
- County: Kielce
- Gmina: Strawczyn
- Population: 1,000

Chełmce [ˈxɛu̯mt͡sɛ] is a village in the administrative district of Gmina Strawczyn, within Kielce County, Świętokrzyskie Voivodeship, in south-central Poland. It lies approximately 6 km (4 mi) east of Strawczyn and 11 km (7 mi) north-west of the regional capital Kielce.
