= Korczyn =

- Village
- Location within Poland
- Coordinates: 50°55′40″N 20°20′2″E
- Country: Poland
- Voivodeship: Świętokrzyskie
- County: Kielce
- Gmina: Strawczyn

Population
  - Total: 880

Korczyn [ˈkɔrt͡ʂɨn] is a village in the administrative district of Gmina Strawczyn, within Kielce County, Świętokrzyskie Voivodeship, in south-central Poland. It lies approximately 7 km (4 mi) west of Strawczyn and 21 km (13 mi) west of the regional capital Kielce.
