= Warzyce =

- Village
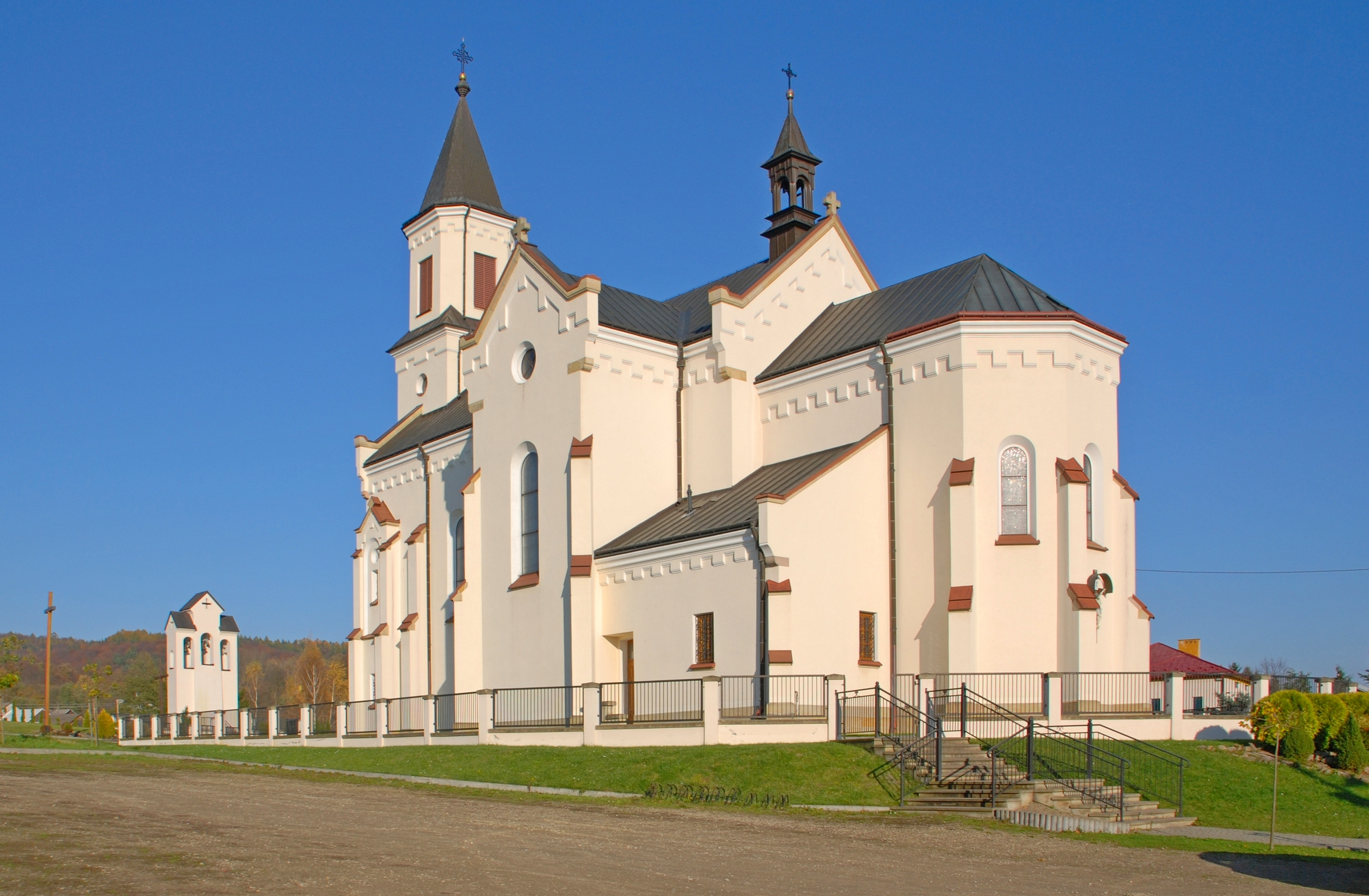
- Local church

- Location within Poland
- Coordinates: 49°46′N 21°33′E
- Country: Poland
- Voivodeship: Subcarpathian
- County: Jasło
- Gmina: Jasło

Warzyce [vaˈʐɨt͡sɛ] is a village in the administrative district of Gmina Jasło, within Jasło County, Subcarpathian Voivodeship, in south-eastern Poland.

== History ==
In 1938, there were 2636 Jews living in Jasło. During World War II, the Warzyce forest became a place of martyrdom of about 5000 Poles, Jews and Russians who were murdered there by the Nazis in many mass executions. The majority of Jewish victims were Jews from ghettos in Frysztak, Jasło, Tarnów, Nowy Zmigrod and Korczyn. One of the biggest mass shootings took place on the 3rd of August, 1942. That day, the Nazis shot in that forest about 690 Jews who were next buried in huge pits. After the war, the place of martyrdom became a cemetery with 32 mass graves.

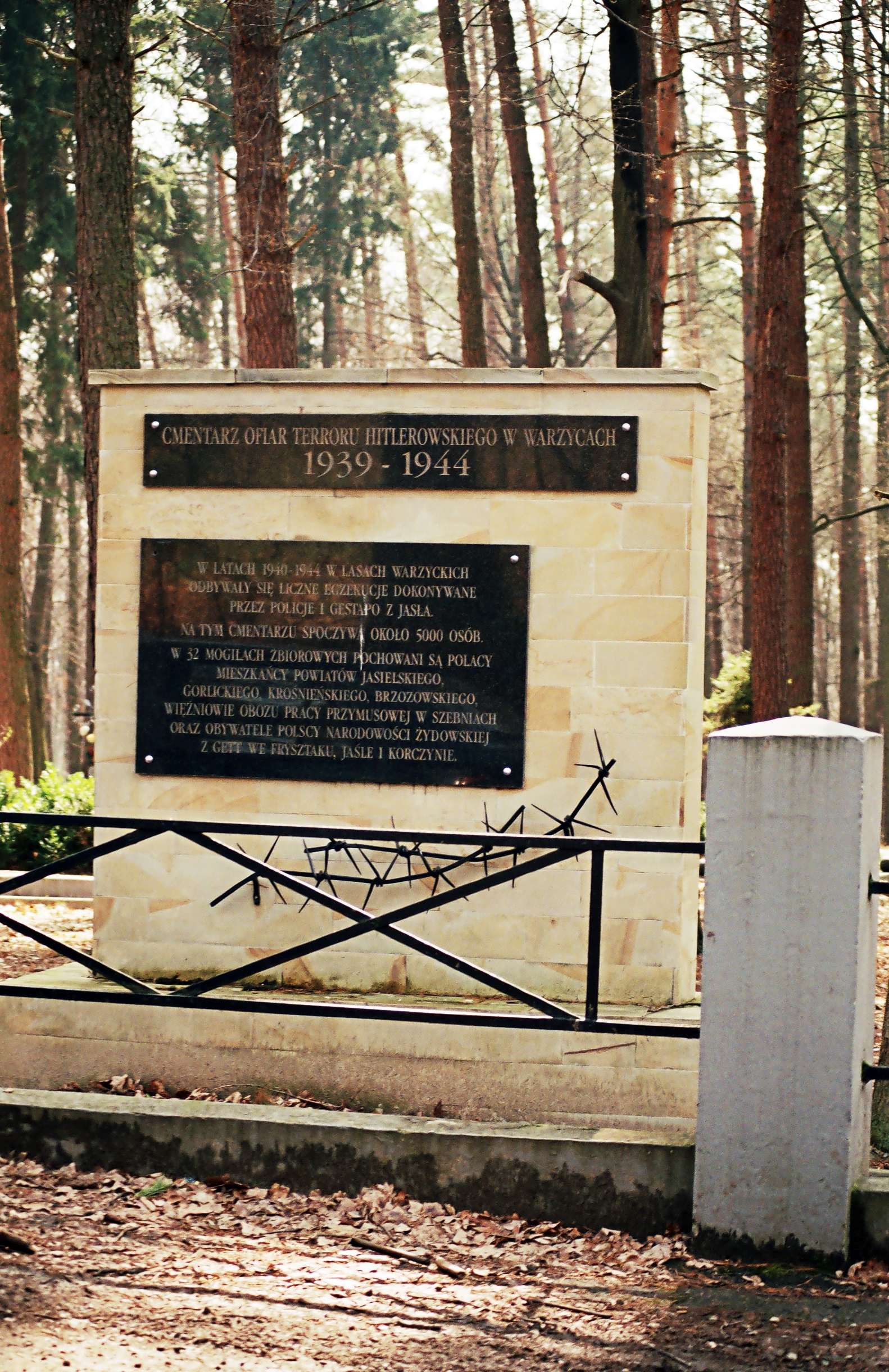
Memorial in Warzyce
