= Strawczyn =

- Village
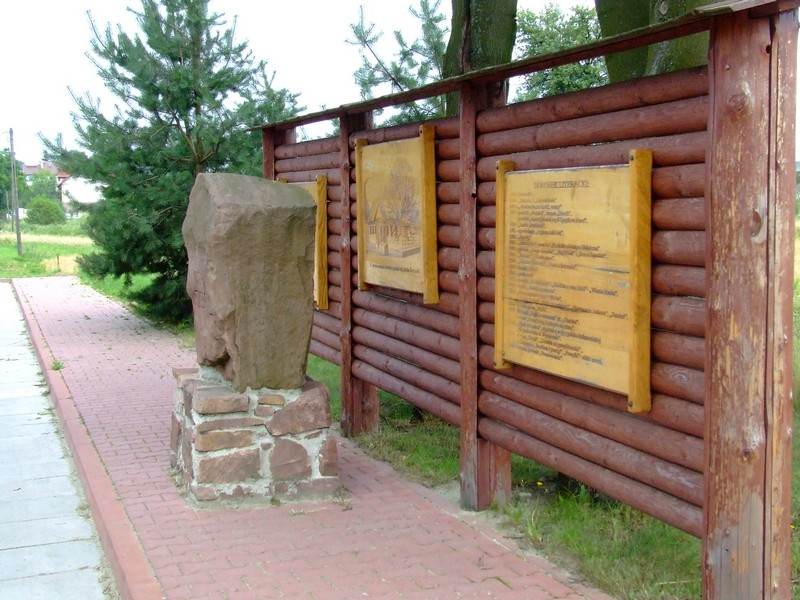
- Monument in the place where the house, where Stefan Żeromski was born, was located

- Coat of arms

- Location within Poland
- Coordinates: 50°56′31″N 20°25′12″E
- Country: Poland
- Voivodeship: Świętokrzyskie
- County: Kielce
- Gmina: Strawczyn
- Population: 1,000

Strawczyn [ˈstraft͡ʂɨn] is a village in Kielce County, Świętokrzyskie Voivodeship, in south-central Poland. It is the seat of the gmina (administrative district) called Gmina Strawczyn. It lies approximately 16 km (10 mi) north-west of the regional capital Kielce.

Polish writer Stefan Żeromski was born here.
