= Sonderdienst =

Nazi Military unit

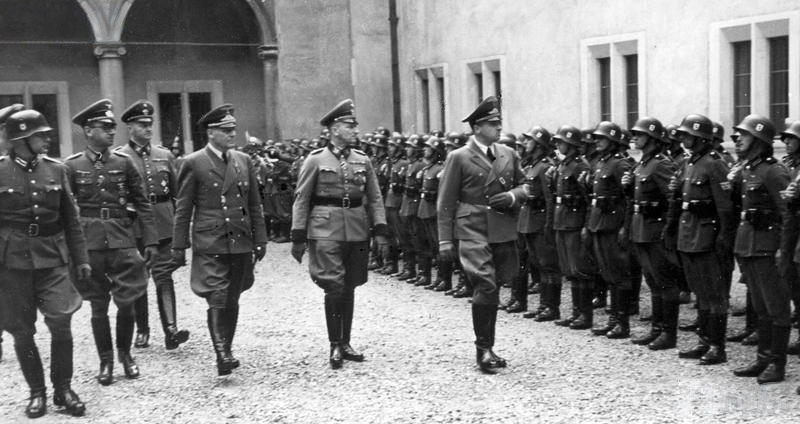
- Leaders of General Government during inspection of Sonderdienst battalions: from right, Generalgouverneur Hans Frank, Higher SS and Police Leader Herbert Becker and Secretary of State Ernst Boepple
- Active: 6 May 1940 — 1945
- Country: Occupied Poland
- Allegiance: Nazi Germany (SS)
- Type: Paramilitary police reserve

Sonderdienst (German for "Special Services") were mostly non-German Nazi paramilitary formations created in the occupied General Government during the occupation of Poland in World War II. They were based on similar SS formations called Volksdeutscher Selbstschutz operating in the Warthegau district of German-annexed western Poland in 1939.

Sonderdienst were founded on 6 May 1940 by Gauleiter Hans Frank who was stationed in occupied Kraków. Initially, they were made up of ethnic German Volksdeutsche who lived in Poland before the attack and joined the invading force thereafter. After Operation Barbarossa began in 1941, they also included Soviet prisoners of war who volunteered for special training, such as the Trawniki men (German: Trawnikimänner) deployed at all major killing sites of the "Final Solution". Many of those men did not know German and required translation by their native commanders. The Abteilung Sonderdienst (Department of Special Services) was subordinate to the Oberkommando der Wehrmacht sabotage division under Erwin von Lahousen (1 September 1939 – July 1943) and Wessel Freytag von Loringhoven (July 1943 – June 1944).

== Background ==
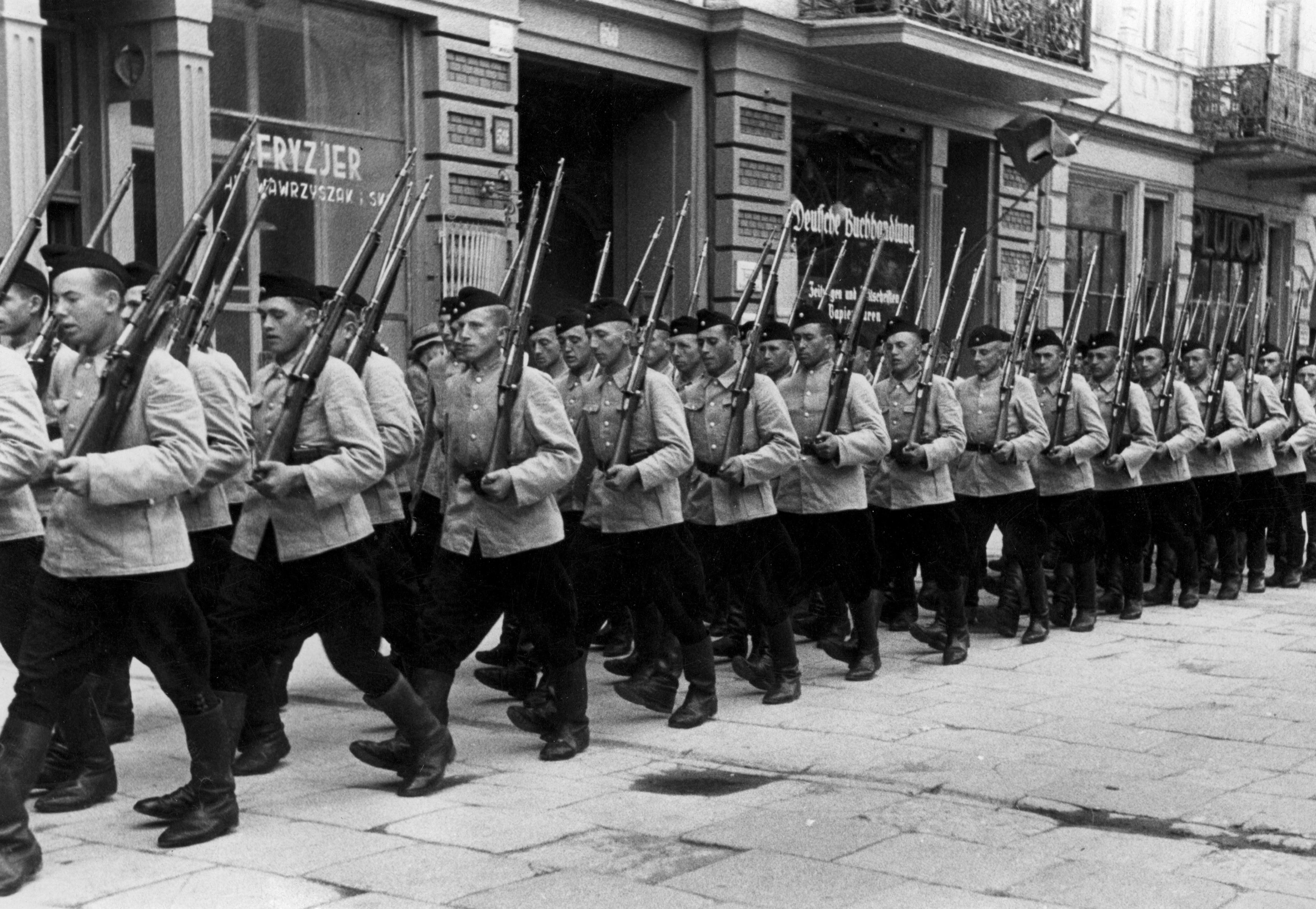
Sonderdienst battalion in occupied Kraków, July 1940

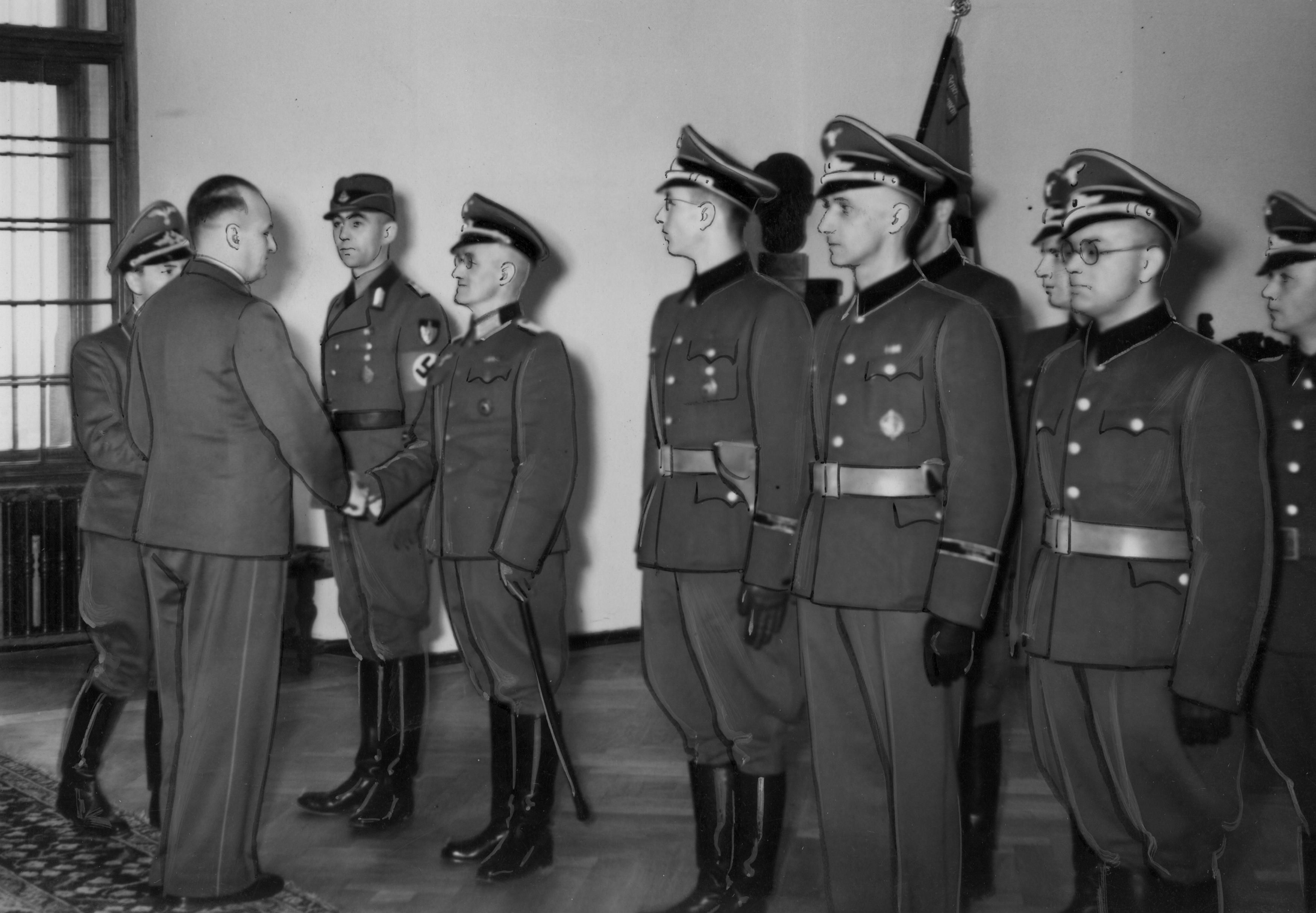
Gauleiter Hans Frank and Sonderdienst leaders in Kraków, 1941

The Republic of Poland was a multi-ethnic country before World War II, with almost a third of its population comprising minority groups: 13.9% Ukrainians; 10% Jews; 3.1% Belarusians; 2.3% Germans and 3.4% Czechs, Lithuanians, and Russians. Members of the German minority resided predominantly in the lands of the former German Empire but not only. Germans in particular were hostile towards the existence of the Polish state after losing their colonial privileges at the end of World War I. German organizations in Poland such as Deutscher Volksverband and the Jungdeutsche Partei actively engaged in espionage for the Abwehr, sabotage actions, weapons-smuggling and Nazi propaganda campaigns before the invasion. In late 1939 through spring of 1940 the German Volksdeutscher Selbstschutz took active part in the massacres of civilian Poles and Jews.

In the summer of 1940, the Sonderdienst along with all Selbstschutz executioners were formally assigned to the head of the civil administration for the newly formed Nazi era Gau. Trained by native Germans under the leadership of Heinrich Himmler's associate Ludolf Jakob von Alvensleben, many of them joined the Schutzstaffel or Gestapo during the following year.

=== Operation Barbarossa ===
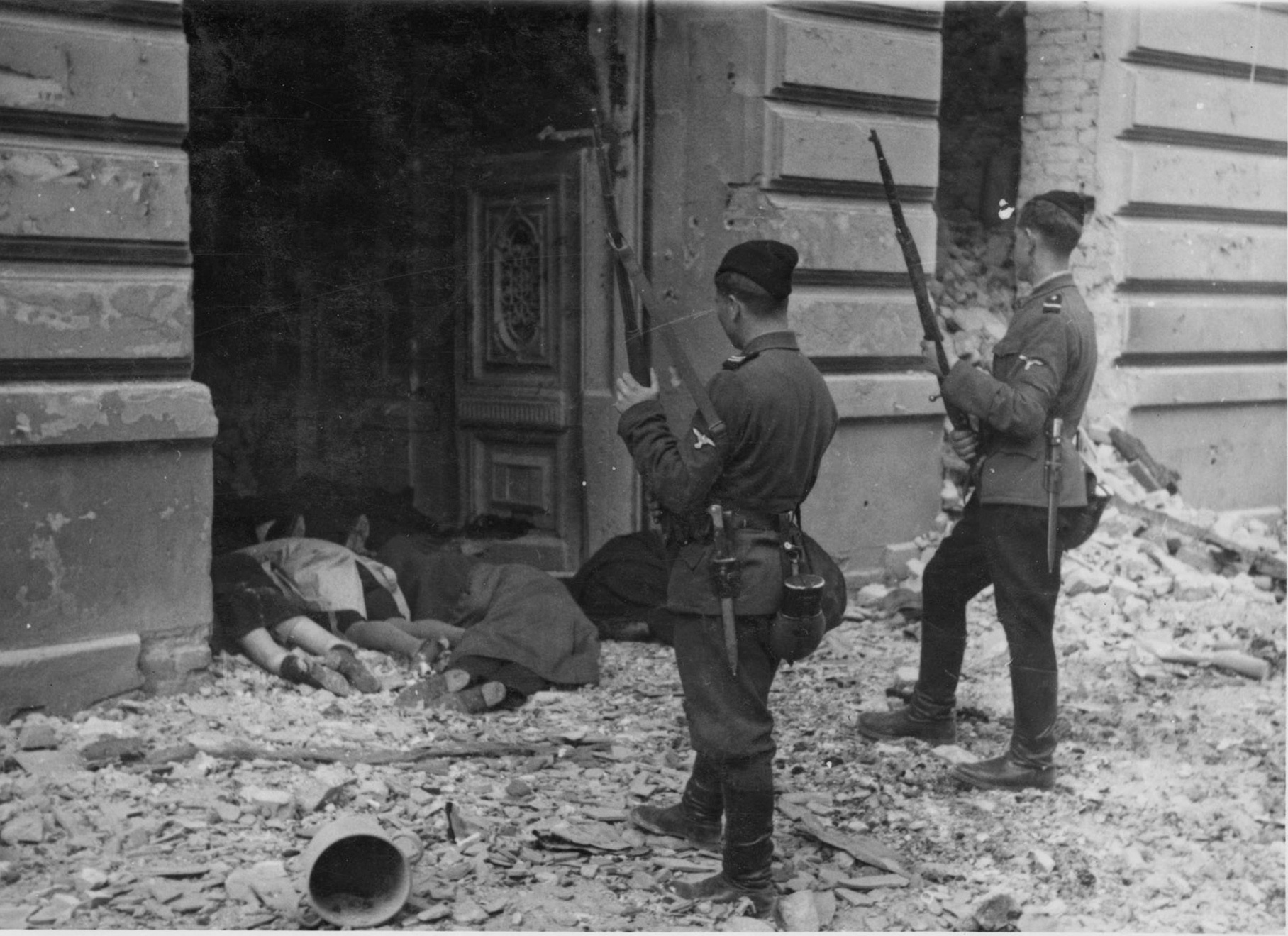
Hiwis from one of two Sonderdienst battalions trained by Karl Streibel at the Trawniki training camp during the firearms artillery subjugation of Warsaw. Photo from Jürgen Stroop Report, 1943

Some 3,000 men served with the Sonderdienst in the General Government. After the Nazi German conquest of eastern Europe, known as Operation Barbarossa, Gruppenführer Globocnik eagerly sought another source of manpower. The citizens of these countries who spoke German became highly valued because of their ability to communicate in Ukrainian, Russian, Polish and other languages of the occupied territories. The training of non-German European auxiliaries was arranged at the Trawniki concentration camp by SS-Hauptsturmführer Karl Streibel. Instructed by Globocnik to start recruiting behind the front lines of Operation Barbarossa, Streibel trained 5,082 mostly Ukrainian guards before the end of 1944. They were organized into two new Sonderdienst battalions. According to the postwar testimony of SS-Oberführer Arpad Wigand during his war crimes trial in Hamburg, only 25 percent of them even spoke German.

=== During Final Solution of Operation Reinhard ===
The Hiwi Wachmänner guards known as "Trawniki men" (Trawnikimänner) served at death camps as well as all major killing sites of the "Final Solution" throughout Operation Reinhard. They took an active role in the executions of Jews at Belzec, Sobibor, Treblinka II, Warsaw (three times), Częstochowa, Lublin, Lwów, Radom, Kraków, Białystok (twice), Majdanek as well as Auschwitz, not to mention Trawniki during Aktion Erntefest of 1943, and the remaining subcamps of KL Lublin.

in including Poniatowa concentration camp, Budzyn, Kraśnik, Puławy, Lipowa 7 camp, as well as during massacres in Łomazy, Międzyrzec, Łuków, Radzyń, Parczew, Końskowola, Komarówka and all other locations, augmented by the SS and the Reserve Police Battalion 101 from Orpo. After the war ended, the last 1,000 Hiwi volunteers forming the SS Battalion Streibel blended in with the civilian population in West Germany and disappeared from sight.
