= Eastern Germany (disambiguation) =

Eastern Germany may refer to:

- New states of Germany, states that joined the Federal Republic of Germany after 1990

Historically:

- Former eastern territories of Germany, territories lost by Germany during and after the two world wars
- East Germany, namely the German Democratic Republic, the socialist state in existence between 1949 and 1990
- Osttruppen (German Eastern Troops), military of the Nazi Germany,
