= Dortan massacre =

Massacre during World War II

- Part of World War II
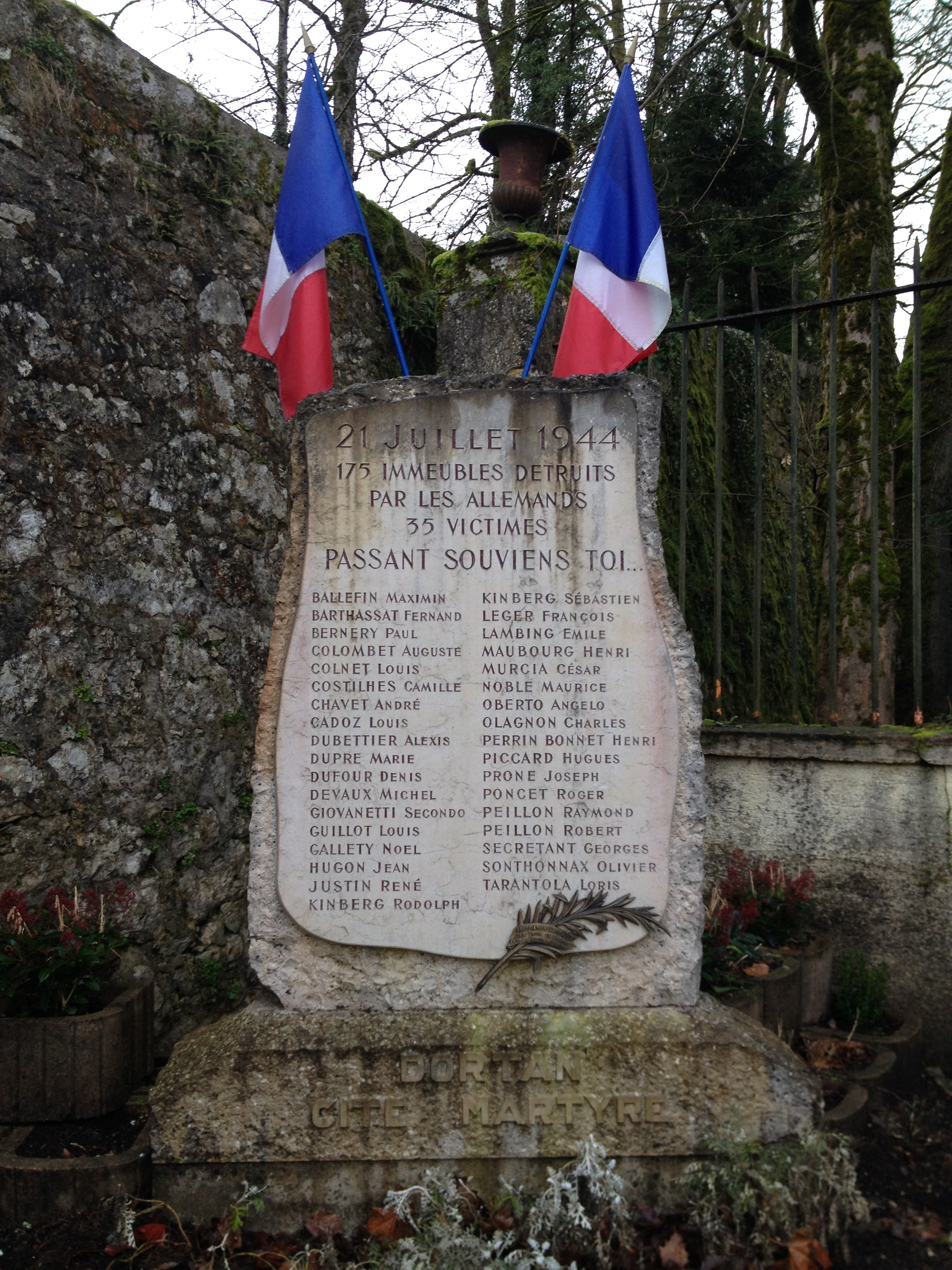
- Commemorative plaque to the victims
- Location: 46°19′06″N 05°39′35″E; Dortan, France
- Date: 12–21 July 1944
- Attack type: Mass shooting, war crime
- Deaths: 35–36 killed (Note: The death toll of the massacre varies between 35 and 36 victims, depending on the source.)
- Victim: French civilians
- Perpetrators: German military, Freiwilligen-Stamm-Division

The Dortan massacre was a massacre in which approximately 35 French civilians were killed by Wehrmacht volunteers in the village of Dortan, Ain during World War II. It was perpetrated by Volunteer Cossack-Stamm-Regiment 5, part of the Freiwilligen-Stamm-Division, in 12–21 July 1944 during Operation Treffenfeld. It was part of a wider German anti-partisan offensive against the French Maquis de l'Ain et du Haut-Jura, which staged a massive uprising in mid-1944 along with other French resistance groups.

== Background ==
Resistance activity in German-occupied France increased significantly in 1944 after the Allied landings in Normandy. Various Maquis units staged uprisings throughout France, capturing villages and fighting the German occupiers. German units feared the imminent Allied landing in Southern France and ramped up anti-partisan operations to recapture and control the French countryside. One of the planned offensives was Operation Treffenfeld, a large-scale offensive aimed at destroying the French resistance of the Maquis de l'Ain et du Haut-Jura. This group had been active in the Ain department for years and had its stronghold around the city of Oyonnax. They conducted widespread sabotage actions against the German infrastructure in the region, and German efforts had been mostly unsuccessful at nullifying the threat.

== Massacre ==
The German offensive against the French Maquis was mostly successful and they advanced through the Jura Mountains with great speed. The Germans proceeded with utmost brutality; French civilians were frequently accused of being partisan sympathizers and executed on the spot. The village of Dortan is just a few kilometers from Oyonnax.

On 12 July the Volunteer Cossack-Stamm-Regiment 5 of the Freiwilligen-Stamm-Division, an Ostlegion unit of volunteers from occupied USSR territory fighting for the Wehrmacht, approached the village. After arrival, the village was declared a "bandit center" (Banditenzentrum) and widespread looting commenced. Seven people, including the local priest, were shot immediately. The next day, killings continued in what the Germans described as "reprisal actions". The local women were systematically raped, and two of them murdered afterwards. 24 civilians were killed the first two days.

The Wehrmacht established a local headquarters in the town to coordinate their operations in the nearby countryside. On 20 July, sixteen men from the nearby Château de Dortan were arrested and tortured. The next day, the Germans proceeded to burn the entire village down to the ground. More people were executed, bringing the final death toll to about 35. The Germans left the town in ruins.

== Aftermath ==
The village was rebuilt after the war and a street was named as a memorial of the events of the 21 July. A monument has been erected to honour the victims of the killings. Several plaques and other memorials remind of the massacre.

== Bibliography ==
- Farmer, Sarah (1999). Martyred Village: Commemorating the 1944 Massacre at Oradour-sur-Glane. University of California Press. ISBN 9780520211865.
- Kedward, Harry Roderick (1993). In Search of the Maquis : Rural Resistance in Southern France 1942-1944. Clarendon Press. ISBN 9780191591785.
- Lieb, Peter (2007). Konventioneller Krieg oder NS-Weltanschauungskrieg. Kriegführung und Partisanenbekämpfung in Frankreich 1943/44 [Conventional or NS-ideological war. Warfare and anti-partisan fighting in France 1943/44] (in German). R. Oldenbourg Verlag. ISBN 978-3486579925.
- Wette, Wolfram; Ueberschär, Gerd R. (2001). Kriegsverbrechen im 20. Jahrhundert [War crimes in the 20th Century] (in German). Wissenschaftliche Buchgesellschaft. ISBN 9783896784179.
