= Trawniki =

- Village
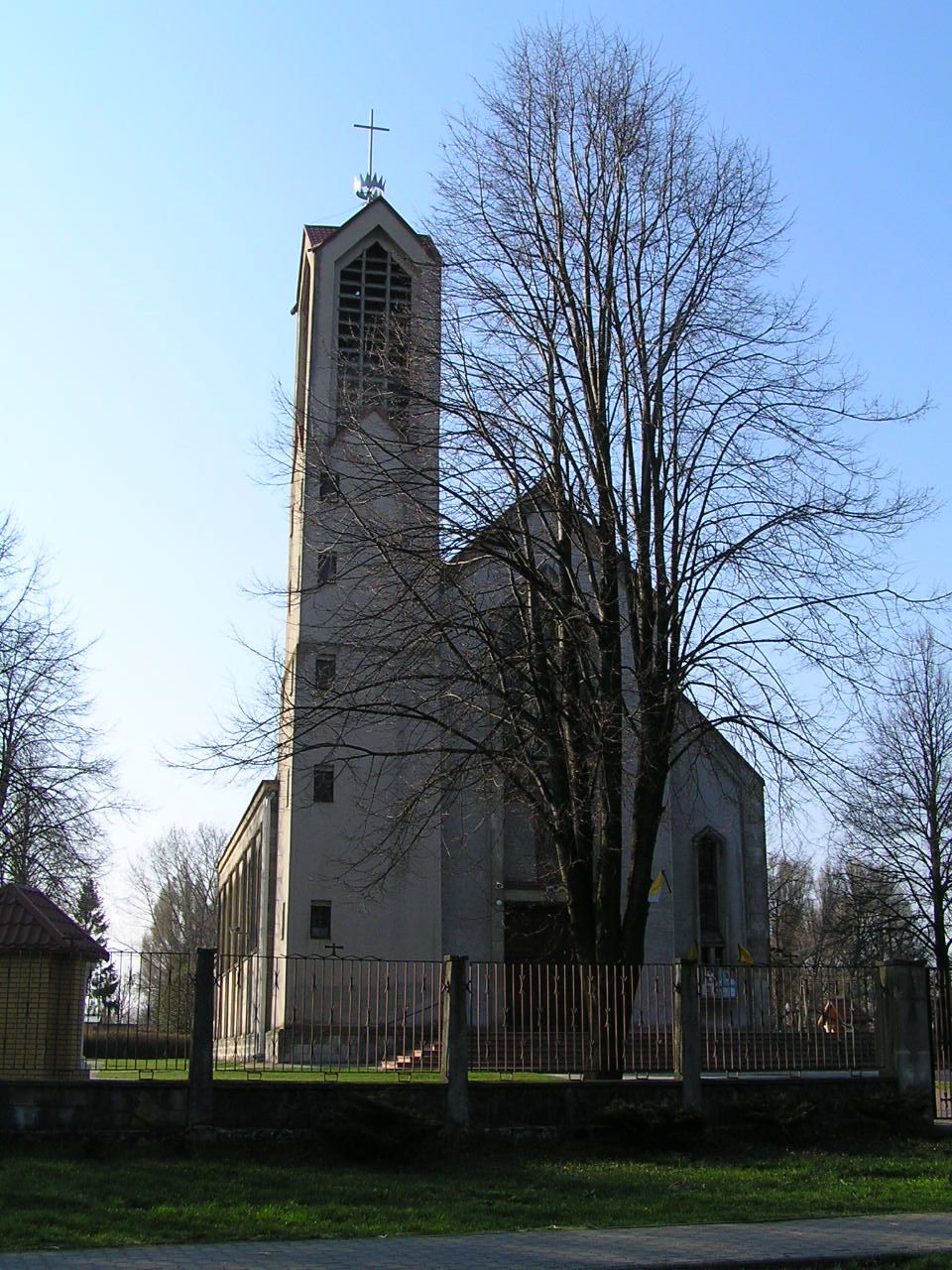
- Parish church

- Location within Poland
- Coordinates: 51°7′55″N 23°0′9″E
- Country: Poland
- Voivodeship: Lublin
- County: Świdnik
- Gmina: Trawniki

Population
  - Total: 2,893
- Time zone: UTC+1 (CET)
  - Summer (DST): UTC+2 (CEST)
- Vehicle registration: LSW

Trawniki [travˈniki] is a village in Świdnik County, Lublin Voivodeship, in eastern Poland. It is the seat of the gmina (administrative district) called Gmina Trawniki.

== History ==
The village was mentioned as Trawnik in a chronicle by Jan Długosz. It was administratively located in the Lublin Voivodeship in the Lesser Poland Province of the Kingdom of Poland.

During the Third Partition of Poland in 1795, Trawniki was annexed by Austria. After the Polish victory in the Austro-Polish War of 1809 it was regained by Poles and included within the short-lived Polish Duchy of Warsaw. Following the duchy's dissolution in 1815, it was part of the Russian-controlled Congress Poland, since 1837 administratively located in the Lublin Governorate. In 1827, it had a population of 240. The Russian government planned to use its train station to transport Russian troops to fight Austria-Hungary during World War I. After World War I, Poland regained independence and control of the village.

=== World War II ===
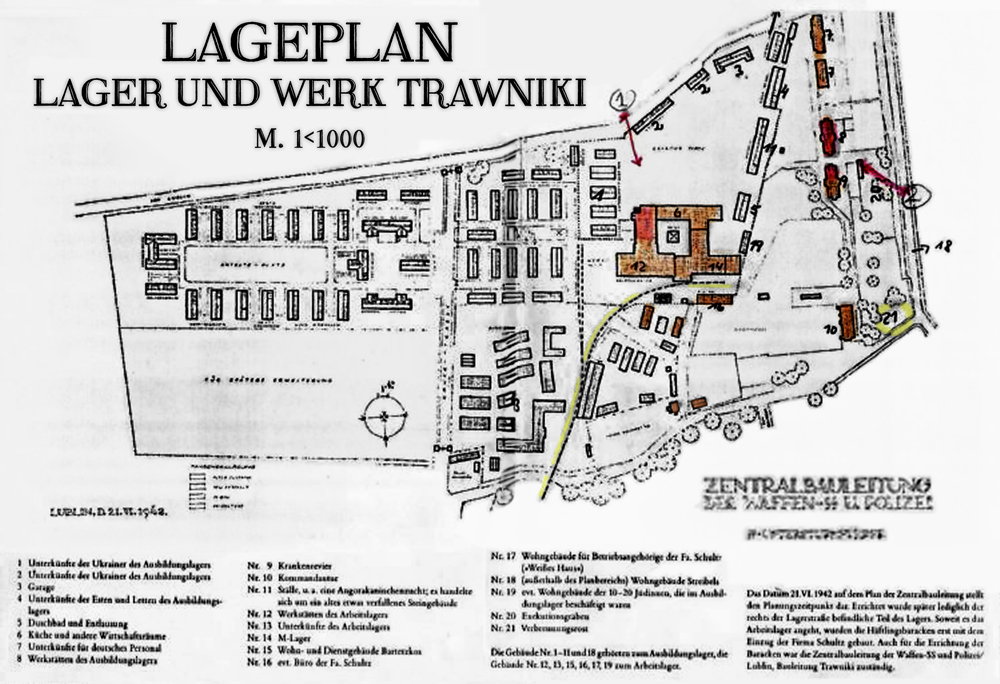
Original German site plan of the Trawniki concentration camp, 1942

During World War II and the German occupation of Poland, Trawniki was the location of the Trawniki concentration camp. This camp provided slave labourers for nearby industrial plants of the SS Ostindustrie. They worked in appalling conditions with little food, and many died of disease, malnutrition and ill treatment.

From September 1941 until July 1944, the camp was also used for training guards recruited from Soviet POWs, who were known as "Hiwi" (German letterword for 'Hilfswillige', lit. "those willing to help"), for service with Auxiliary police in occupied Poland.

In addition to serving as guards at concentration and death camps, the Trawniki men (German: Trawnikimänner) took part in Operation Reinhard, the Nazi extermination of Polish Jews. They conducted executions at extermination camps and in Jewish ghettos, including at Belzec, Sobibor, Treblinka II, Warsaw (three times, see Stroop Report), Częstochowa, Lublin, Lwów, Radom, Kraków, Białystok (twice), Majdanek as well as Auschwitz, and Trawniki itself.
