= Freiwilligen-Stamm-Division =

- Active: 1 February 1944 - 8 May 1945
- Country: Nazi Germany
- Branch: Army
- Type: Infantry
- Size: Division
- Engagements: World War II

The Freiwilligen-Stamm-Division (transl. Volunteer Depot Division) was a Wehrmacht infantry division during World War II. It was created on 1 February 1944 in Southern France. The Division was a so-called Ostlegion, which means its personnel was made up from volunteers from the Soviet Union. Specifically Freiwilligen-Stamm-Division consisted of Turkic, Azerbaijani, Georgian, Tartar, Cossack, Armenian, Iranian and other Soviet volunteers, spread over five regiments. The primary purpose of the division were anti-partisan operations against the French Resistance.

In 1944, the French Maquis started numerous uprisings in France. To defeat the French forces, units of the Freiwilligen-Stamm-Division were used in various operations. This included German operations against the maquis of Mont Mouchet, l'Ain and Haut-Jura and Vercors.

Part of these anti-Maquis operations also included Operation Treffenfeld, in which units of the Freiwilligen-Stamm-Division participated. During the operation, the 5th Cossack Regiment of the division conducted the Dortan Massacre at the French town of Dortan on 13/14 July 1944. Twenty-four civilians were killed in what the German command described as "reprisal measures". Days later on 21 July more civilians were executed, bringing the death toll to about 35 people. The village was then burned down and left to ruins.

== Commanding officers ==
- Generalleutnant Ralph von Heygendorff, 1 February 1944 – 11 March 1944
- Generalmajor Wilhelm von Henning, 11 March 1944 – 12 September 1944
- Generalmajor Bodo von Wartenberg, 12 September 1944 – May 1945

== Bibliography ==
- Kedward, Harry Roderick (1993). In Search of the Maquis : Rural Resistance in Southern France 1942-1944. Clarendon Press. ISBN 9780191591785.
- Lieb, Peter (2007). Konventioneller Krieg oder NS-Weltanschauungskrieg. Kriegführung und Partisanenbekämpfung in Frankreich 1943/44 [Conventional or NS-ideological war. Warfare and anti-partisan fighting in France 1943/44] (in German). R. Oldenbourg Verlag. ISBN 978-3486579925.
- Lieb, Peter (2012). Vercors 1944: Resistance in the French Alps. Osprey Publishing. ISBN 978-1849086981.
- Thomas, Nigel (2000). The German Army 1939-45 (5): Western Front 1943-45: Western Front, 1944-45 v. 5 (Men-at-Arms). Osprey Publishing. ISBN 978-1855327979.
