= Trawniki concentration camp =

Nazi concentration camp in Poland (1941–1943)

Coordinates: 51°08′21″N 22°59′35″E

- Forced labour (left) and the SS training camp
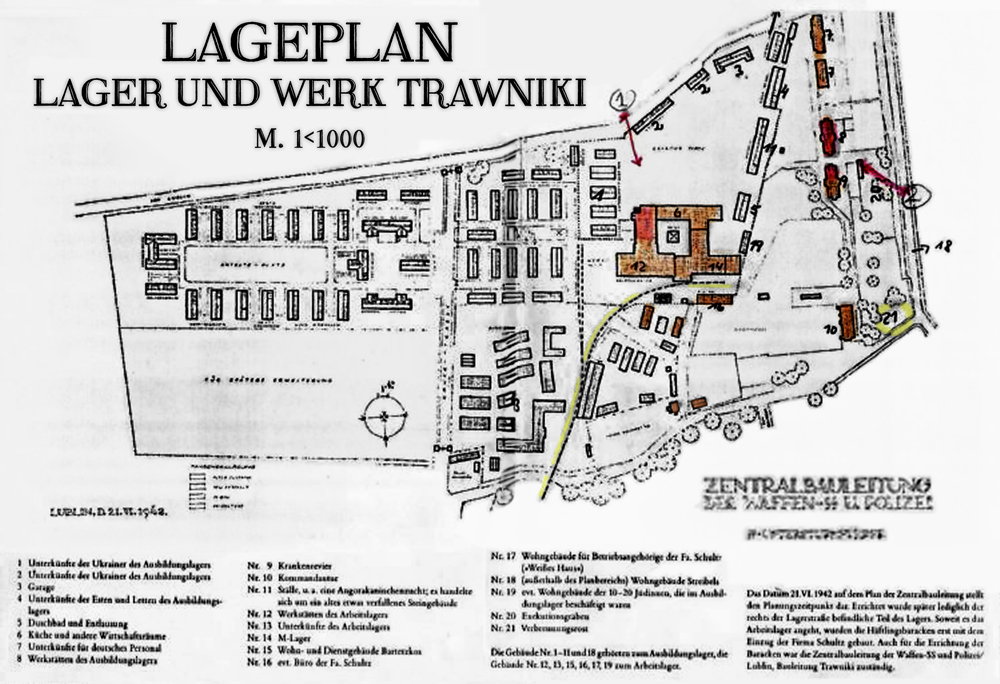
- Original German site plan of the Trawniki camp (as of June 21, 1942). Left: Slave labor camp for condemned Jewish prisoners. Centre: Supply road with two gates, north and south. Right: Training compound for the Hiwi shooters around the military training plaza (handwritten ① with red arrow). north of the former sugar refinery with kitchen (hand-coloured in brown). German SS quarters with infirmary and storeroom (hand-coloured in red). Commandant's house ([lower down]). From the original German legend: 1 & 2. Unterkünfte der Ukrainer des Ausbildungslagers "Accommodations for the Ukrainians at the training camp" 3. Garage [Squad deployment vehicles]: 4. Unterkünfte der Esten und Letten des Ausbildungslagers; "Accommodations for the Estonians and Latvians at the training camp" 11. Ställe in Steingebäuden "Stables in stone building" [Livestock for Hiwi food supply] Location of Trawniki on the map of the Holocaust in German-occupied Poland
- Operated by: SS-Totenkopfverbände
- Commandant: Hermann Höfle, Karl Streibel
- Original use: POW camp for 1941 Operation Barbarossa
- Operational: 1941 – November 1943
- Killed: At least 12,000 Jews at the labour camp (left)

The Trawniki was a concentration camp set up by Nazi Germany in the village of Trawniki about 40 kilometres (25 mi) southeast of Lublin during the occupation of Poland in World War II. Throughout its existence the camp served a dual function. It was organized on the grounds of the former Polish sugar refinery of the Central Industrial Region, and subdivided into at least three distinct zones.

The Trawniki camp first opened after the outbreak of war with the Soviet Union, intended to hold Soviet POWs, with rail lines in all major directions in the General Government territory. Between 1941 and 1944, the camp expanded into an SS training camp for collaborationist auxiliary police, mainly Ukrainian. In 1942, it became the forced-labor camp for thousands of Jews within the Majdanek concentration camp system as well. The Jewish inmates of Trawniki provided slave labour for the makeshift industrial plants of SS-Ostindustrie, working in appalling conditions with little food.

There were 12,000 Jews imprisoned at Trawniki as of 1943 sorting through trainsets of clothing delivered from Holocaust locations. They were all massacred during Operation Harvest Festival of November 3, 1943, by the auxiliary units of Trawniki men stationed at the same location, helped by the travelling Reserve Police Battalion 101 from Orpo. The first camp commandant was Hermann Hoefle, replaced by Karl Streibel.

== Concentration camp operation ==
The Nazi camp at Trawniki was first established in July 1941 to hold prisoners of war captured in Operation Barbarossa, the German invasion of the Soviet Union. The new barracks behind the barbed-wire fence were erected by the prisoners themselves. In 1942 the camp was enlarged to include the SS-Arbeitslager meant for the Polish Jews from across General Government. Within a year, under the management of Gauleiter Odilo Globocnik, the camp included a number of forced labour workshops such as the fur processing plant (Pelzverarbeitungswerk), the brush factory (Bürstenfabrik), the bristles finishing (Borstenzurichterei), and the new branch of Das Torfwerk in Dorohucza.

The Jews who worked there from June 1942 to May 1944 as slave labour for the German war effort were brought in from the Warsaw Ghetto as well as selected transit ghettos across Europe (Germany, Austria, Slovakia) under Operation Reinhard, and from September 1943 as part of the Majdanek concentration camp system of subcamps such as the Poniatowa concentration camp and several others.

== Trawniki training camp ==
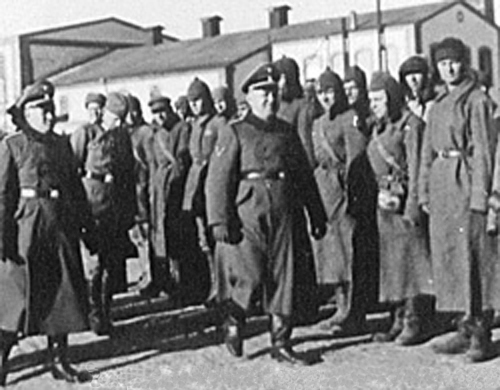
Company of Hiwis at the camp training plaza (some still wearing their Soviet Budenovkas), inspected by Karl Streibel (centre)

From September 1941 until July 1944, the facility served as the full-fledged training base with dining rooms and sleeping quarters for the new Schutzmannschaften recruited from POW camps for service with Nazi Germany in the General Government territory. Karl Streibel, the camp commander, and his officers used to induce Ukrainian, Latvian and Lithuanian men already familiar with firearms to take the initiative of their own free will. The total of 5,082 men were prepared at Trawniki for duty in German Sonderdienst battalions before the end of 1944 – across from the forlorn Jewish camp separated by an inner fence.

Although the majority of Trawniki men (or Hiwis) came from among the willing prisoners of war of Ukrainian ethnicity, there were also Volksdeutsche from Eastern Europe among them, valued because of their ability to speak Ukrainian, Russian, Polish and other languages of the occupied territories. They became the only squad commanders. Trawniki men took major part in Operation Reinhard, the Nazi plan to exterminate Polish and foreign Jews. They served at extermination camps, and played an important role in the annihilation of the Warsaw Ghetto Uprising (see the Stroop Report) and the Białystok Ghetto Uprising among other ghetto insurgencies.

== Camp liquidation, November 3, 1943 ==
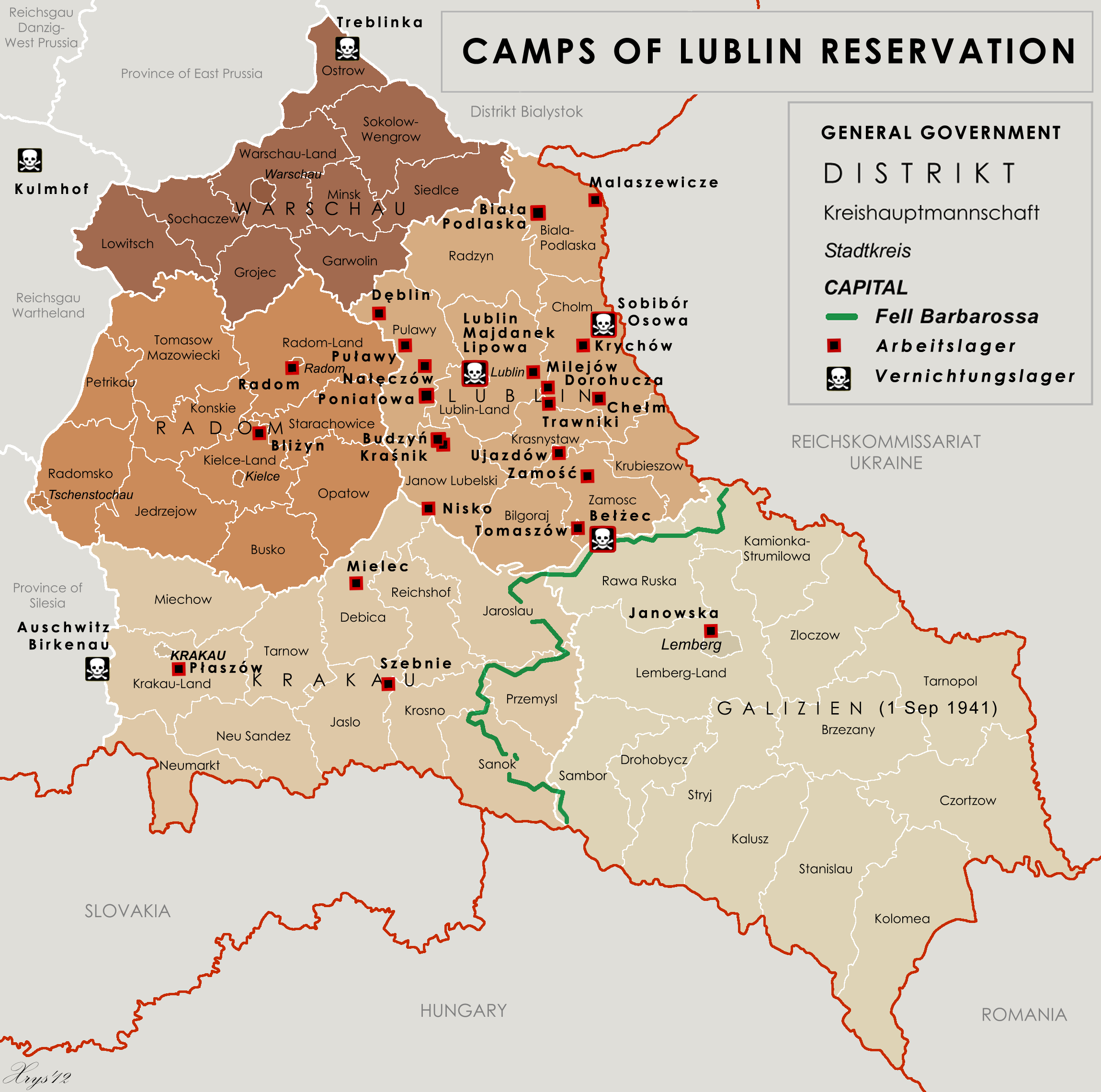
Majdanek subcamps on the map of General Government territory of occupied Poland with Zakopane at Kreis Neumarkt am Dohnst (extreme southwest) and Trawniki in the centre

Towards the end of October, the entire slave-labour workforce of KL Lublin/Majdanek including Jewish prisoners of the Trawniki concentration camp were ordered to begin the construction of trenches that would become mass graves. Although the trenches were supposedly for defense against air raids, and their zigzag shape granted some plausibility to this lie, the prisoners guessed their true purpose.^{:232}^{:403–404}^{:285–286} The massacres, later assumed to have been revenge for German defeat at Stalingrad, were set by Christian Wirth for November 3, 1943, under the codename Operation Harvest Festival, simultaneously at Majdanek, Trawniki, Poniatowa, Budzyn, Kraśnik, Puławy and Lipowa subcamps. The bodies of Jews shot in the pits by Trawniki men aided by Battalion 101 were later incinerated by a Sonderkommando from Milejów, who were executed on site upon the completion of their task by the end of 1943.

Operation Harvest Festival, with approximately 43,000 victims, was the single largest German massacre of Jews in the entire war. It surpassed the notorious massacre of more than 33,000 Jews at Babi Yar outside Kiev by 10,000 victims. The Trawniki training camp was dismantled in July 1944 because of the approaching front line. The last 1,000 Hiwis forming the SS Battalion Streibel led by Karl Streibel himself, were transported west to work at the still functioning death camps. The Soviets entered the completely empty facility on July 23, 1944. After the war, they captured and prosecuted hundreds, possibly as many as one thousand Hiwis who returned home to USSR. Most were sentenced to Gulags, and released under the Khrushchev amnesty of 1955.

The number of Hiwis tried in the West was very small by comparison. Six defendants were acquitted on all charges and set free by a West German court in Hamburg in 1976 including commandant Streibel. The Trawniki men apprehended in Soviet Union were charged with treason (not the shootings) and therefore were guilty of enlistment from the start of judicial proceedings. In the U.S. some 16 former Hiwi guards were denaturalized, some of whom were very old.

=== Failed attempts at recruiting ===
In January 1943 the SS Germanische Leitstelle in occupied Zakopane in the heartland of the Tatra Mountains embarked on a recruitment drive with an idea of forming a brand new Waffen-SS highlander division. Some 200 young Goralenvolk signed up, while offered unlimited supply of alcohol. They boarded a passenger train to Trawniki, but most left the train in Maków Podhalański once already sober. Only twelve men arrived in Trawniki. At the first opportunity they got into a major fistfight with the Ukrainians, causing havoc. They were arrested and sent away. The whole idea was abandoned as impossible by SS-Obergruppenführer Krüger in occupied Kraków by an official letter of April 5, 1943. The failure probably contributed to his dismissal on November 9, 1943, by Governor General Hans Frank. Krüger committed suicide in upper Austria two years later.
