= Caucasian-Mohammedan Legion =

German volunteer army unit (1942–45)

North Caucasian Legion Patch

The Caucasian-Mohammedan Legion (German: Kaukasisch-Mohammedanische Legion) was a volunteer unit of the German Army during World War II. The Legion was created on 13 January 1942 by order of General of the Infantry Friedrich Olbricht. In accordance with the decree of 19 February 1942, volunteers from the peoples of the North Caucasus were on 2 August 1942 allocated on a national-territorial basis separately to the North Caucasian Legion / Mountain-Caucasian Legion. The initial placement of the Legion was Wesel.

== History ==
The swastika of mythological so-called "Horse Parking". According to N. Napso, a similar symbol was depicted on the uniform of the soldiers of the Mountain-Caucasian legion

In October 1941, one for each of the Turkestan and Caucasian prisoners of war (the operation of the Abwehr "Tiger B") was created for the special purposes of Abwehr and controlled by the Stab Walli (in June 1941, it consisted of 21 Abwehr commandos, at least 70 Abwehr groups and many sabotage-intelligence schools) and subordinated to the two officers of the Abwehr, Major Andreas Meier Mader and Oberleutnant Theodor Oberländer. Oberländer was the Head of the Department of Social Sciences in Königsberg, Greifswald and Prague before the war. Oberländer was also the political leader of the Nachtigall Battalion.

The legion was created on 13 January 1942 by order of General Olbricht, commander of the Replacement Army. For this purpose, a German training headquarters was established, headed by Major Mader. He was assigned the task of replenishing the 7 companies of the respective nationalities created by prisoners of war before that. Suitable prisoners of war were to be checked, released from captivity, and after a short trial period, dressed in German uniform. On the basis of the Mayer-Mader union, it was allowed to form the Caucasian-Mohammedan and Turkestan legions. On the 19 February, the chief of armaments and the commander of the reserve army ordered the Caucasian-Mohammedan and Turkestan legions were separated. On 2 August 1942, the representatives of the Caucasian peoples were consolidated into a separate North Caucasian legion.

In 1943 the headquarters of the North Caucasian Legion was created in the town of Mirgorod of Poltava region under command of Lt. Col. Ristov. In the summer of 1944, the formation of the North Caucasian and Caucasian SS regiments began on the basis of 70 and 71 police battalions. At the end of the war in Northern Italy, the North Caucasian combat group joined the Caucasian Unity of the SS troops. The commander of the Standard Army of the SS, a former officer of the White Army Kuchuk Ulagay, joined the regiment as a regiment.

In addition to the reinforced 9 field battalions, 1 battalion of the Sonderverband "Bergmann" (Special Unit "Mountaineer") and one combat group of Waffen-SS, the natives of the North Caucasus were part of a separate Sonderkommando Schamil consisting of three groups of forces up to a platoon, three sapper, railway and road-building companies, as well as two serf regiments.

== See also ==
- Ostlegionen

== Sources ==
- Napso, N. T. (2006). "Severokavkazskie voinskie formirovanii͡a v germanskikh vooruzhennykh silakh (1941-1945 gg.)" Северокавказские воинские формирования в германских вооруженных силах (1941-1945 гг.) [North Caucasian military units in the German armed forces (1941-1945)]. Bulletin of the Adyghe State University (in Russian) (4): 20–24.
- Pahl, Magnus (17 January 2013). Fremde Heere Ost: Hitlers militärische Feindaufklärung. Ch. Links Verlag. ISBN 9783862842032.
- Kuromiya, Hiroaki; Mamoulia, Georges (25 April 2016). The Eurasian Triangle: Russia, the Caucasus and Japan, 1904-1945. Walter de Gruyter GmbH & Co KG. ISBN 9783110469592.
- Reveron, Derek S.; Murer, Jeffrey Stevenson (13 May 2013). Flashpoints in the War on Terrorism. Routledge. ISBN 978-1135449247.
- Motadel, David (30 November 2014). Islam and Nazi Germany's War. Harvard University Press. ISBN 9780674744950.
- Motadel, David (Winter 2015). "The Swastika and the Crescent". The Wilson Quarterly.
- Höpp, Gerhard; Reinwald, Brigitte, eds. (2000). Fremdeinsätze. Afrikaner und Asiaten in europäischen Kriegen, 1914–1945 [External assignments. Africans and Asians in European Wars, 1914–1945] (in German). Verlag Das Arabische Buch.
