= North Caucasian and Mountain-Caucasian legions =

Nazi military units

The North Caucasian Legion (German: Legion Nordkaukasien) and the Mountain-Caucasian Legion (German: Bergkaukasien Legion) legions were created in accordance with the order of 19 February 1942. Initially, its soldiers, recruited from the camps of prisoners of war, deserters, and partly from representatives of emigration were included in the Caucasian-Mohammedan Legion (German: Kaukasisch-Mohammedanische Legion). On 2 August 1942, in accordance with the order of 19 February 1942, all fighters of Muslim North Caucasian and Mountain Caucasian (both Muslims and Christians) origin were separated from the Caucasian-Mohamedan Legion into separate North Caucasian / Mountain-Caucasian legions. These Legions consisted of Abkhazians, Circassians, Kabardians, Balkars, Karachays, Chechens, Ingushes, and the peoples of Dagestan. Kurds, Talyshs and North Ossetians appeared later. Formally, both of these legions were the Armed Forces of the so-called North Caucasus National Committee.

patch of the North Caucasian Legion

== See also ==
- Ostlegionen
- Tscherim Soobzokov

== Sources ==
- Magnus Pahl. Fremde Heere Ost
- Kuromiya Hiroaki, Mamoulia Georges The Eurasian Triangle Russia, the Caucasus and Japan,1904-1945
- Reveron Derek S., Jeffrey Stevebson Murrey. Flashpoints in the war on terrorism. About National Committee of the N.Caucasus and Legions newspaper titled Ghazavat with motto Allah above us and Adolf Hitler beside us
- Collection of scientific articles under the publisher of Höpp Gerhard, Reinwald Brigitte.Fremdeinsätze
