= Non-Germans in the German armed forces during World War II =

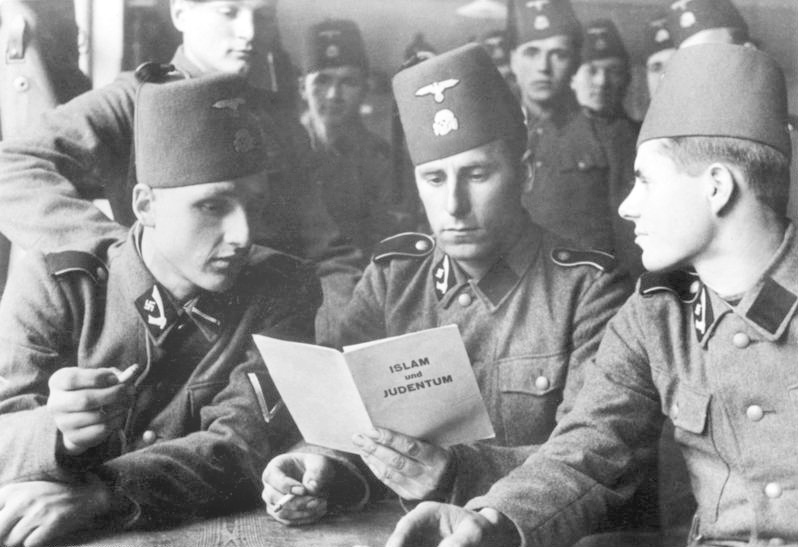
Propaganda photograph of members of the 13th SS Division of SS Handschar with a brochure titled "Islam and Judaism", 1943

Non-Germans in the German armed forces during World War II were volunteers, conscripts and those otherwise induced to join who served in Nazi Germany's armed forces during World War II. In German war-time propaganda those who volunteered for service were referred to as Freiwillige ("volunteers"). At the same time, many non-Germans in the German armed forces were conscripts or recruited from prisoner-of-war camps.

== Background and history ==
The term Freiwillige was used in Nazi propaganda to describe non-German Europeans (neither Reichsdeutsche nor Volksdeutsche) who volunteered to fight for Nazi Germany during World War II. Though largely recruited from occupied countries, they also came from co-belligerent, neutral, and even active enemy nations. From April 1940 forward, Himmler began recruiting men for the Waffen-SS from among the West and Northern European people of Norway and the Low Countries. In 1941, the 5th SS Panzer Division Wiking composed of Flemish, Dutch, Danish, and Norwegian volunteers was formed and placed under German command. Shortly thereafter, Waffen-SS troops were added from Latvia, Estonia, and elsewhere.

When Red Army soldiers were captured by the invading German forces for instance, significant numbers of the POWs began immediately aiding the Wehrmacht. Along with the forces allied to the Nazis, the Russians comprised the "largest contingent of foreign auxiliary troops on the German side with upwards of 1 million men." Many of the foreign volunteers fought in either the Waffen-SS or the Wehrmacht. Generally the non-Germanic troops were permitted into the Wehrmacht, whereas the Germanic volunteers were recruited into the service of the Waffen-SS as part of propaganda-driven "pan-Germanic army" of the future. Besides helping the Germans fight, foreign auxiliary units across occupied Europe enforced order in the occupied territories, oversaw forced labor, participated in Nazi security warfare, and assisted in the killing of the Jewish population during the Holocaust.

On the Eastern Front the volunteers and conscripts in the Ostlegionen comprised a fighting force equivalent of 30 German divisions by the end of 1943. By mid-1944 upwards of 600,000 soldiers of the Eastern Legions/Troops were assembled under the command of General Ernst-August Köstring, stemming mostly from the periphery of the Soviet empire; they consisted of non-Slavic Muslim minorities like the Turkestanis, the Volga Tatars, Northern Caucasians, and Azerbaijanis, as well as Georgians and Armenians. The overall effectiveness of Nazi Germany's military collaborators was described by one German commander as supposedly "one-fifth good, one-fifth bad, and three-fifths inconsistent."

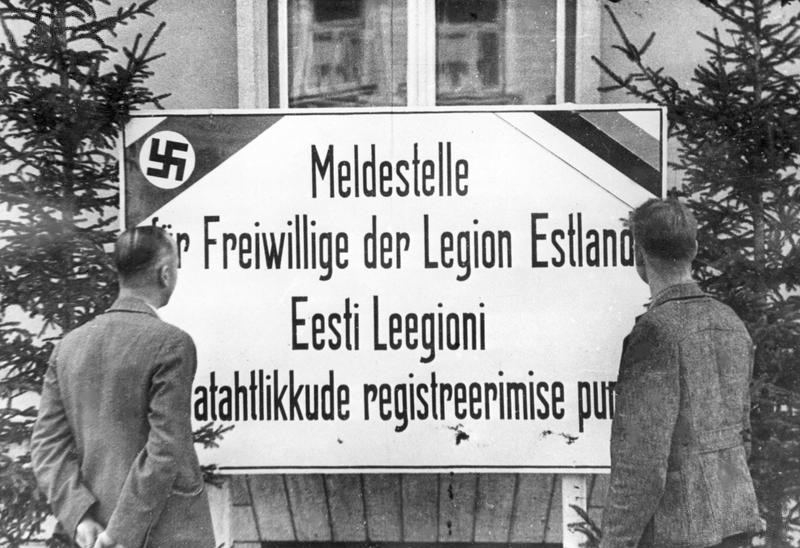
Estonian Legion registration point, 1942

Many of the foreign volunteers fought under the banner of the swastika from areas outside Europe and wanted to stave off Soviet domination or be free from British imperialism. Placing the volunteers from Eastern Europe who fought alongside the Germans into context, German historians Rolf-Dieter Müller and Gerd Ueberschär comment that people in countries from Finland to Romania "suddenly found themselves caught between the 'red' hammer and the 'brown' anvil", leaving them little in terms of options; their subsequent collective "shock over German ruthlessness was surpassed only by their dislike for and even hatred of the Soviet Union".

The non-German troops thus comprised a wide range of ethnicities, ranging from the mainly Turkic peoples in the Ostlegionen to the Muslim Slavs in the 13th SS Division of SS Handschar and the Indians of the Indische Legion (the Indian National Army fought against the British on the Japanese side). For the majority of volunteers from Muslim communities, their animosity against the Soviets stemmed from their anti-Russian feelings, religious impulses (their disdain for Soviet atheism for example), coupled by the negative experience of Stalin's policies on nationality, and by the corresponding disruption to their way of life.

Ultimately, the European collaborators remained subordinated to German oversight and were "kept on a short leash." Rolf-Dieter Müller puts the figures for the European Wehrmacht allies and volunteers who fought in the eastern campaign at approximately one-million men in total, which he claims gives substantial reason to "re-evaluate" the "military dimensions" of the overall collaboration. In Müller's estimation, the Wehrmacht would not have been capable of making it to Moscow in 1941 were it not for the Finnish, Hungarian, and Romanian conscripts; operations in the Volga and Caucasus in 1942 would have ground to a halt without the additional forces; and following the disaster at Stalingrad, it was foreign conscripts and volunteers (60,000 troops) fighting partisans in the Balkans which enabled the Germans to stabilize the Eastern Front in Finland and Ukraine. Müller also carefully reminds readers that on top of the co-opted aide of collaborators, millions of foreign laborers were forced to help provide the Nazis with the needed material resources to carry on the war far longer than otherwise possible without their toils.

== See also ==
- Waffen-SS foreign volunteers and conscripts
- Pursuit of Nazi collaborators
