= Hiwi (volunteer) =

Auxiliary volunteer corps used by Nazi Germany during World War II

Auxiliary volunteer
- Hilfswilliger, Hiwi
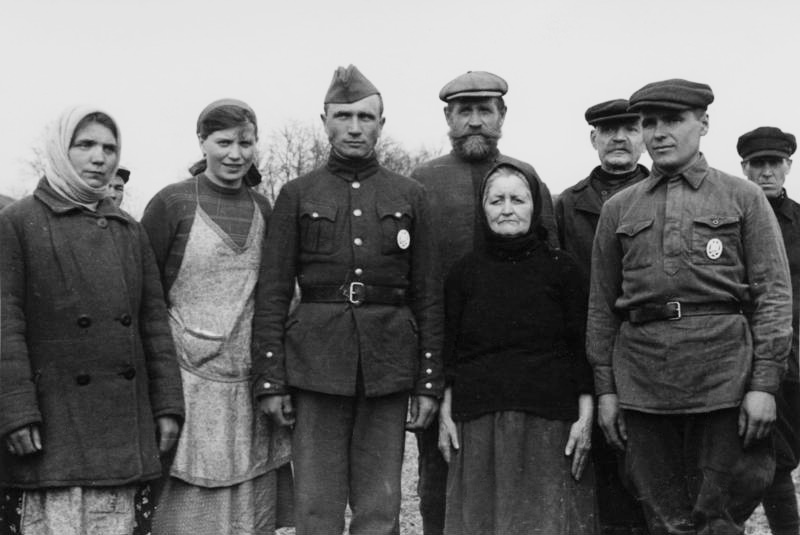
- Russia, January 1942, two former Soviet soldiers in the German Wehrmacht army, decorated with the General Assault Badge
- Active: 1941–1944
- Country: Occupied Soviet Union, Eastern Front (World War II), occupied Poland
- Allegiance: Nazi Germany
- Branch: Wehrmacht; Schutzstaffel
- Type: Auxiliary forces
- Size: 600,000 (in 1944)
- Nicknames: Hiwi, Askari

Hiwi ([ˈhiːviː]), the German abbreviation of the word Hilfswilliger or, in English, auxiliary volunteer, designated, during World War II, a member of different kinds of voluntary auxiliary forces made up of recruits indigenous to the territories of Eastern Europe occupied by Nazi Germany. Adolf Hitler reluctantly agreed to allow recruitment of Soviet citizens in the Rear Areas during Operation Barbarossa. In a short period of time, many of them were moved to combat units.

== Roles and numbers ==
A captured Hiwi told his NKVD interrogators:

Russians in the German Army can be divided into three categories. Firstly, soldiers mobilized by German troops, so-called Cossack sections, which are attached to German divisions. Secondly, Hilfswillige [Voluntary Assistants] made up of local people or Russian prisoners who volunteer, or those Red Army soldiers who desert to join the Germans. This category wears full German uniform, with their own ranks and badges. They eat like German soldiers and they are attached to German regiments. Thirdly, there are Russian prisoners who do the dirty jobs, kitchens, stables and so on. These three categories are treated in different ways, with the best treatment naturally reserved for the volunteers.

=== Fighting ===
Hiwis comprised 50% of the 2nd Panzer Army's 134th Infantry Division in late 1942, while the 6th Army at the Battle of Stalingrad was composed of 25% Hiwis. By 1944, their numbers had grown to 600,000. Both men and women were recruited. Veteran Hiwis were practically indistinguishable from regular German troops, and often served in entire company strengths.

The Hiwis may have constituted one-quarter of the 6th Army's frontline strength, amounting to over 50,000 Slavic auxiliaries serving with the German troops.

=== Policing ===
Between September 1941 and July 1944 the SS employed thousands of collaborationist auxiliary police recruited as Hiwis directly from the Soviet POW camps. After training, they were deployed for service with Nazi Germany, in the General Government, and the occupied East.

In one instance, the German SS and police inducted, processed, and trained 5,082 Hiwi guards before the end of 1944 at the SS training camp division of the Trawniki concentration camp set up in the village of Trawniki southeast of Lublin. They were known as the "Trawniki men" (German: Trawnikimänner) and were former Soviet citizens, mostly Ukrainians. Trawnikis were sent to all major killing sites of the "Final Solution", which was their training's primary purpose. They took an active role in the executions of Jews at Bełżec, Sobibor, Treblinka II, Warsaw (three times), Częstochowa, Lublin, Lvov, Radom, Kraków, Białystok (twice), Majdanek as well as Auschwitz, and Trawniki itself.

== Motivation ==
German historian Werner Röhr wrote that there were many different reasons why Soviet citizens volunteered. He argued that the issue had to be seen first and foremost with the German Vernichtungskrieg (war of annihilation) policy in mind. For example, volunteering allowed Soviet POWs to get out of the barbaric German POW camp system, giving them a much higher chance of survival. During World War II, Nazi Germany engaged in a policy of deliberate maltreatment of Soviet POWs, in contrast to their treatment of British and American POWs. This resulted in some 3.3 to 3.5 million deaths, or 57% of all Soviet POWs. Therefore, it is very difficult to differentiate between a genuine desire to volunteer, and seeming to volunteer in the hopes of a better chance of surviving the war.

== Perceptions ==
=== By the Allies ===
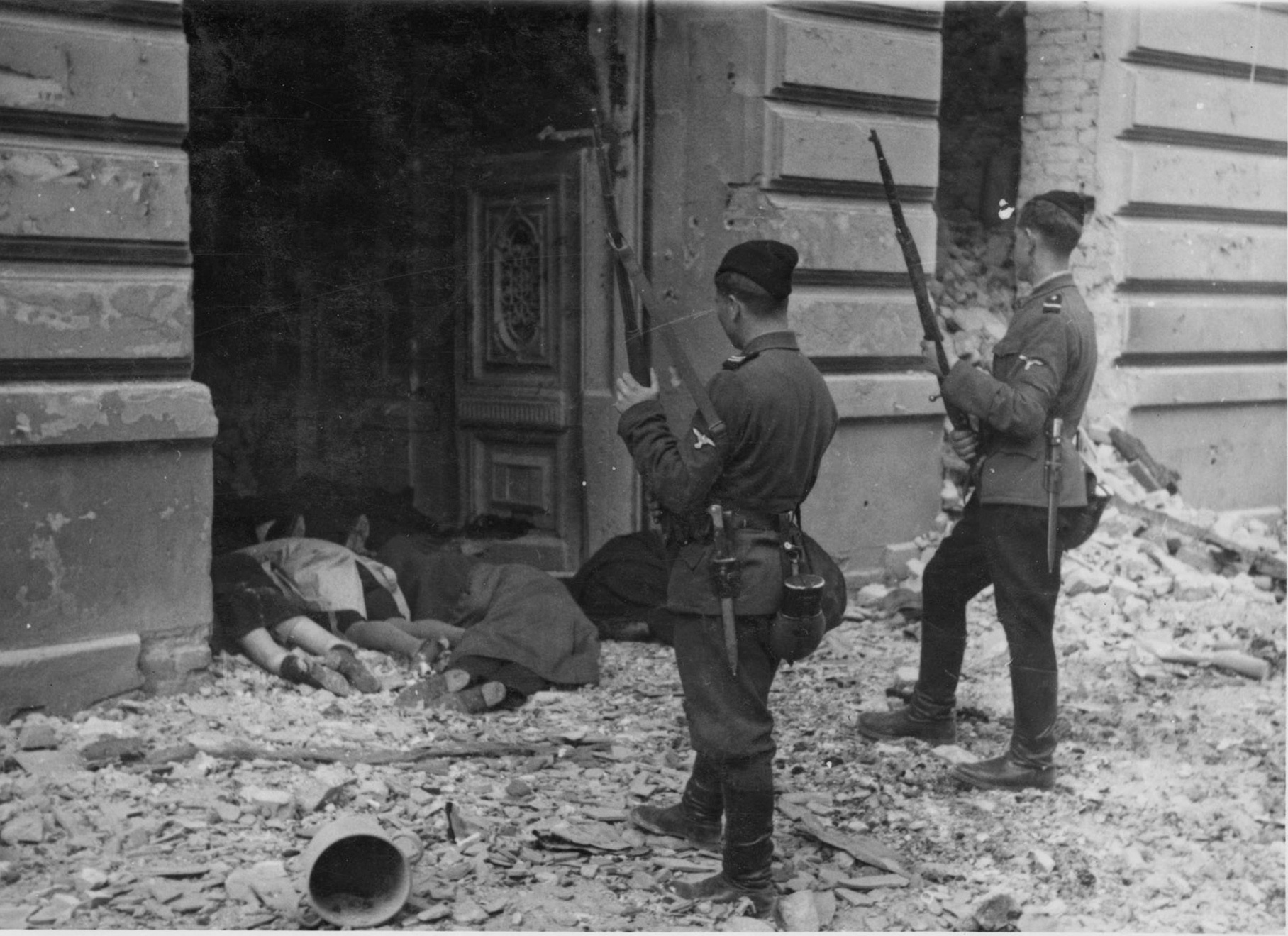
SS Trawniki men before the corpses of Jews in a doorway of the Warsaw Ghetto. Photo from Jürgen Stroop Report, May 1943.

The term 'Hiwis' acquired a thoroughly negative meaning during World War II when it entered into several other languages in reference to Ostlegionen as well as volunteers enlisted from occupied territories for service in a number of roles including hands-on shooting actions and guard duties at extermination camps on top of regular military service, drivers, cooks, hospital attendants, ammunition carriers, messengers, sappers, etc.

In the context of World War II the term has clear connotations of collaborationism, and in the case of the occupied Soviet territories also of anti-Bolshevism (widely presented as such by the Germans).

Soviet authorities referred to the Hiwis as "former Russians" regardless of the circumstances of their joining or their fate at the hands of the NKVD secret police. After the war, thousands attempted to return to their homes in the USSR. Hundreds were captured and prosecuted, charged with treason and therefore guilty of enlistment from the start of judicial proceedings. Most were sentenced to the Gulag labor camps, and released under the Khrushchev amnesty of 1955.

=== By the German authorities ===
The reliance upon Hiwis exposed a gap between Nazi ideologues and pragmatic German Army commanders. Nazi leaders including Adolf Hitler regarded all Slavs as Untermenschen and therefore of limited value as volunteers also. On the other hand, the manpower was needed, and German Intelligence had recognised the need to divide the Soviet nationals. The contradiction was sometimes disguised by reclassification of Slavs as Cossacks. Colonel Helmuth Groscurth (XI Corps' Chief of Staff) wrote to General Beck:

"It is disturbing that we are forced to strengthen our fighting troops with Russian prisoners of war, who are already being turned into gunners. It's an odd state of affairs that the "Beasts" we have been fighting against are now living with us in closest harmony."

== Contemporary use ==
The term "Hiwi" is still found in academic vernacular in German-speaking countries, in the meanings of "volunteer", "research/student assistant" (in a university), or Hilfswissenschaftler (auxiliary scientist(s)).

== See also ==
- Collaboration during World War II
- Cossack collaboration with Nazi Germany
- Waffen-SS foreign volunteers and conscripts
- Wehrmacht foreign volunteers and conscripts
- Schutzmannschaft (auxiliary police)
- Selbstschutz (self-protection units)
