= Dortan =

Commune in Auvergne-Rhône-Alpes, France

- Commune
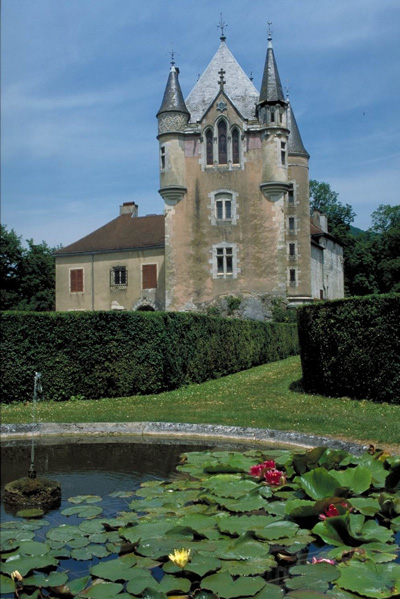
- Château

- Coat of arms
- Location of Dortan
- Location within France Location within Auvergne-Rhône-Alpes
- Coordinates: 46°19′08″N 05°39′36″E
- Country: France
- Region: Auvergne-Rhône-Alpes
- Department: Ain
- Arrondissement: Nantua
- Canton: Pont-d'Ain
- Intercommunality: Haut-Bugey Agglomération

Government
  - Mayor (2026–32): Lionel Cornaton
- Area^{1}: 18.11 km^{2} (6.99 sq mi)
- Elevation: 330 m (1,080 ft)
- Population (2023): 2,074
  - Density: 114.5/km^{2} (296.6/sq mi)
- Time zone: UTC+01:00 (CET)
  - Summer (DST): UTC+02:00 (CEST)
- INSEE/Postal code: 01148 /01590
- ^{1} French Land Register data, which excludes lakes, ponds, glaciers > 1 km^{2} (0.386 sq mi or 247 acres) and river estuaries.

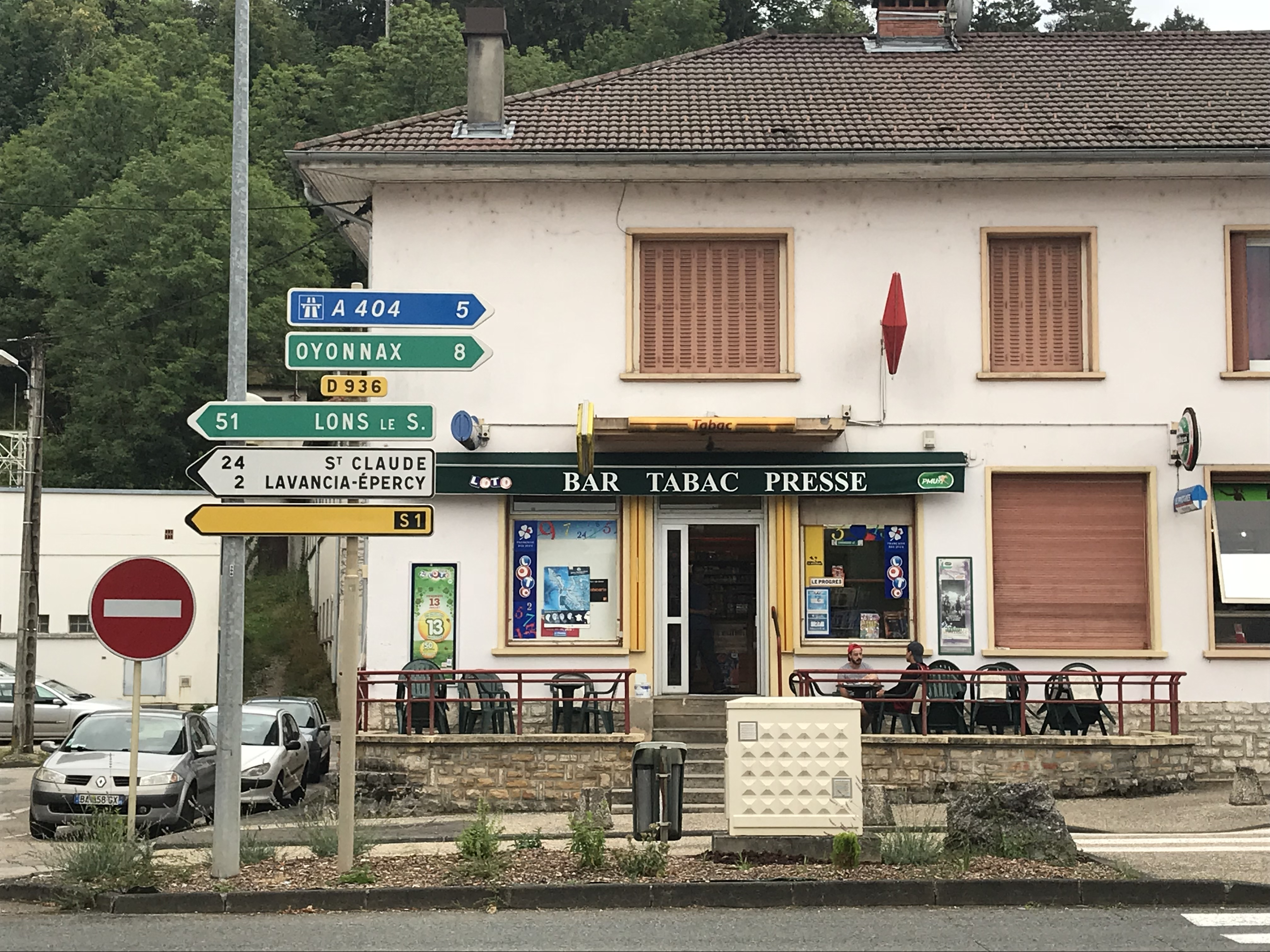
Dortan street scene

Dortan (French pronunciation: [dɔʁtɑ̃]) is a commune in the Ain department in eastern France. Besides the village of Dortan itself, the commune includes the hamlets of Uffel, Vouais, Bonaz, Emondeau, Sénissiat and Maissiat.

== History ==
This area was settled in the first century AD by the Sequani, a Gallic people. It was on a route used by the Romans and by the seventh century, the Abbaye de Saint-Claude had been established nearby and the area was evangelized. During the feudal period in the ninth century, the counts were Lambert and Geoffroy de Dortenc, and twenty generations of these seignieres followed. The Château de Dortan was built in the fifteenth century as a replacement for the original twelfth century building. It was attacked on many occasions, including by Cardinal Richelieu in 1637. The last of the de Dortenc lineage was Jean-François de Dortenc, who died in 1708. He had committed various misdeeds and his successor sold the château to Pierre Gaulthier, adviser and secretary of Louis XIV. Today the château is in private ownership and is included in the list of Monument historiques.

=== 1944 massacre ===
In July 1944, during World War II, the Germans looted and burned the village in reprisal for activities by the French Maquis. Seven people were shot on 12 July, including the village priest and a woman. The following day, three villagers were killed and women were raped. On 20 and 21 July, 15 men were arrested and tortured at the château, which was occupied by the German troops. The next day, the remaining inhabitants were rounded up and gathered in the château while the houses in the village were burnt down. In total, 35 civilians were killed, the village was razed and only the château was left standing.

== Geography ==
Dortan is in the northeastern part of the department of Ain in eastern France, in the arrondissement of Nantua, 27 km from the Swiss border and 7 km (4 mi) north of Oyonnax. It lies on the river Bienne, in the western part of the Jura Mountains. The commune includes the hamlets of Uffel, Vouais, Bonaz, Emondeau, Sénissiat and Maissiat, and scattered farms. The D436 road connects the village to Saint-Claude.

== Population ==
Historical population
Year	Pop.	±% p.a.
1968	1,425	—
1975	1,445	+0.20%
1982	1,609	+1.55%
1990	2,107	+3.43%
1999	2,186	+0.41%
2007	2,088	−0.57%
2012	1,871	−2.17%
2017	1,846	−0.27%
2023	2,074	+1.96%
Source: INSEE

== See also ==
- Communes of the Ain department
