= Ostlegionen =

World War II German army units composed of Soviet personnel

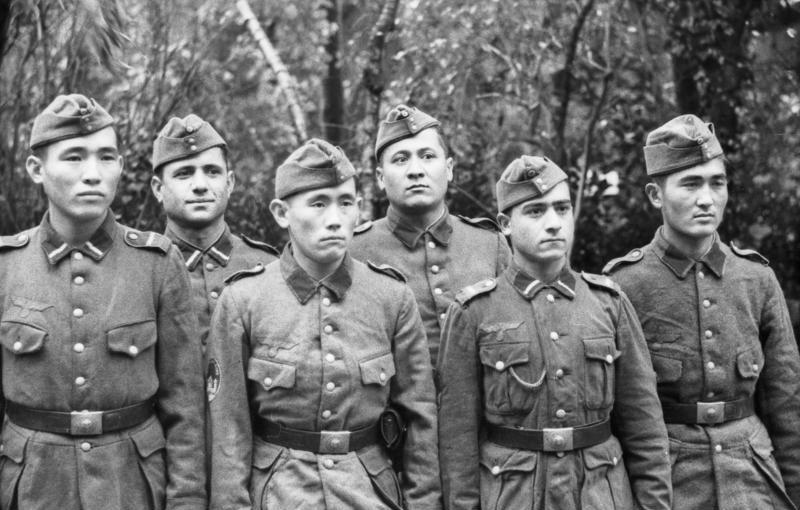
Soldiers of the Turkestan Legion in France, c. 1943.

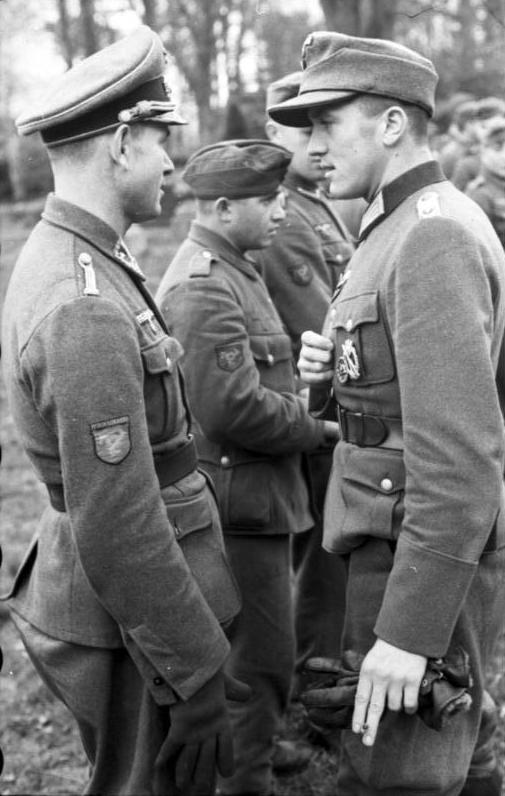
Members of the North Caucasian Legion in France in 1943.

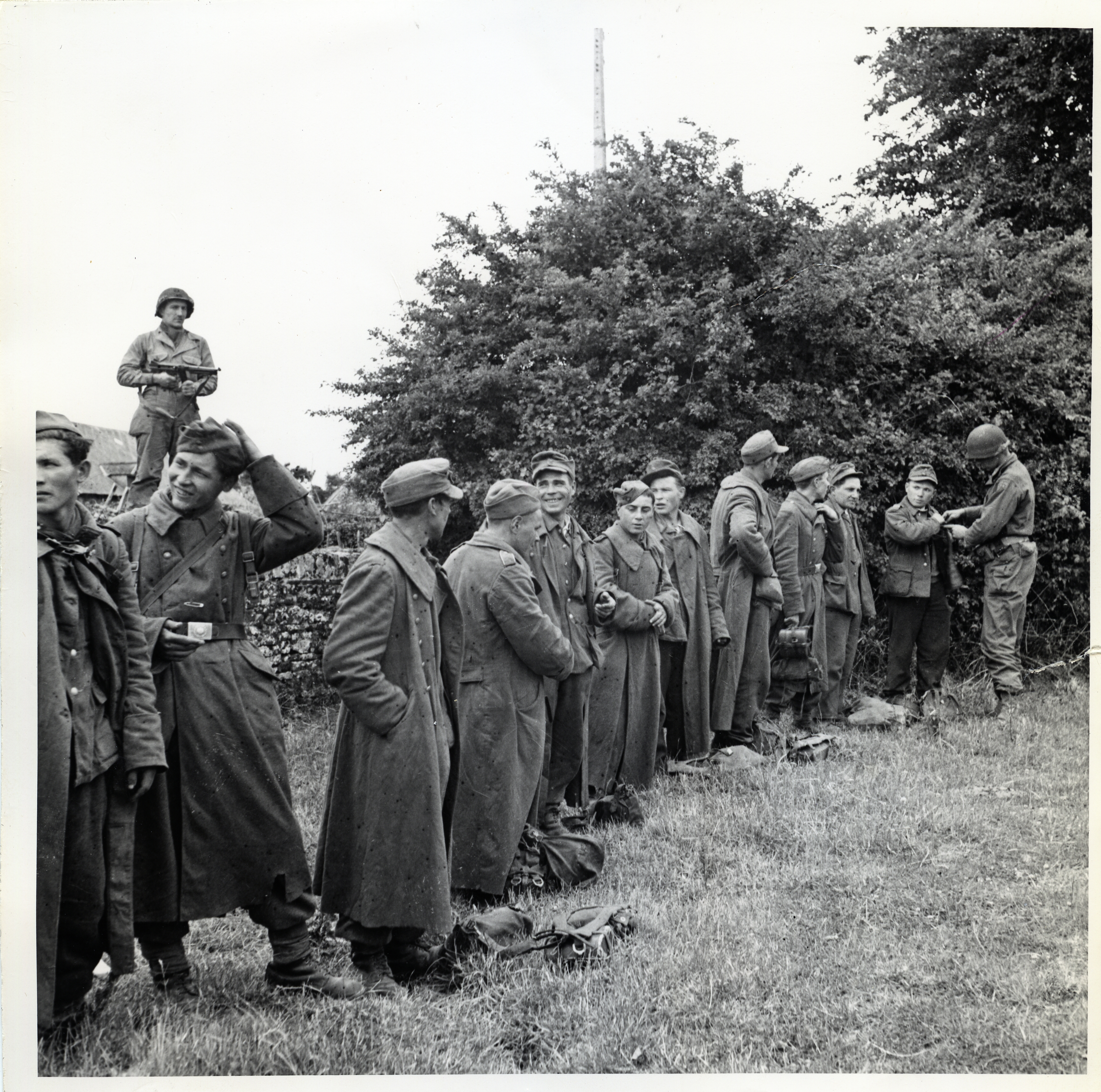
Russian Ostelegionen troops surrender to Allied forces on the Western Front. Prior to deserting, they killed their German NCO.

Ostlegionen ("eastern legions"), Ost-Bataillone ("eastern battalions"), Osttruppen ("eastern troops"), and Osteinheiten ("eastern units") were units in the Army of Nazi Germany during World War II made up of personnel from Eastern Europe. They were a large part of the Wehrmacht foreign volunteers and conscripts.

== Background ==
Some members of the Ostlegionen units were conscripted or coerced into serving; others volunteered. Many were former Soviet personnel, recruited from prisoner of war camps. Osttruppen were frequently stationed away from front lines and used for coastal defence or rear-area activities, such as security operations, thus freeing up regular German forces for front-line service. They belonged to two distinct types of units:

- Ost-Bataillone were composed of various nationalities, raised mostly amongst prisoners of war (POW) captured in Eastern Europe, who had been formed into battalion-sized units, which were integrated individually into German combat formations, and;
- Ostlegionen were larger foreign legion-type units raised amongst members of a specific ethnic minority or minorities, and comprising multiple battalions.

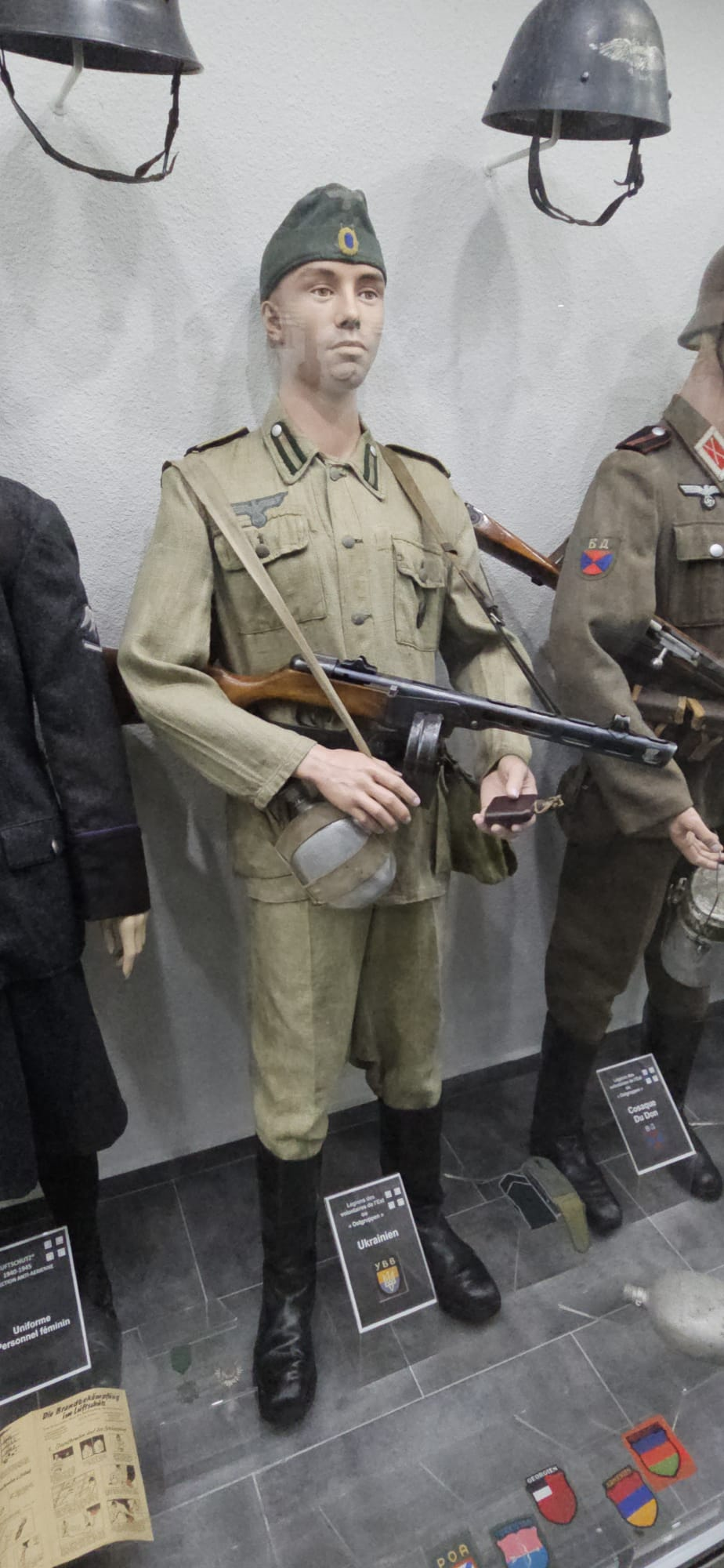
Uniform of Ukrainian soldier part of Ostlegionen during WW2

Members of Osteinheiten usually faced execution or harsh terms of imprisonment if they were captured by Soviet forces or repatriated to the USSR by the western Allies. Frequently, emigres in the service of the Wehrmacht had the upper hand in those units or otherwise worked with former Red Army soldiers.

== Ost-Bataillone ==
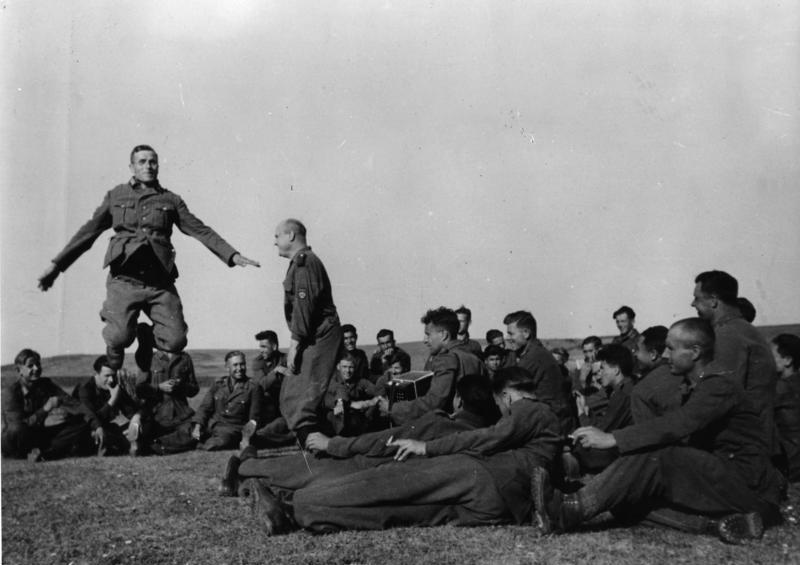
Russian soldiers performing a traditional dance, 1944.

Ost-Bataillone wore German uniforms and equipment and were integrated into larger German formations. They began as the private initiatives of individual military commanders. Most were utilized on the Eastern Front and in the Balkans.

In 1944, a number of Ost-Bataillone were stationed in northern France, in anticipation of an Allied invasion of Western Europe. Units that fought in Normandy against Allied Operation Overlord were part of the German 243rd and 709th Static Infantry Divisions, positioned in the vicinity of the Utah, Juno and Sword invasion beaches. Ost-Bataillone were also present in southern France, during the Allied landings codenamed Operation Dragoon (August 1944).

=== List of Eastern Battalions ===
==== 1–399 ====
№	Name	Formation	Location of formation	Disbandment	Notes	Source
7	7th Eastern Battalion	December 1944	Poland		In April 1945, it was renamed the 7th Russian Battalion and was located in eastern Germany.	
82						
134	134th Hetman Battalion	1942	Central Russia	27 November 1943	The unit became the 134th Volunteer Security Battalion in 1942. On 18 November 1942, it was renamed the 134th Eastern Battalion and was still located in central Russia.	
229						
263						
268						
308	23rd Volunteer Battalion	June 1942	Central Russia	Transferred to the 600th Infantry Division in western Germany in February 1945	It became the 308th Eastern Battalion on 8 November 1942. It was renamed the 308th Russian Battalion while in German-occupied Poland in late 1944.	
318						
339						

==== 400–599 ====
№	Name	Formation	Location of formation	Disbandment	Notes	Source
406	6th Volunteer Battalion	June 1942	Central Russia		It became the 406th Eastern Battalion on 1 November 1942. It was moved to southern France on 28 September 1943. It was renamed the 406th Russian Battalion on 6 July 1944. In northern Italy as of September 1944.	
412						
427						
439	39th Volunteer Battalion	June 1942	Central Russia	October 1944	It became the 439th Eastern Battalion on 8 November 1942. It was sent to Northern France in October 1943. On 19 April 1944, it was made the IV (Eastern) Bn./726th Grenadier Regiment. In eastern France as of August 1944.	
441						
446	46th Volunteer Battalion	June 1942	Central Russia	May 1944	It became the 446th Eastern Battalion on 8 November 1942. It was reformed on 15 January 1943.	
447						
448						
449						
454						
550						
551	6th Ukrainian Battalion	17 June 1942	Southern Russia		It became the 551st Eastern Battalion on 30 November 1942. Renamed the 651st Eastern Supply Battalion on 1 February 1944. In 1945, it became the 651st Ukrainian Supply Battalion while in western Germany.	
556						
559						
561						
574						

==== 600–699 ====
№	Name	Formation	Location of formation	Disbandment	Notes	Source
600						
601	Berezina Eastern Combat Battalion	1 June 1942	Central Russia	Transferred to the Russian 600th Infantry Division in western Germany in October 1944	It became the 601st Berezina Eastern Battalion on 23 October 1942. It became the 601st Eastern Engineer Bridging Battalion in May 1943 while in southern France. Renamed the 601st Russian Engineer Bridging Battalion on 13 July 1944.	
602	Dnieper Eastern Combat Battalion	29 April 1942	Central Russia	Destroyed in western France on 17 August 1944	It became the 602nd Dnieper Eastern Battalion on 23 October 1942. It was moved to northern France on 5 November 1943.	
603	Düna Eastern Combat Battalion	4 July 1942	Central Russia		On 30 September 1942, it became the 603rd Düna Eastern Battalion. As of December 1943, it was in Denmark. It became the I Bn./(Eastern) 714th Grenadier Regiment on 30 April 1944. From 22 June 1944, the regiment was called Russian instead of Eastern. In April 1945, it became the I Bn./(Russian) 1604th Grenadier Regiment, still in Denmark.	
604	Pripjet Eastern Combat Battalion	14 July 1942	Central Russia	May 1943	On 30 September 1942, it became the 604th Pripjet Eastern Battalion.	
605	Wolga Eastern Combat Battalion	9 July 1942	Central Russia	Transferred to the 600th Infantry Division in western Germany in February 1945	On 5 October 1942, it was numbered as the 605th Wolga Eastern Battalion. In November 1943, it was in northern France. On 14 December 1943, it became the 605th Eastern Engineer Bridging Battalion. On 13 July 1944, it became the 605th Russian Engineer Bridging Battalion, still in northern France.	
615						
616						
617						
618	People's Militia Battalion Trutschevsk	21 June 1942	Central Russia	Transferred to the 600th Russian Infantry Division in western Germany in November 1944	Aka. People's Defence Battalion Trutschevsk. On 18 November 1942, it was numbered as the 618th Eastern Battalion. It was in Belarus in October 1943, but was moved to northern France in November that same year. The unit was reformed as a motorized battalion on 19 April 1944.	
619	People's Militia Battalion Dmitrovsk	21 June 1942	Central Russia	November 1943	Aka. People's Defence Battalion Dmitrovsk. On 18 November 1942, it was numbered as the 619th Eastern Battalion. In June 1943, it became a training battalion.	
620	People's Militia Battalion Kromy	21 June 1942	Central Russia		Aka. People's Defence Battalion Kromy. On 18 November 1942, it was numbered as the 620th Eastern Battalion. In August 1943, it was in Belarus and moved to Northern Italy in November. In February 1944, it became the II Bn./274th Grenadier Regiment. In March 1945, it became the 620th Russian Battalion.	
621						
627						
628	I/582nd Volunteer Battalion	30 September 1942	Central Russia	Transferred to the 600th Russian Infantry Division in western Germany on 13 December 1944	Renumbered as the 628th Eastern Battalion on 19 November 1942. In November 1943, it was in Belgium. From 19 April 1944, it was the I (Eastern) Bn./745th Grenadier Regiment. During September and November of 1944, it was in Belgium and the Netherlands.	
629	II/582nd Volunteer Battalion	30 September 1942	Central Russia	29 September 1944	Numbered as the 629th Eastern Battalion on 19 November 1942. It was in Belarus in October 1943. Moved to Northern France on 25 November 1943. It became the IV (Eastern) Bn./899th Grenadier Regiment on 19 April 1944.	
630						
633						
634						
635						
636						
637						
642						
643						
646						
647						
648						
649					Attached to the 729th Fortress Grenadier Regiment of the 709th Infantry Division in Normandy, France at the time of Operation Overlord. Isolated on the Cotentin Peninsula the division surrendered in June, 1944.	
651						
653	410th Russian Security Battalion	Summer 1942	Northern Russia		Numbered as the 653th Eastern Battalion on 23 October 1942. As of December 1943, it was in Denmark. It became the II Bn./(Eastern) 714th Grenadier Regiment on 30 April 1944. From 22 June 1944, the regiment was called Russian instead of Eastern. In April 1945, it became the II Bn./(Russian) 1604th Grenadier Regiment, still in Denmark.	
654	510th Russian Security Battalion	Summer 1942	Northern Russia	Became part of the 77th Waffen Grenadier Regiment of the SS (30th Waffen Grenadier Division of the SS) on 21 October 1944.	It became the 654th Eastern Battalion on 23 October 1942. Moved to Southern France in October 1943.	
658	181st Estonian Security Battalion	August 1941	Northern Russia	June 1944	It became the (Estonian) 658th Eastern Battalion on 23 October 1942.	
659	182nd Estonian Security Battalion	August 1941	Northern Russia	June 1944	It became the (Estonian) 659th Eastern Battalion on 23 October 1942.	
660	184th Estonian Security Battalion	August 1941	Northern Russia	June 1944	It became the (Estonian) 660th Eastern Battalion on 23 October 1942.	
661	183rd Estonian Security Battalion	20 August 1941	Northern Russia	November 1944	It became the (Russian) 661st Eastern Battalion on 23 October 1942. Moved to southern France in November 1943. On April 19, 1944, it became the IV Bn./239th Reserve Grenadier Regiment.	
662	185th Estonian Security Battalion	September 1941	Northern Russia		It became the (Russian) 662nd Eastern Battalion on 23 October 1942. Moved to Denmark in December 1943. On April 30, 1944, it became the III (Russian) Bn./712th Grenadier Regiment. It re-became the (Russian) 662nd Eastern Battalion in September 1944. In April 1945, it became the (Russian) 1605th Grenadier Regiment that was stationed in Denmark.	
663	186th Estonian Security Battalion	Summer 1942	Northern Russia	Transferred to the 600th Infantry Division in West Germany in February 1945	It became the (Russian) 663rd Eastern Battalion on 23 October 1942. Moved to Southern France in December 1943. It became the I Bn./759th Grenadier Regiment on 19 April 1944. In September 1944, the battalion was almost destroyed.	
664	187th Finnish Security Battalion	Summer 1942	Northern Russia	Disbanded in 1944	Numbered as the (Finnish) 664th Eastern Battalion on 23 October 1942.	
665	188th Russian Security Battalion	Summer 1942	Northern Russia	September 1944	Numbered as the (Russian) 665th Eastern Battalion on 23 October 1942. Moved to southern France in October 1943. It became the III (Eastern) Bn/757th Fortress Grenadier Regiment on 19 April 1944.	
666	189th Russian Security Battalion	Summer 1942	Northern Russia	Transferred to the 600th Infantry Division in West Germany in October 1944	Numbered as the (Russian) 666th Eastern Engineering Battalion on 23 October 1942. Moved to southern France in October 1943. It became the IV (Eastern) Bn./932nd Fortress Grenadier Regiment on 19 April 1944. The naming changed on 21 July 1944 to IV (Russian) Bn./932nd Grenadier Regiment. As of August 1944, it was still in southern France.	
667						
668	II Bn./16th Irregular Light Regiment	2 October 1942	Northern Russia	17 December 1943	Became the 668th Eastern Battalion on 14 January 1943. It was renamed the Schnittenheim Eastern Battalion in November 1943.	
669						
672						
674						
675						
680						

==== 700–799 ====
№	Name	Formation	Location of formation	Disbandment	Notes	Source
795				Surrendered 7 June 1944 in France.	Georgian unit attached to the 739th Fortress Grenadier Regiment of the 709th Infantry Division in Normandy, France, at the time of Operation Overlord. The battalion held Turqueville behind Utah Beach, and surrendered to the US 8th Infantry Division on 7 June 1944.	

== Osttruppen ==
Name of unit	Size and composition
Russian Liberation Army	Known as the "Vlasov Army"; a corps-sized formation composed mostly of Soviet citizens under the command of the former Soviet general Andrey Vlasov.
1st SS Cossack Cavalry Division	Cavalry division made up of Cossack volunteers; transferred in 1945 from the Wehrmacht to the Waffen-SS.
Georgian Legion	12 battalions, consisting of ethnic Georgians.
Armenian Legion	Eleven battalions consisting of ethnic Armenians.
Azerbaijani Legion	Initially, Azerbaijanis were included in the Caucasian-Mohammedan Legion until 1942 when a separate legion composed of only Azerbaijanis was formed.
Caucasian-Mohammedan Legion	Composed of Circassians, Daghestanis, Chechens, Ingushes, and Lezghins.
North Caucasian and Mountain-Caucasian legions	Consisted of Abkhazians, Circassians, Kabardians, Balkars, Karachais, Chechens, Ingushes, Daghestanis, Kurds, Talyshis, and North Ossetians, separated from the Caucasian-Mohammedan Legion in accordance with the order of 19 February 1942.
Turkestan Legion	Eight battalions, composed of Turkmens, Uzbeks, Kyrgyz, Tajiks and other Central Asian nationalities; saw action as the 162nd Turkestan Division, in Yugoslavia and Italy.
Idel Ural Legion	Composed of volunteers from Idel-Ural peoples including Tatars, Bashkirs, Chuvashes, Udmurts, and Mordvins.
Freiwilligen-Stamm-Division (Regular Volunteer Division)	Established in 1944, it consisted of Turkic, Azerbaijani, Georgian, Tatar, Cossack, Armenian and other Soviet volunteers, spread over five regiments. Involved in anti-partisan operations against the French Resistance. Known for the Dortan massacre in July 1944.

== See also ==
- Hiwi (volunteer)
- German atrocities committed against Soviet prisoners of war
- Nazi racial theories
- East German Army, military of East Germany

== Bibliography ==
- Elizabeth M.F. Grasmeder, "Leaning on Legionnaires: Why Modern States Recruit Foreign Soldiers," International Security (July 2021), Vol 46 (No. 1), pp. 147–195.
- Kedward, Harry Roderick (1993). In Search of the Maquis : Rural Resistance in Southern France 1942–1944. Clarendon Press. ISBN 978-0191591785.
- Lieb, Peter (2007). Konventioneller Krieg oder NS-Weltanschauungskrieg. Kriegführung und Partisanenbekämpfung in Frankreich 1943/44 [Conventional or NS-ideological war. Warfare and anti-partisan fighting in France 1943/44] (in German). R. Oldenbourg Verlag. ISBN 978-3486579925.
- Thomas, Nigel (2000). The German Army 1939–45 (5): Western Front 1943–45: Western Front, 1944–45 v. 5 (Men-at-Arms). Osprey Publishing. ISBN 978-1855327979.
- Thomas, Nigel (2015). Hitler's Russian & Cossack Allies 1941–45. Bloomsbury Publishing. ISBN 9781472806888.
