= Lublin =

City in Lublin Voivodeship, Poland

- City county
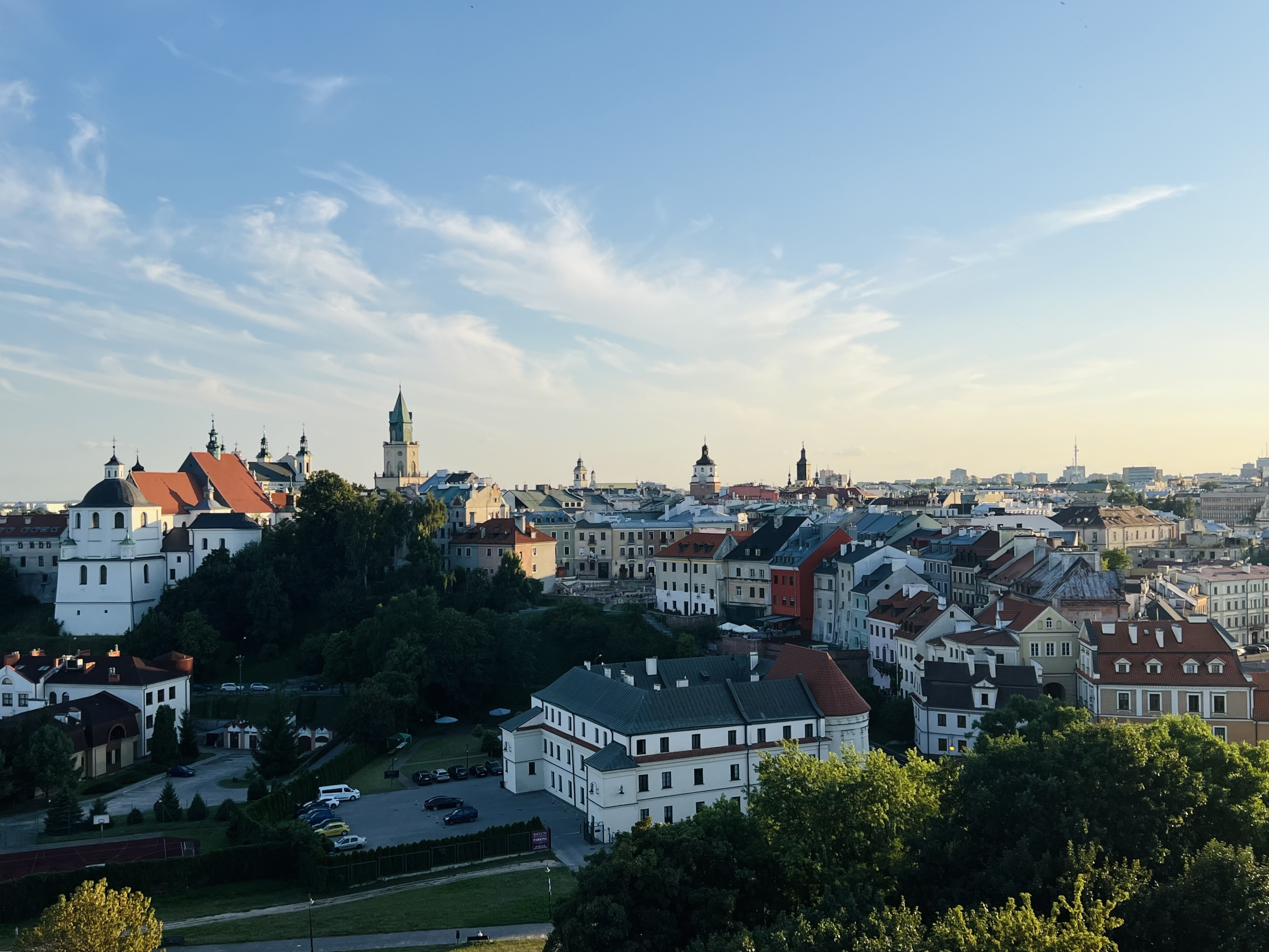
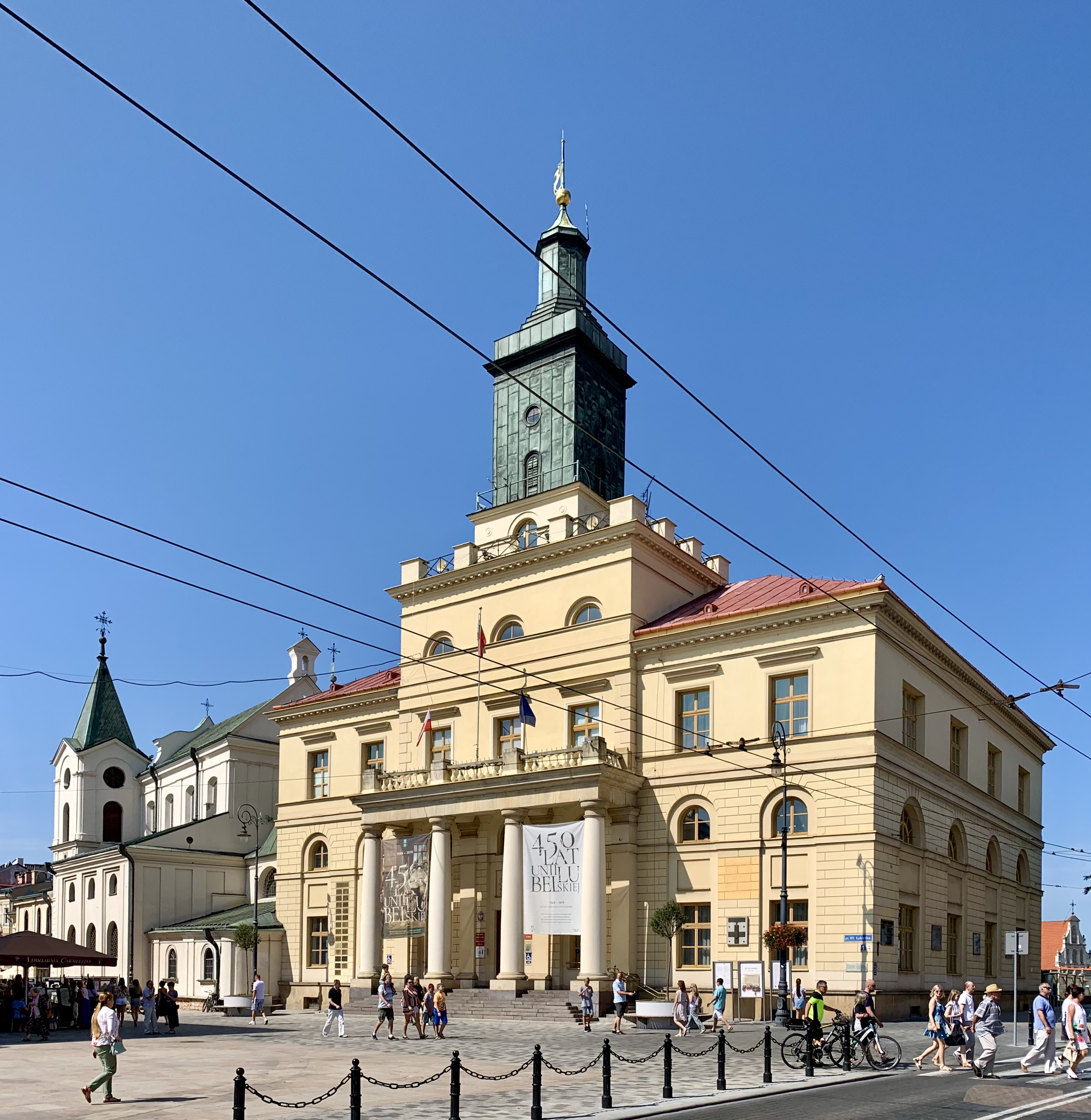
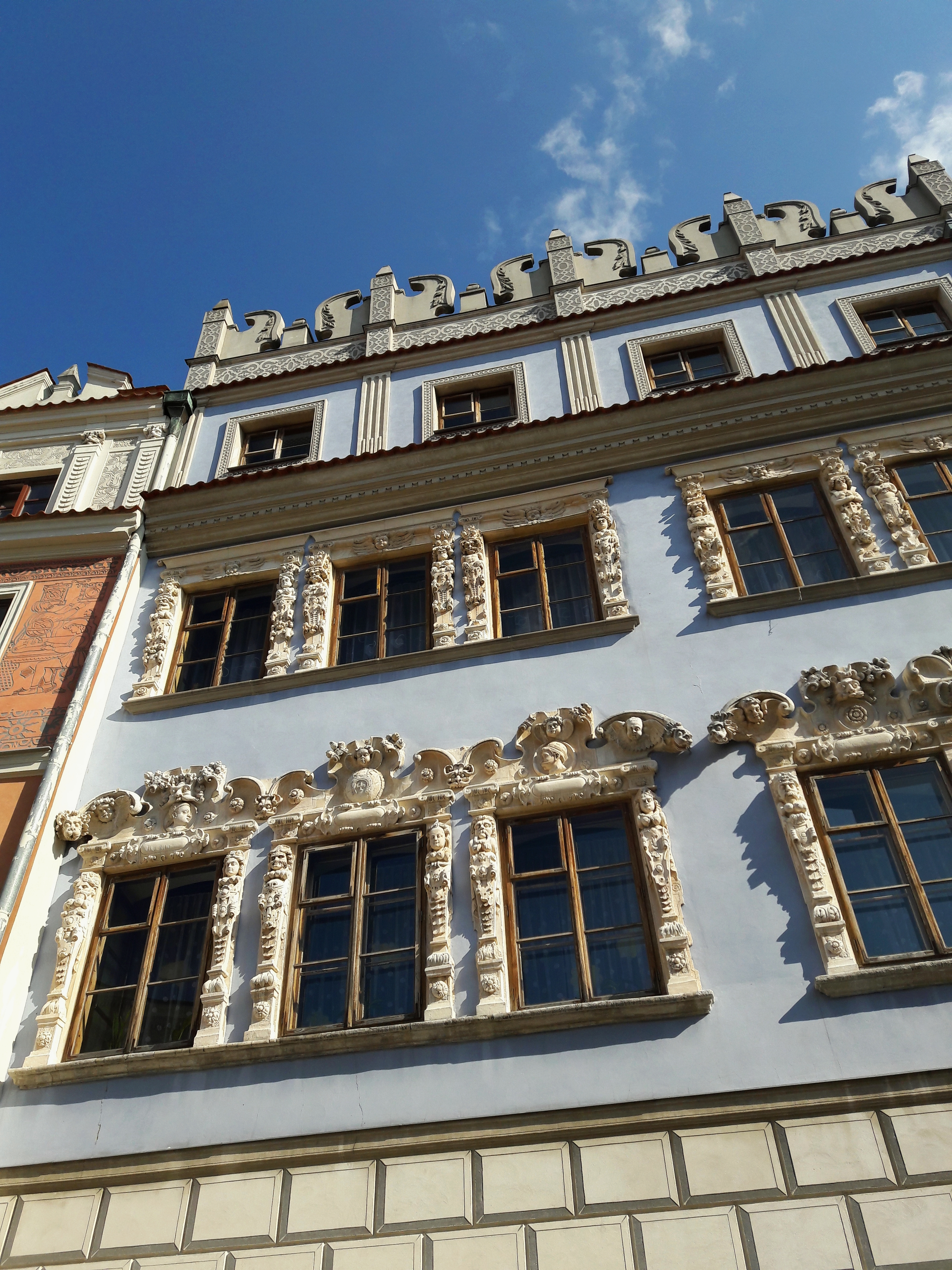
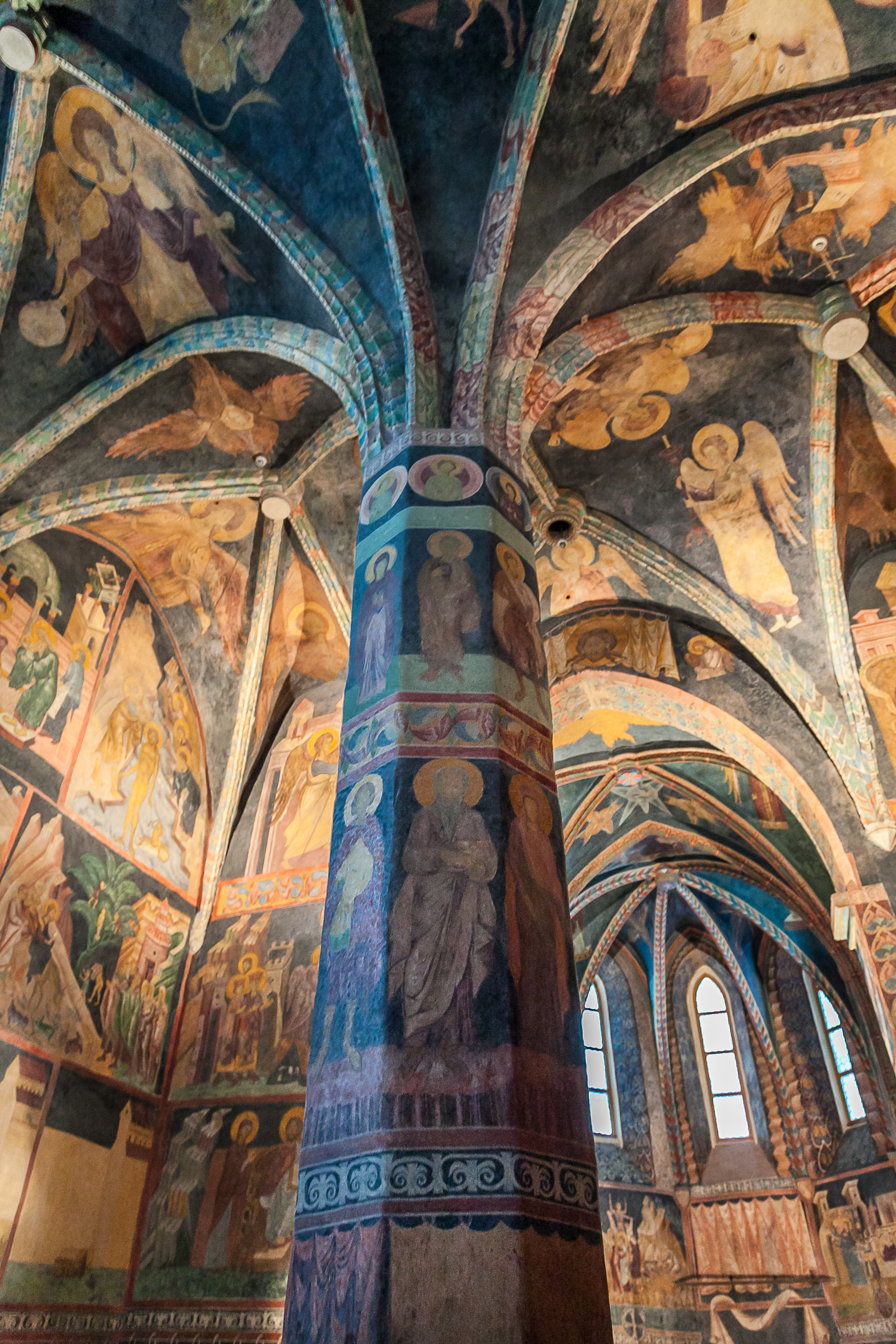
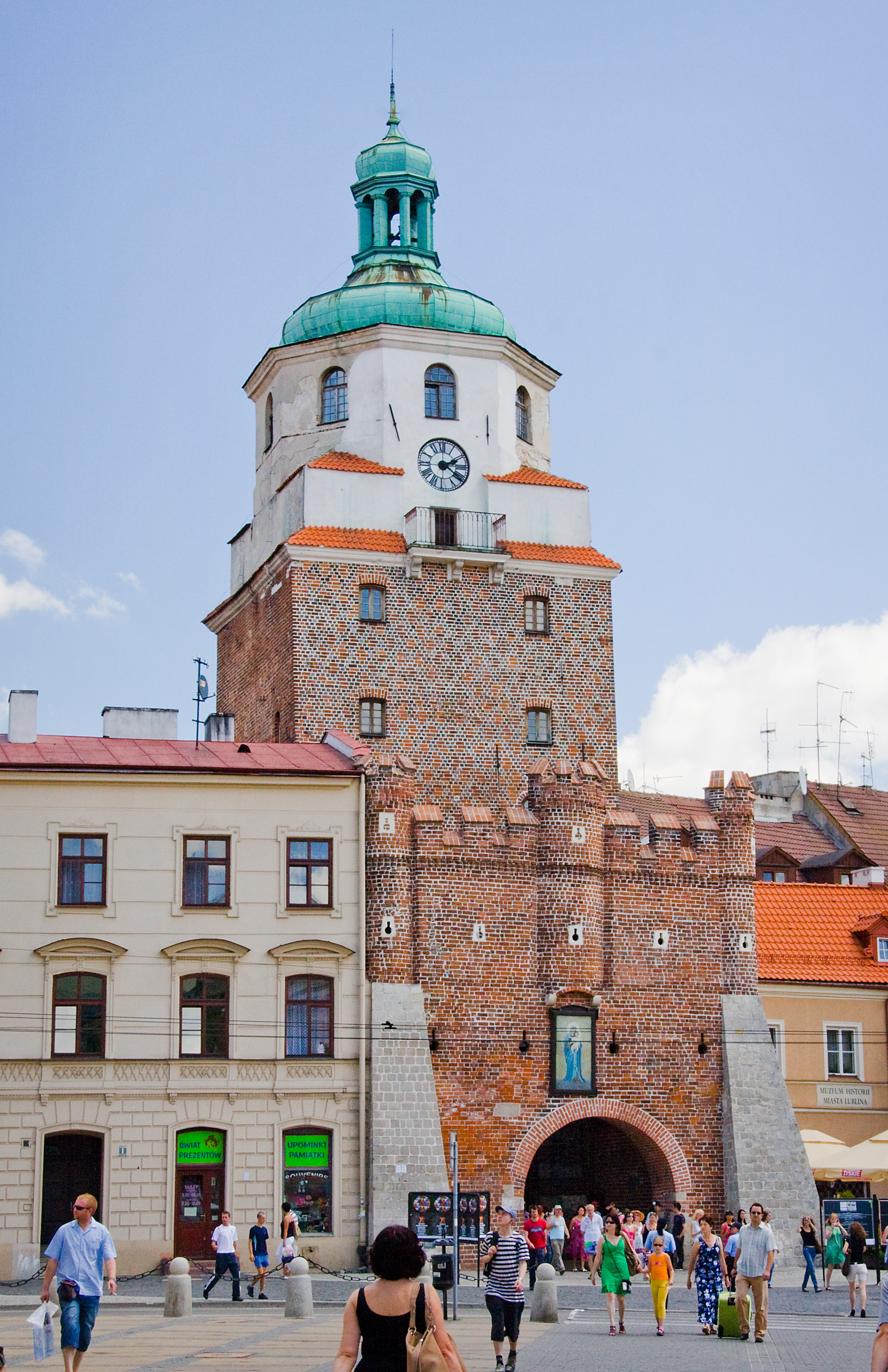
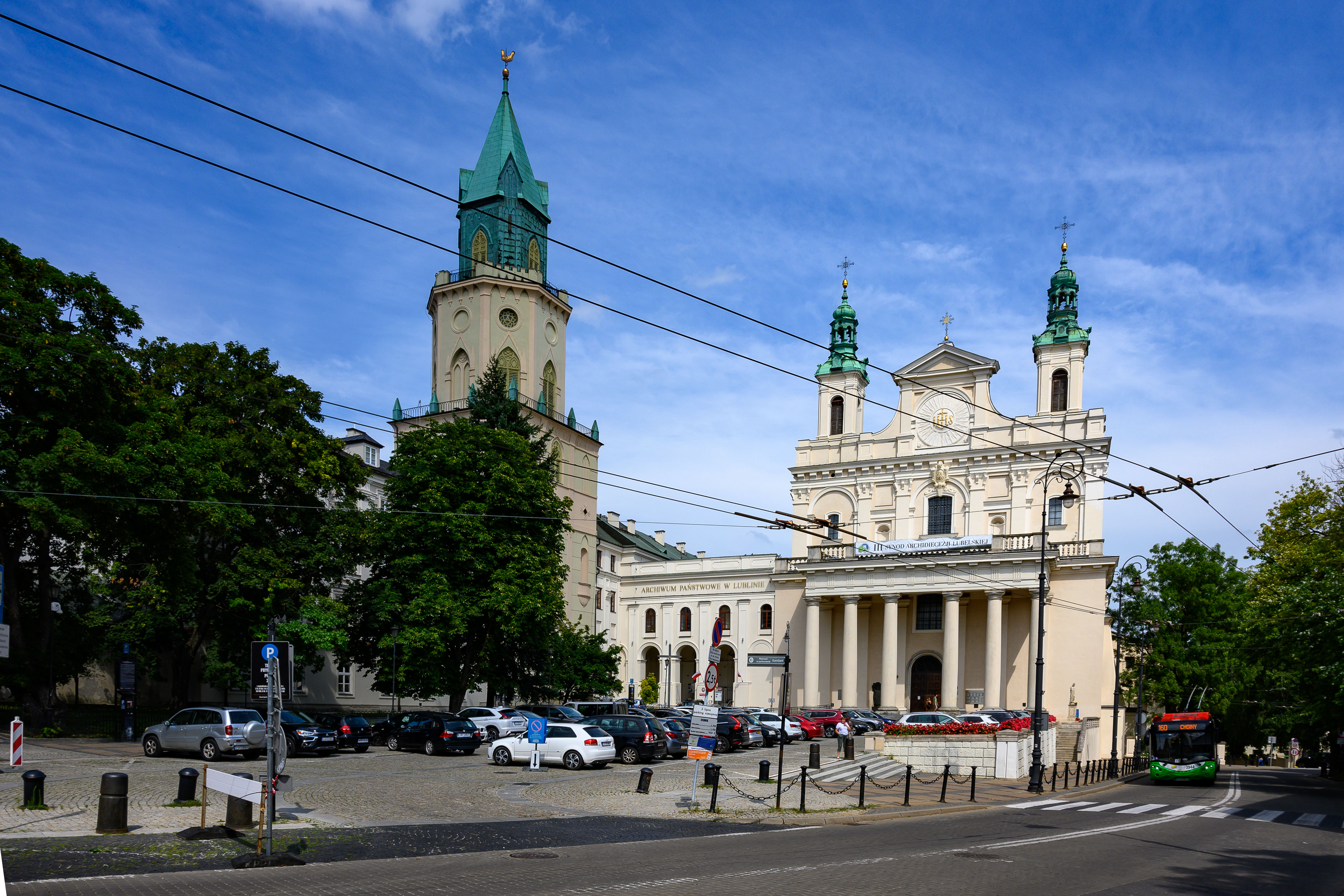
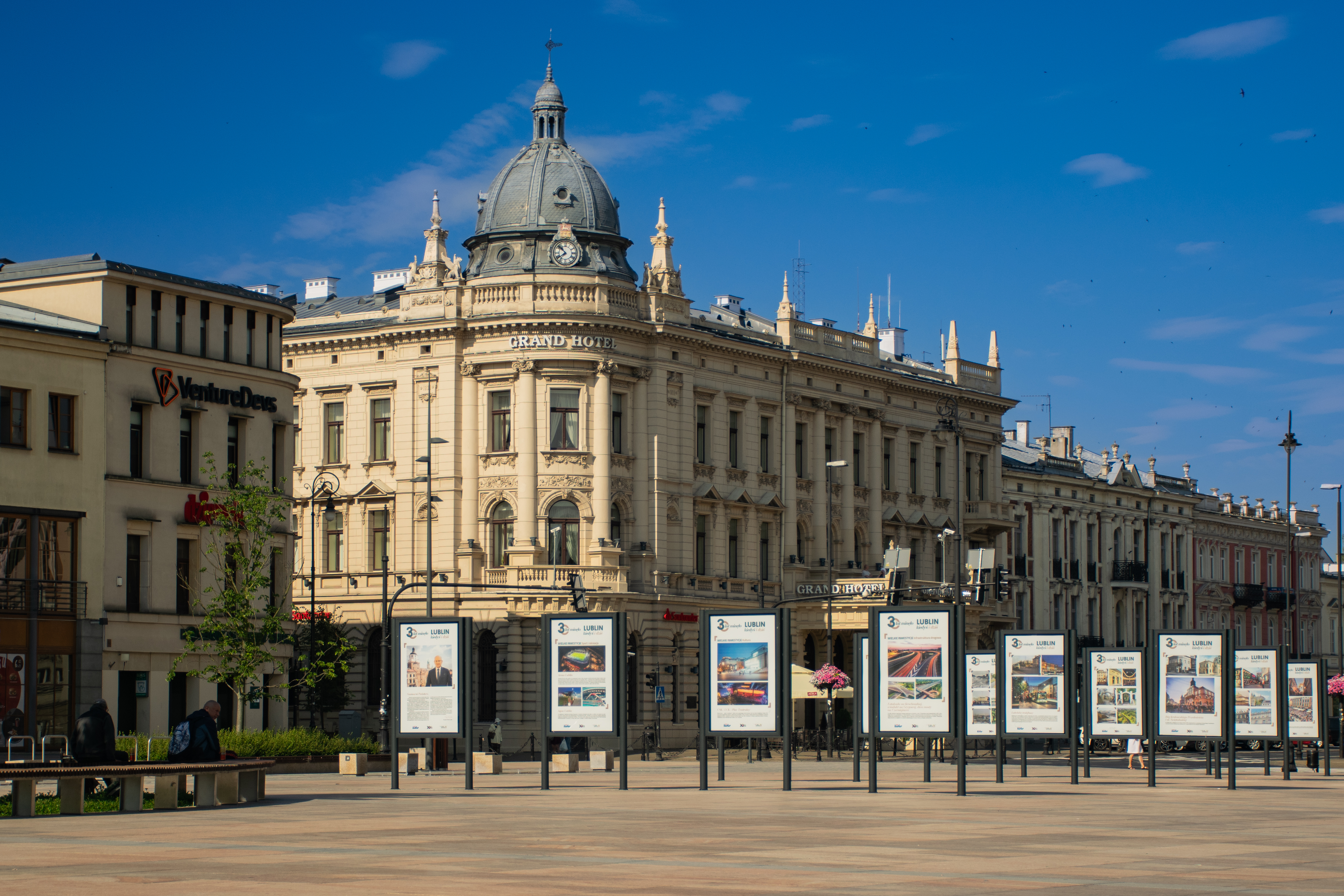
- View of Old Town New City Hall Market Square Castle Chapel Kraków Gate Cathedral Lithuanian Square

- Flag Coat of arms Brandmark
- Motto(s): Fidelitatem et Constantiam (in Latin); Wiernością i Stałością (in Polish)
- Location within Poland
- Coordinates: 51°15′N 22°34′E
- Country: Poland
- Voivodeship: Lublin
- Powiat: City County (Capital of Lublin County but not part of it)
- Established: before 12th century
- City rights: 1317
- City Hall: Lublin New Town Hall
- Districts: 27 boroughs

Government
  - City mayor: Krzysztof Żuk (PO)

Area
  - City county: 147 km^{2} (57 sq mi)

Population (31 December 2021)
  - City county: 336,339 ▼ (8th)
  - Density: 2,310/km^{2} (6,000/sq mi)
  - Metro: 664,000
- Demonym(s): Lublinianin (male); Lublinianka (female) (pl)
- Time zone: UTC+1 (CET)
  - Summer (DST): UTC+2 (CEST)
- Postal code: 20-001 to 20-999
- Area code: +48 81
- Car plates: LU
- Primary airport: Lublin Airport
- Website: www.lublin.eu/en

Historic Monument of Poland
- Official name: Lublin – historic architectural and urban ensemble
- Designated: 2007-04-25
- Reference no.: Dz. U. z 2007 r. Nr 86, poz. 574

Lublin (Note: Pronunciation: English: /ˈlʊblɪn/ LUUB-lin, US also /ˈluːblɪn/ LOO-blin; Polish: [ˈlublin]; German: [ˈlʊbliːn].; Latin: Lublinum.) is the eighth-largest city in Poland and the second-largest city of historical Lesser Poland. It is the capital and the centre of Lublin Voivodeship with a population of 336,339 (December 2021). Lublin is the largest Polish city east of the Vistula River, located 153 km (95 mi) southeast of Warsaw.

One of the events that greatly contributed to the city's development was the Polish–Lithuanian Union of Krewo in 1385. Lublin thrived as a centre of trade and commerce due to its strategic location on the route between Vilnius and Kraków; the inhabitants had the privilege of free trade in the Grand Duchy of Lithuania. The Lublin Parliament session of 1569 led to the creation of a real union between the Crown of the Kingdom of Poland and the Grand Duchy of Lithuania, thus creating the Polish–Lithuanian Commonwealth. Lublin witnessed the early stages of the Reformation in the 16th century. A Calvinist congregation was founded and groups of radical Polish Brethren (called Arians by their detractors) appeared in the city, making it an important global centre of Unitarianism.

Until the partitions at the end of the 18th century, Lublin was an important royal city of the Kingdom of Poland. Its delegates, alike nobles, had the right to participate in the royal election. In 1578, Lublin was chosen as the seat of the Crown Tribunal, the highest appeal court in the Polish–Lithuanian Commonwealth, and for centuries, the city has been flourishing as a centre of culture and higher learning.

In 2011, the analytical Financial Times Group found Lublin to be one of the best cities for business in Poland. The Foreign Direct Investment ranking placed Lublin second among larger Polish cities in the cost-effectiveness category. Lublin is noted for its green spaces and a high standard of living; the city has been selected as the 2023 European Youth Capital and 2029 European Capital of Culture. Its historical Old Town is one of Poland's national monuments (Pomnik historii) tracked by the National Heritage Board of Poland.

== History ==
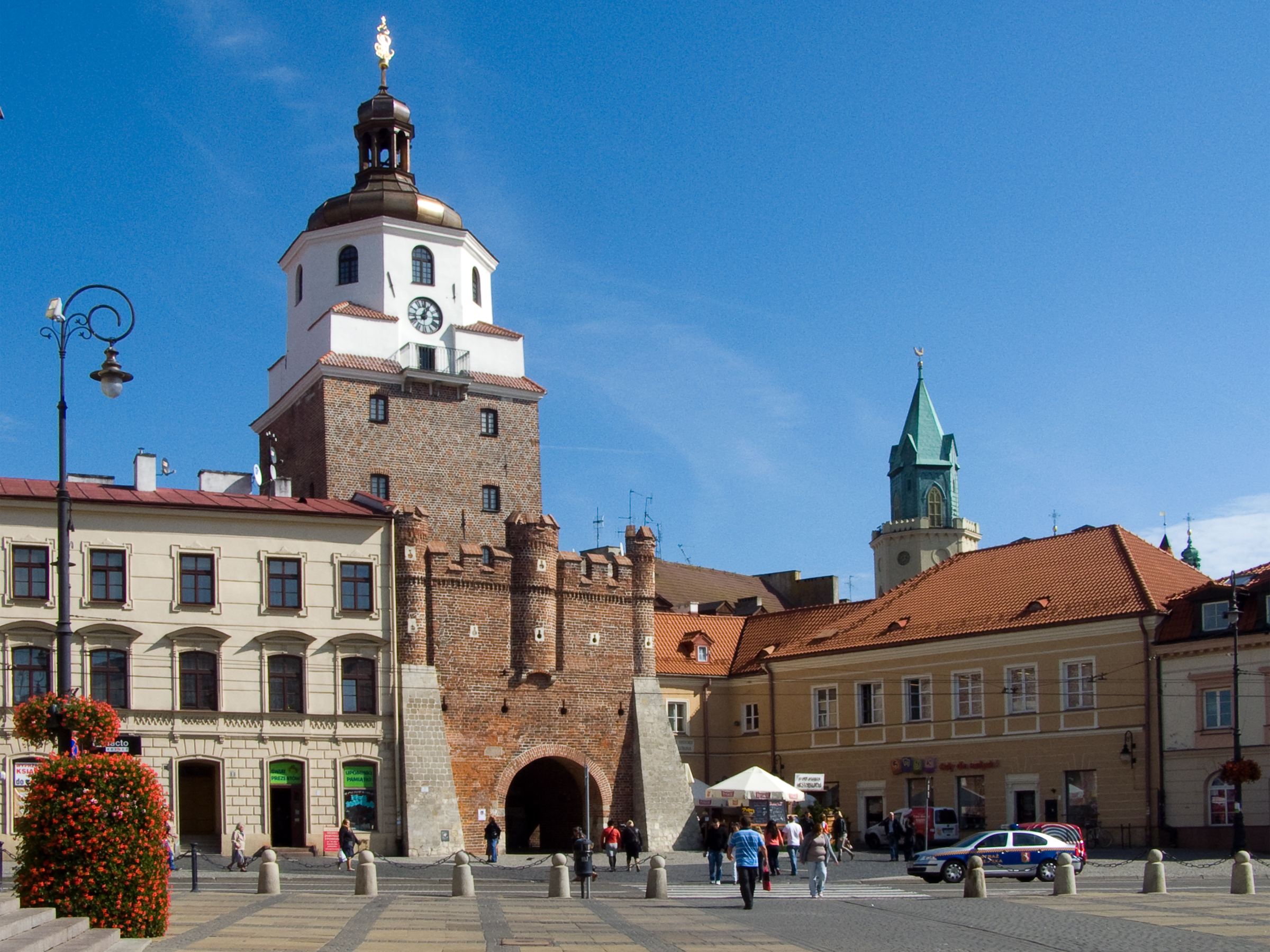
Kraków Gate in the Old Town is among the city's most recognisable landmarks.

Archaeological finds indicate a long presence of cultures in the area. A complex of settlements started to develop on the future site of Lublin and in its environs in the sixth to seventh centuries. Remains of settlements dating back to the sixth century were discovered in the centre of today's Lublin on Czwartek ("Thursday") Hill.

The early Middle Ages were marked by an intensified settlement of people, particularly in the areas along river valleys. The settlements were centred around the stronghold on Old Town Hill, which was likely one of the main centres of the Lendians, a Lechitic tribe. When the tribal stronghold was destroyed in the 10th century, the centre shifted to the northeast, to a new stronghold above Czechówka valley and, after the mid-12th century, to Castle Hill.

At least two churches are presumed to have existed in Lublin in the early medieval period. One of them was most probably erected on Czwartek Hill during the rule of Casimir the Restorer in the 11th century. The castle became the seat of a castellan, first mentioned in historical sources from 1224, but was quite possibly present from the start of the 12th or even 10th century. The oldest historical document mentioning Lublin dates from 1198, so the name must have come into general use some time earlier.

The location of Lublin at the eastern borders of the Polish lands gave it military significance. During the first half of the 13th century, Lublin was a target of attacks by Mongols, Tatars, Ruthenians, and Lithuanians, which resulted in its destruction. It was also ruled by Kingdom of Galicia–Volhynia between 1289 and 1302. Lublin was founded as a town by Władysław I the Elbow-high or between 1258 and 1279 during the rule of the prince Bolesław V the Chaste. Casimir III the Great, appreciating the site's strategic importance, built a masonry castle in 1341 and encircled the city with defensive walls. From 1326, if not earlier, the stronghold on Castle Hill included a chapel in honor of the Holy Trinity. A stone church dating to 1335–1370 exists to this day.

=== Jagiellonian Poland ===
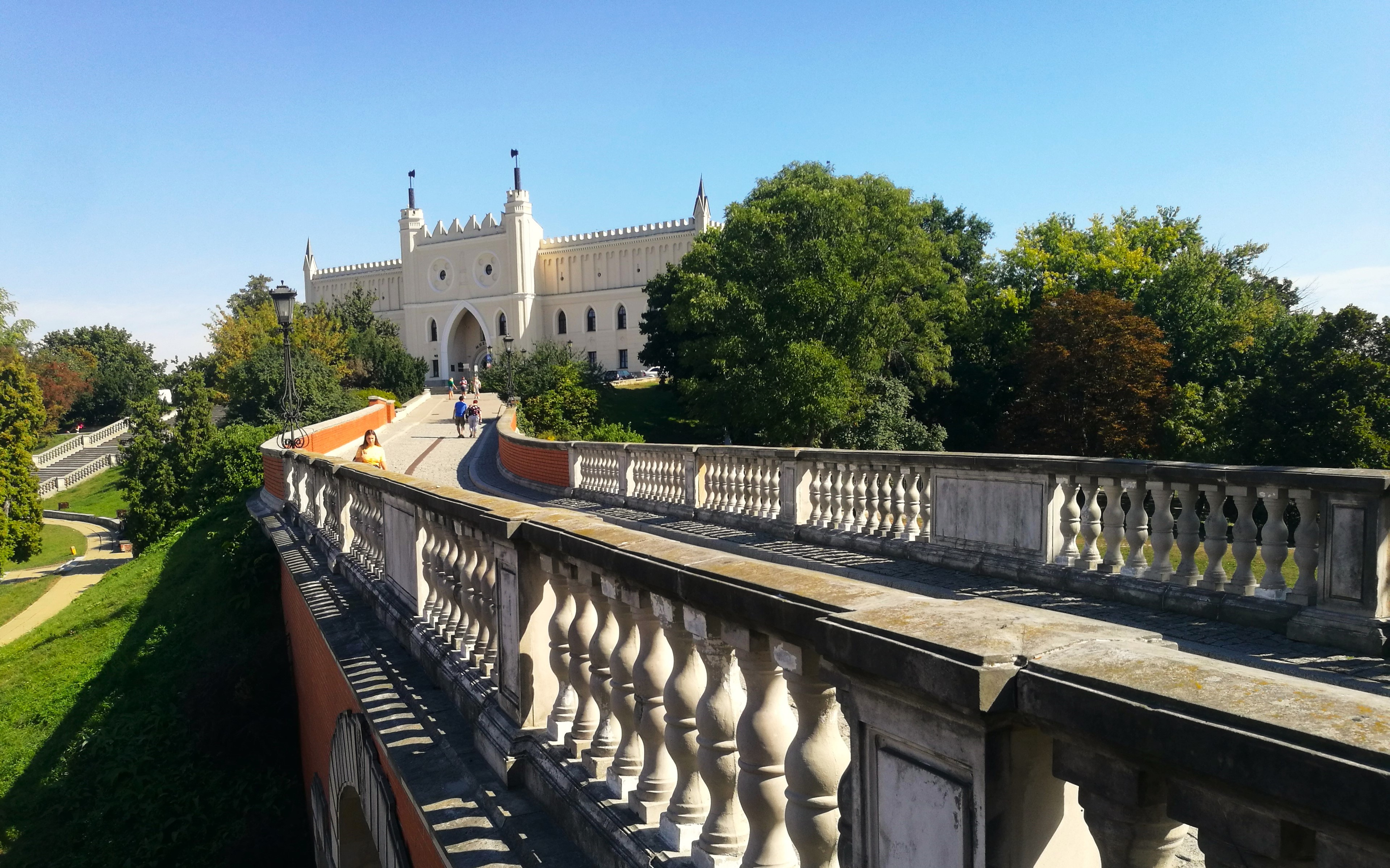
Neogothic façade of Lublin Castle

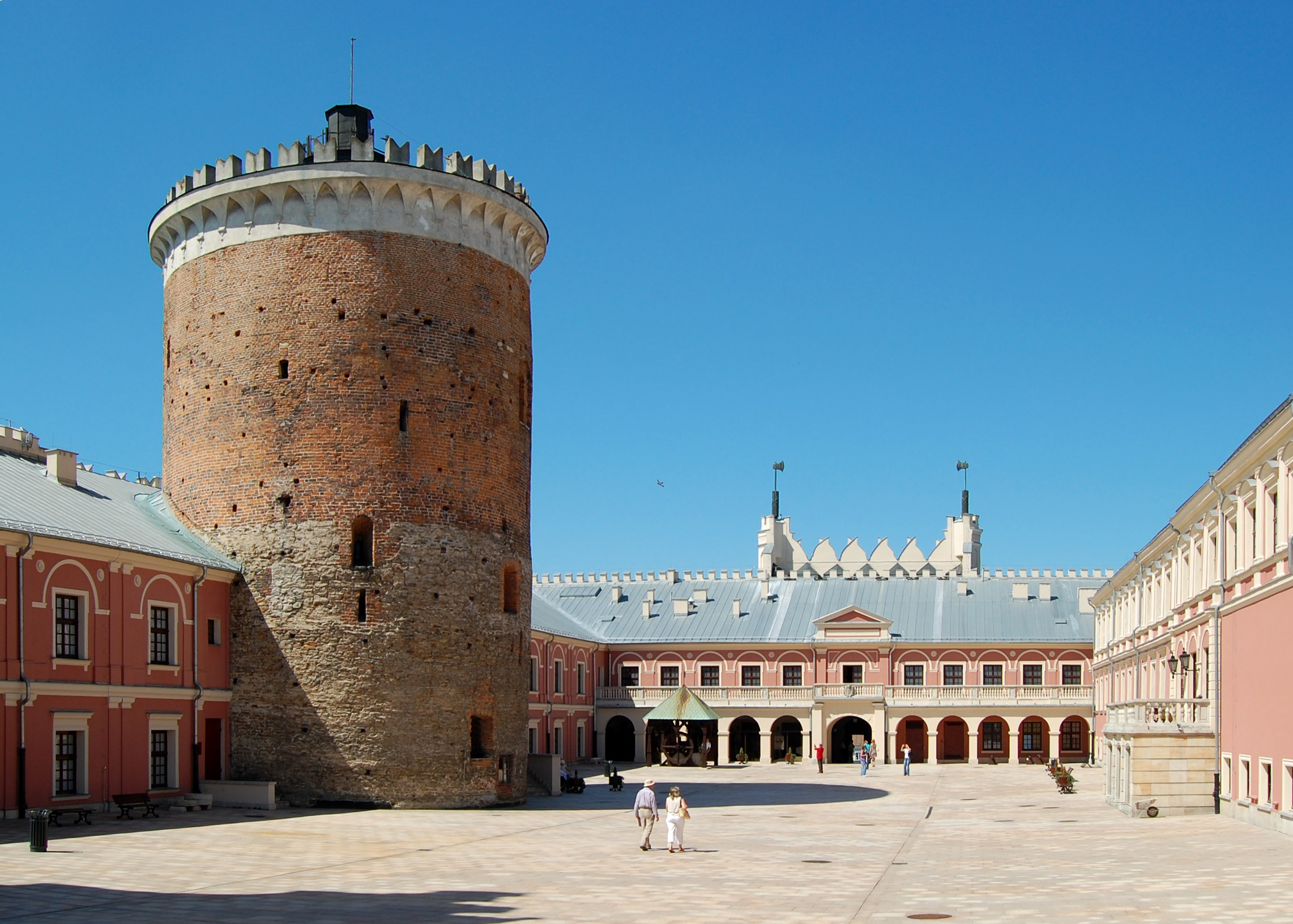
Castle courtyard with a fortified keep

In 1392, the city received an important trade privilege from the king Władysław II Jagiełło. With the coming of peace between Poland and Lithuania, it developed into a trade centre, handling a large portion of commerce between the countries. In 1474, the area around Lublin was carved out of Sandomierz Voivodeship and combined to form the Lublin Voivodeship, the third voivodeship of Lesser Poland.

During the 15th and 16th centuries, the town grew rapidly. The largest trade fairs of the Polish–Lithuanian Commonwealth were held in Lublin. In the 16th century, the parliaments (Sejm) of the Kingdom of Poland were held in Lublin several times. On 26 June 1569, one of the most important proclaimed the Union of Lublin, which united Poland and Lithuania. Lublin as one of the most influential cities of the state enjoyed voting rights during the royal elections in Poland.

Some of the artists and writers of the 16th century Polish renaissance lived and worked in Lublin, including Sebastian Klonowic and Jan Kochanowski, who died in the city in 1584. In 1578, the Crown Tribunal, the highest court of the Lesser Poland Province, was established in Lublin.

Since the second half of the 16th century, Protestant Reformation movements devolved in Lublin, and a large congregation of Polish Brethren was present in the city. One of Poland's most important Jewish communities was established in Lublin around this time. Jews established a widely respected yeshiva, Jewish hospital, synagogue, cemetery, and education centre (kahal) and built the Grodzka Gate (known as the Jewish Gate) in the historic district. Jews were a vital part of the city's life until the Holocaust, during which they were relocated by Nazi Germany to the infamous Lublin Ghetto and ultimately murdered.

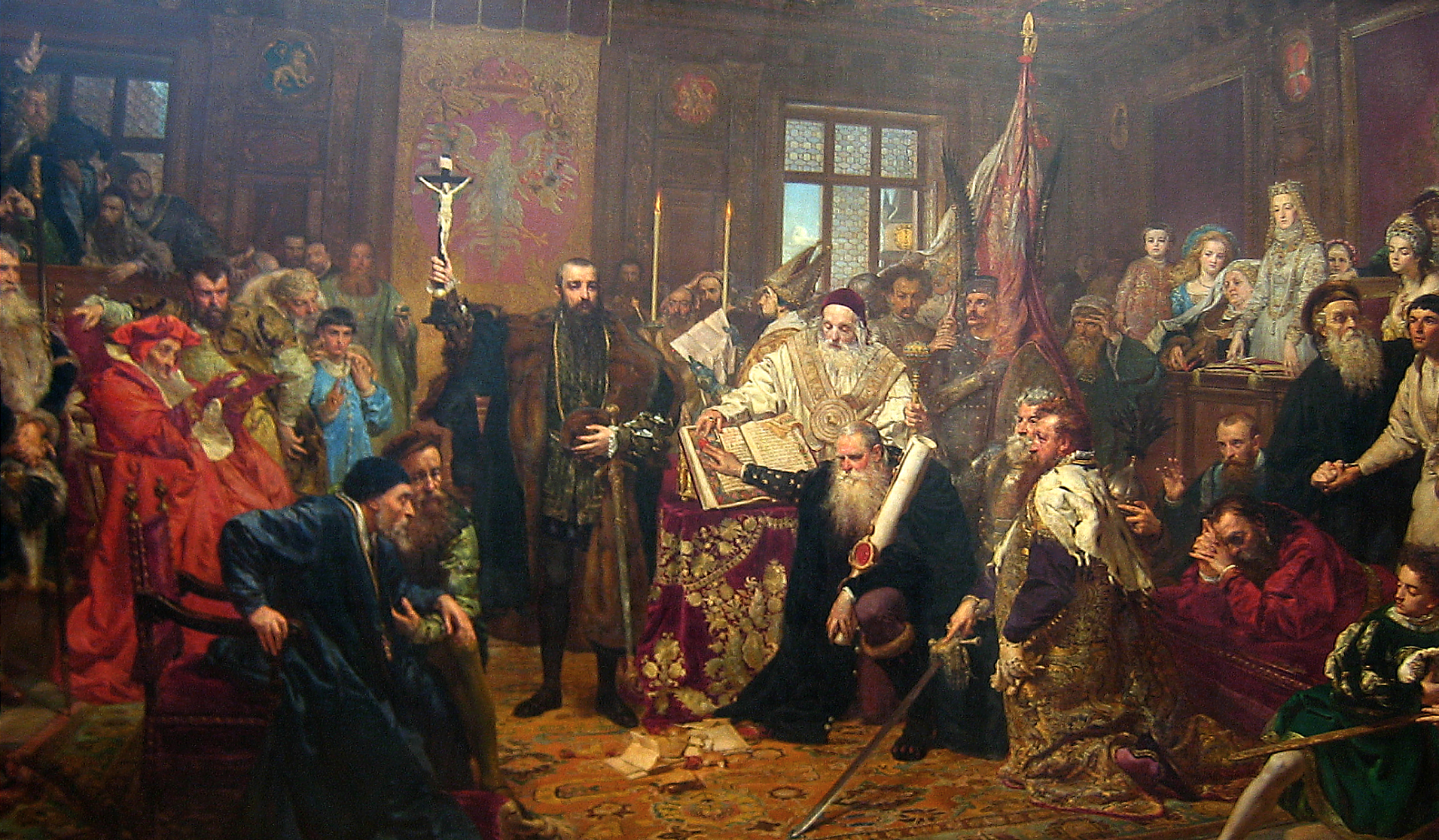
Union of Lublin, painting by Jan Matejko at the National Museum of Lublin

The yeshiva became a centre of learning of Talmud and Kabbalah, leading the city to be called "the Jewish Oxford". In 1567, the rosh yeshiva (headmaster) received the title of rector from the king along with rights and privileges equal to those of the heads of Polish universities.

The city declined due to the disastrous Deluge, when it was invaded by Russo-Cossack forces in 1655, and Sweden in 1656.

=== 19th and early 20th century ===
After the Third Partition of Poland in 1795, Lublin was located in the Austrian Empire, then following the Austro-Polish War of 1809 it was part of the short-lived Polish Duchy of Warsaw, and then in 1815 it became part of the Congress Poland in the Russian Partition of Poland.

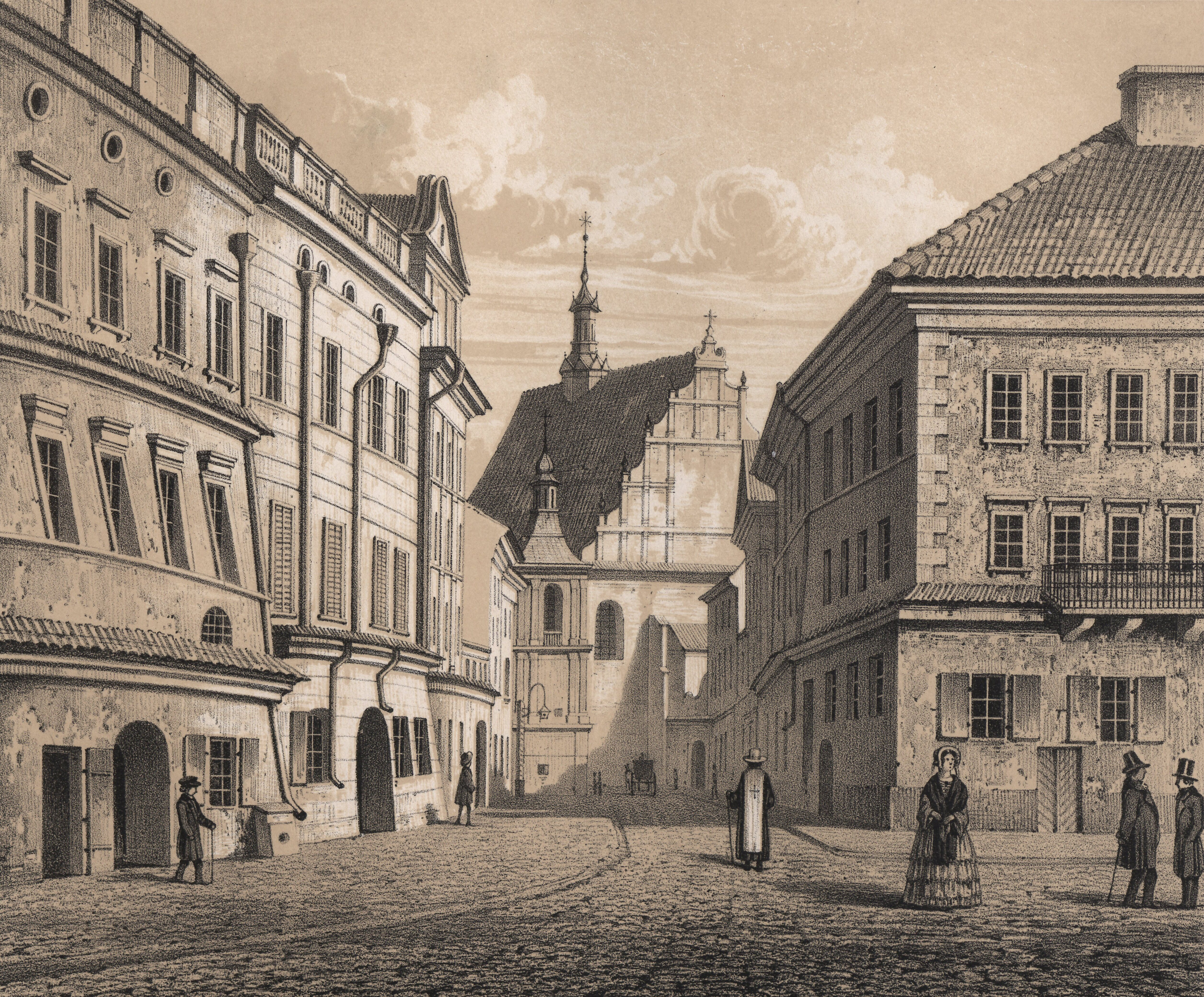
A 19th-century drawing of the Lublin's Old Town by Adam Lerue

At the beginning of the 19th century, new squares, streets, and public buildings were built. In 1877, a railway connection to Warsaw and Kovel and Lublin Station were constructed, spurring industrial development. Lublin's population grew from 28,900 in 1873 to 50,150 in 1897 (including 24,000 Jews).

Russian rule ended in 1915, when the city was occupied by German and Austro-Hungarian armies. After the defeat of the Central Powers in 1918, the Provisional People's Government of the Republic of Poland—the first government of independent Poland—operated in Lublin for a short time. In the interwar years, the city continued to modernise and its population grew; important industrial enterprises were established, including the first aviation factory in Poland, the Plage i Laśkiewicz works, later nationalised as the LWS factory. The Catholic University of Lublin was founded in 1918.

In 1921, Roman Catholics constituted 58.9% of the city's population, with Jews at 39.5%. In 1931, 63.7% of the inhabitants were Roman Catholic and 34.7% Jewish.

On 20 July 1931 a violent tornado carved a path of destruction through the city, destroying dozens of structures in downtown and killing six people. This tornado is officially rated F4 on the Fujita scale; however, the Polish Weather Service estimated winds at 246 to 324 mph (396 to 521 km/h), potentially ranking it as an F5.

=== World War II ===
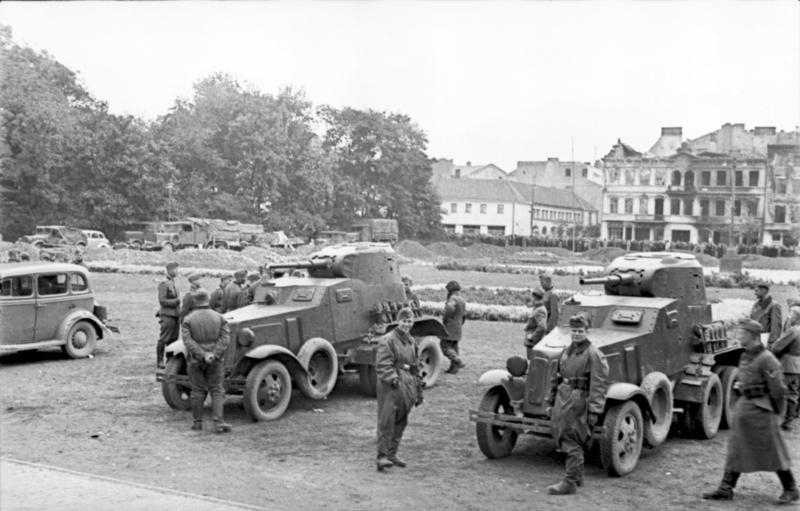
German and Soviet troops in Lublin during the invasion of Poland in September 1939

In early September 1939, during the joint German-Soviet invasion of Poland, which started World War II, the Polish government evacuated a portion of the Polish gold reserve from Warsaw to Lublin, and then further east to Łuck, before the city was occupied by Germany, and found itself in the newly formed General Government territory. The Polish population became a target of severe Nazi persecutions focusing on intelligentsia and Polish Jews. In November 1939, during the Intelligenzaktion, the Germans carried out mass arrests of hundreds of Poles, including teachers, judges, lawyers, engineers, priests, lecturers of the local theological seminary, and lecturers and students of the Catholic University of Lublin, which the occupiers closed down. Arrested Poles were held in a prison established in the Lublin Castle, and many were afterwards deported to concentration camps.

On 23–25 December 1939, the Germans carried out massacres of 31 Poles in several locations in Lublin. Among the victims were lawyers, professors, school principals, starosts of Lublin and Lubartów counties and other well-known and respected citizens of the region. In January and February 1940, the occupiers arrested 23 Capuchin friars and 43 Jesuit friars. Persecution of Polish intelligentsia was continued with the AB-Aktion. On 24 June 1940, the Germans carried out mass arrests of over 800 Poles in Lublin, who were then imprisoned in the castle, along with dozens of Poles who were arrested at the same time in other towns in the region, including Biała Podlaska, Chełm, Puławy. Many of the prisoners were then deported to the Sachsenhausen and Auschwitz concentration camps, while around 500 Poles were murdered in five large massacres carried out in the present-day district of Rury in 1940. Among the victims of the massacres were both men and women: doctors, engineers, local officials, lawyers, judges, activists, military officers, parliamentarians, Polish resistance members, policemen, teachers and school and university students.

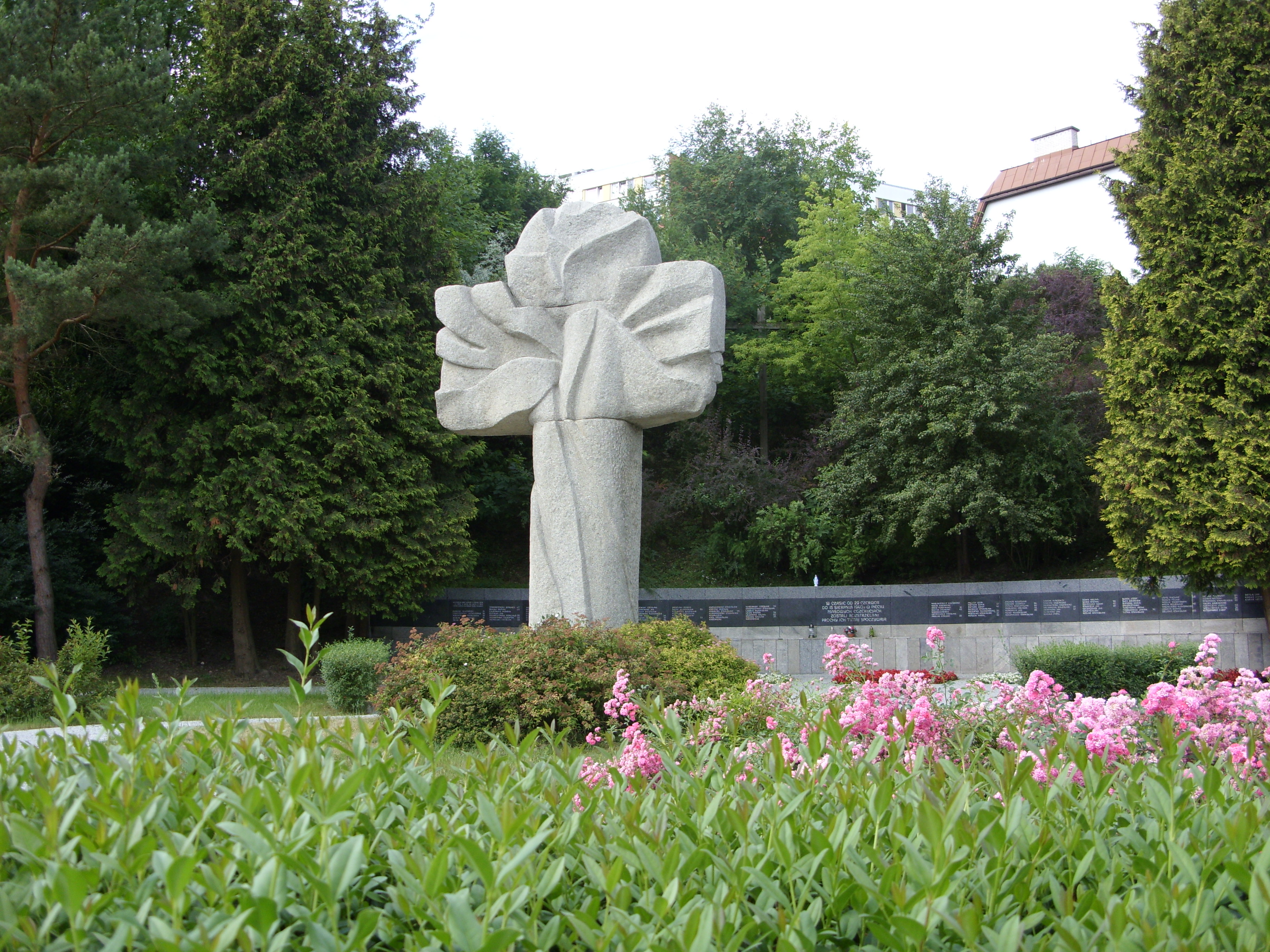
Monument and cemetery in Rury where the Germans massacred around 500 Poles in 1940

An attempt to "Germanise" the city led to an influx of the ethnic Volksdeutsche, increasing the number of German minority from 10–15% in 1939 to 20–25%. Near Lublin, the so-called "reservation" for the Jews was built based on the idea of racial segregation known as the "Nisko or Lublin Plan".

The Germans established and operated a Baudienst forced labour camp for Poles in Lublin. Many Poles from or associated with Lublin, including 94 lecturers, alumni and students of the Catholic University of Lublin were murdered by the Soviets in the large Katyn massacre in April–May 1940.

The Jewish population was forced into the newly established Lublin Ghetto. The city served as headquarters for Operation Reinhardt, the main German effort to exterminate all Jews in occupied Poland. The majority of the ghetto inmates, about 26,000 people, were deported to the Bełżec extermination camp between 17 March and 11 April 1942. The remainder were moved to facilities around the Majdanek concentration camp established at the outskirts of the city. Almost all of Lublin's Jews were murdered during the Holocaust in Poland. The secret Polish Council to Aid Jews "Żegota", established by the Polish resistance movement operated in the city. There are also known cases of local Polish men and women, who were captured and sent to either forced labour or concentration camps by the Germans for sheltering and aiding Jews. Poles who saved Jews in other places in the region were also temporarily imprisoned in the local castle, before being sent to the Auschwitz concentration camp.

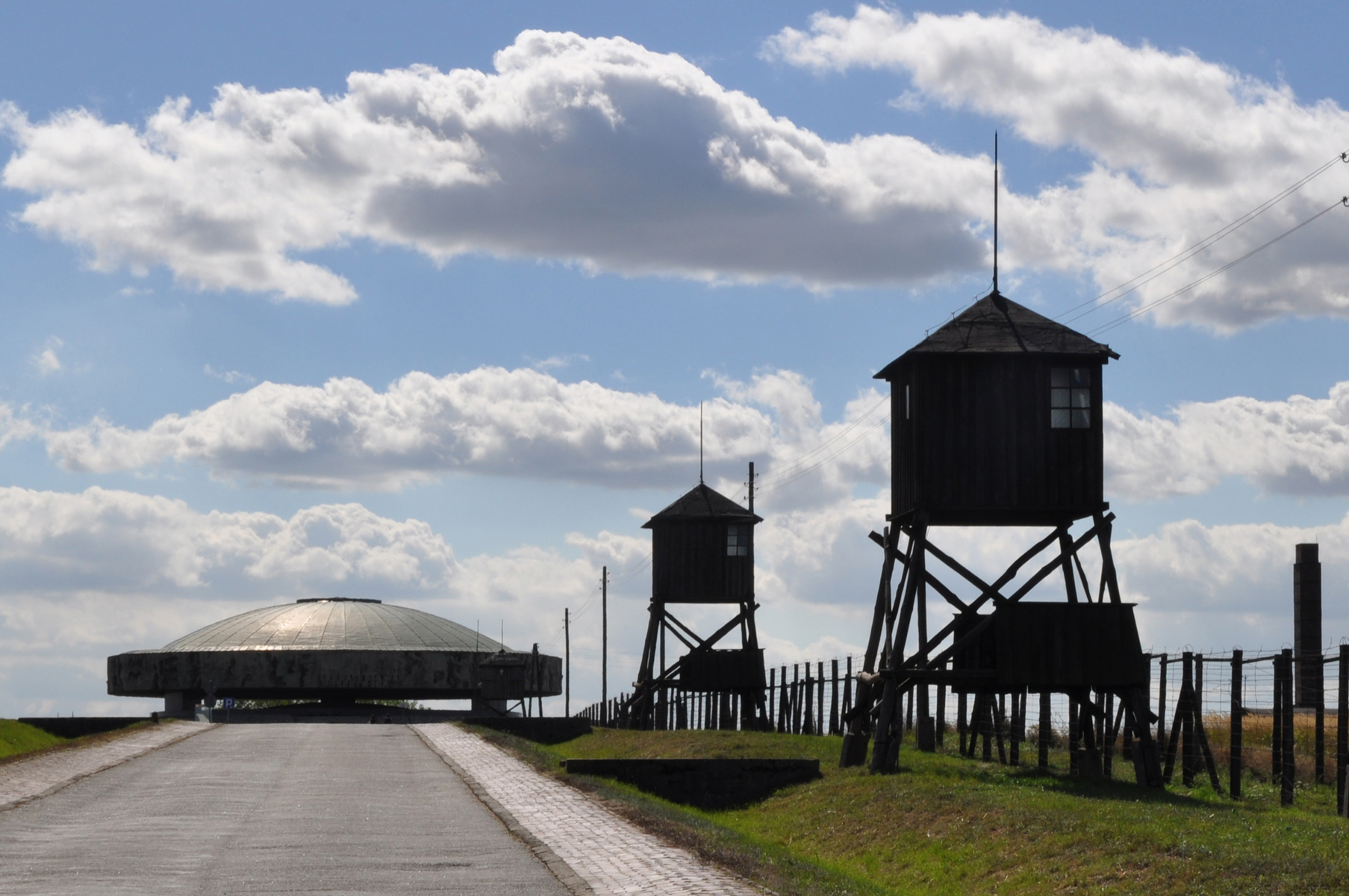
The site of the former Majdanek concentration camp, located on the outskirts of Lublin

After the war, some survivors emerged from hiding with the Christian rescuers or returned from the Soviet Union, and re-established a small Jewish community in the city, but their numbers were insignificant. Most survivors left Poland for Israel, the United States and other countries.

In the first years of the occupation, many expelled Poles from Gdańsk and German-annexed Pomerania were deported to Lublin, and later on, in 1943, around 9,000 expelled Poles from the nearby Zamojszczyzna region were brought to Lublin and imprisoned in the Majdanek concentration camp and in a transit camp at Krochmalna Street; many were afterwards deported to forced labour in Germany. In August 1943, thanks to efforts of the Polish Rada Główna Opiekuńcza charity organisation, around 2,200 people were released from those two camps. Many of the released people, including hundreds of kidnapped Polish children, were extremely exhausted or sick, and were taken to local hospitals, which quickly became overcrowded. Many exhausted children died soon. Lublin pharmacists and residents organized help for the children, and after leaving the hospital, the people were taken in by the inhabitants of the surrounding villages, which resulted in an epidemic typhus outbreak, which caused many deaths among the population.

On 24 July 1944, the city was taken by the Soviet Army and became the temporary headquarters of the Soviet-controlled communist Polish Committee of National Liberation established by Joseph Stalin, which was to serve as the basis for a puppet government. The Soviets carried out arrests of Polish resistance members, including the regional delegate of the Polish government-in-exile, Władysław Cholewa, and the commander of the regional branch of the Home Army, Colonel Kazimierz Tumidajski, who was eventually killed in Russian captivity in 1947. The capital of new Poland was moved to Warsaw in January 1945 after the Soviet westward offensive.

=== Post-war period ===
In the postwar years, Lublin continued to grow, tripling its population and greatly expanding its area. A considerable scientific and research base was established around the newly founded Maria Curie-Skłodowska University. A large automotive factory, Fabryka Samochodów Ciężarowych (FSC), was built in the city. In 2017, the city was awarded the Europe Prize by the Parliamentary Assembly of the Council of Europe for having made exceptional efforts to spread the ideal of European unity.

== Geography ==
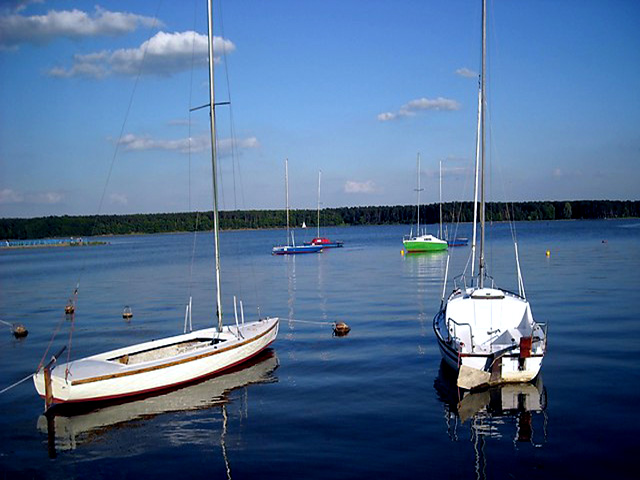
Zemborzyce Lake

Lublin lies in eastern Poland on the Lublin Upland. The Bystrzyca river, a tributary of the Wieprz river, passes through the city and divides it into two parts: western, with a more varied relief with loess gorges, and eastern, which is flat. In the southern part of the city there is an artificial Zemborzyce Lake created by damming Bystrzyca.

The area of the city is 147 km2. The highest point lies at a height of 235.0 m (771.0 ft) and the lowest point at a height of 163.6 m (537 ft).

Lublin has a humid continental climate (Köppen Dfb) with cold, damp winters and warm summers.

Climate data for Lublin (1991–2020, extremes 1951–present)
Month	Jan	Feb	Mar	Apr	May	Jun	Jul	Aug	Sep	Oct	Nov	Dec	Year
Record high °C (°F)	12.3 (54.1)	16.9 (62.4)	23.1 (73.6)	29.3 (84.7)	35.7 (96.3)	38.0 (100.4)	35.4 (95.7)	37.0 (98.6)	33.8 (92.8)	26.6 (79.9)	19.6 (67.3)	14.8 (58.6)	38.0 (100.4)
Mean daily maximum °C (°F)	−0.1 (31.8)	1.6 (34.9)	6.6 (43.9)	13.8 (56.8)	19.1 (66.4)	22.4 (72.3)	24.5 (76.1)	24.3 (75.7)	18.6 (65.5)	12.5 (54.5)	6.1 (43.0)	1.2 (34.2)	12.6 (54.7)
Daily mean °C (°F)	−2.5 (27.5)	−1.4 (29.5)	2.4 (36.3)	8.6 (47.5)	13.6 (56.5)	16.9 (62.4)	18.9 (66.0)	18.4 (65.1)	13.4 (56.1)	8.2 (46.8)	3.2 (37.8)	−1.0 (30.2)	8.2 (46.8)
Mean daily minimum °C (°F)	−4.9 (23.2)	−4.2 (24.4)	−1.1 (30.0)	3.8 (38.8)	8.4 (47.1)	11.7 (53.1)	13.6 (56.5)	13.1 (55.6)	9.0 (48.2)	4.6 (40.3)	0.8 (33.4)	−3.3 (26.1)	4.3 (39.7)
Record low °C (°F)	−33.7 (−28.7)	−30.6 (−23.1)	−24.2 (−11.6)	−7.3 (18.9)	−4.1 (24.6)	0.2 (32.4)	4.1 (39.4)	0.8 (33.4)	−3.8 (25.2)	−7.7 (18.1)	−20.6 (−5.1)	−24.5 (−12.1)	−33.7 (−28.7)
Average precipitation mm (inches)	33.6 (1.32)	31.5 (1.24)	37.9 (1.49)	42.3 (1.67)	70.7 (2.78)	66.8 (2.63)	82.2 (3.24)	54.9 (2.16)	62.8 (2.47)	47.4 (1.87)	36.5 (1.44)	34.5 (1.36)	601.0 (23.66)
Average extreme snow depth cm (inches)	9.2 (3.6)	10.8 (4.3)	8.1 (3.2)	3.0 (1.2)	0.0 (0.0)	0.0 (0.0)	0.0 (0.0)	0.0 (0.0)	0.0 (0.0)	0.8 (0.3)	4.0 (1.6)	6.2 (2.4)	10.8 (4.3)
Average precipitation days (≥ 0.1 mm)	17.10	15.01	14.83	12.50	13.43	13.17	14.07	10.93	11.97	13.07	14.47	16.33	166.88
Average snowy days (≥ 0 cm)	18.8	17.8	9.6	1.5	0.0	0.0	0.0	0.0	0.0	0.6	4.8	14.4	67.5
Average relative humidity (%)	87.9	85.5	78.7	70.5	72.9	74.5	74.4	73.4	80.1	84.5	89.0	89.5	80.1
Mean monthly sunshine hours	44.5	70.3	127.5	187.7	253.1	262.8	263.2	246.4	166.2	116.5	52.8	30.3	1,821.3
Source 1: Meteomodel.pl
Source 2: Meteomodel.pl (records, relative humidity 1991–2020)

== Administration ==
Districts of Lublin

Lublin is the capital of the province called Lublin Voivodeship, a province (voivodeship) created in 1999. The city is a separate urban gmina and city county (powiat).

=== Municipal government ===
Lublin is governed by the municipal legislature known as the city council (Rada Miasta) and the city's mayor (Prezydent Miasta). The city council is made up of 31 councillors directly elected by the city's inhabitants. The remit of the council and president extends to all areas of municipal policy and development planning, up to and including the development of local infrastructure, transport, and planning permission. The city's current mayor is Krzysztof Żuk, who has served in this position since 2010.

=== Symbols ===
Lublin has an official flag, a 5:8 rectangle divided into three horizontal stripes: white (top), green (narrow, middle), and red (bottom). In the central part, there is the coat of arms of Lublin. It is also allowed to hang the flag in the form of a vertical ribbon: then white should be on the left side or near the spar.

=== Districts ===
Lublin is divided into 27 administrative divisions (dzielnica): Abramowice, Bronowice, Czechów Południowy, Czechów Północny, Czuby Południowe, Czuby Północne, Dziesiąta, Felin, Głusk, Hajdów-Zadębie, Kalinowszczyzna, Konstantynów, Kośminek, Ponikwoda, Rury, Sławin, Sławinek, Stare Miasto, Szerokie, Śródmieście, Tatary, Węglin Południowy, Węglin Północny, Wieniawa, Wrotków, Za Cukrownią, and Zemborzyce.

== Demographics ==
Historical population
Year	Pop.	±%
1950	116,629	—
1960	183,400	+57.3%
1970	238,500	+30.0%
1978	290,420	+21.8%
1988	345,758	+19.1%
2002	357,110	+3.3%
2011	349,103	−2.2%
2021	334,681	−4.1%
2024	328,300	−1.9%

The population of Lublin at the end of 2024 was 328,300.

== Economy and infrastructure ==
The Lublin region is a part of eastern Poland, which has benefited less from the economic transformation after 1989 than regions of Poland located closer to Western Europe. Despite the fact that Lublin is one of the closest neighbour cities for Warsaw, the investment inflow in services from the Polish capital has secured a steady growth due to relatively fast connection, while external investments are progressing, enabling nearby satellite municipality Świdnik for large-scale industrial investments.

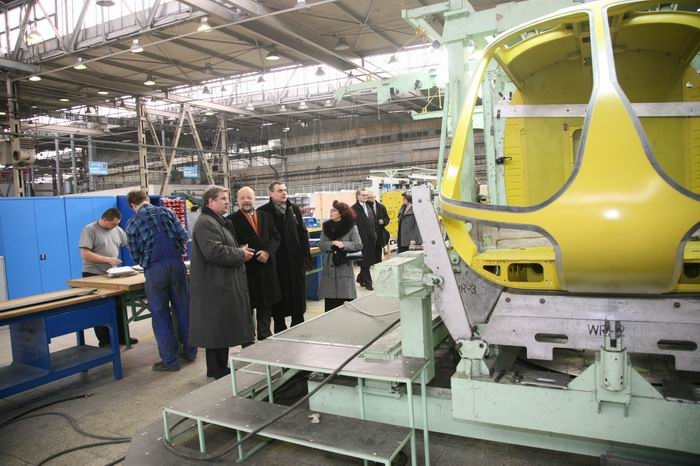
Polish MPs in the PZL-Świdnik helicopter factory

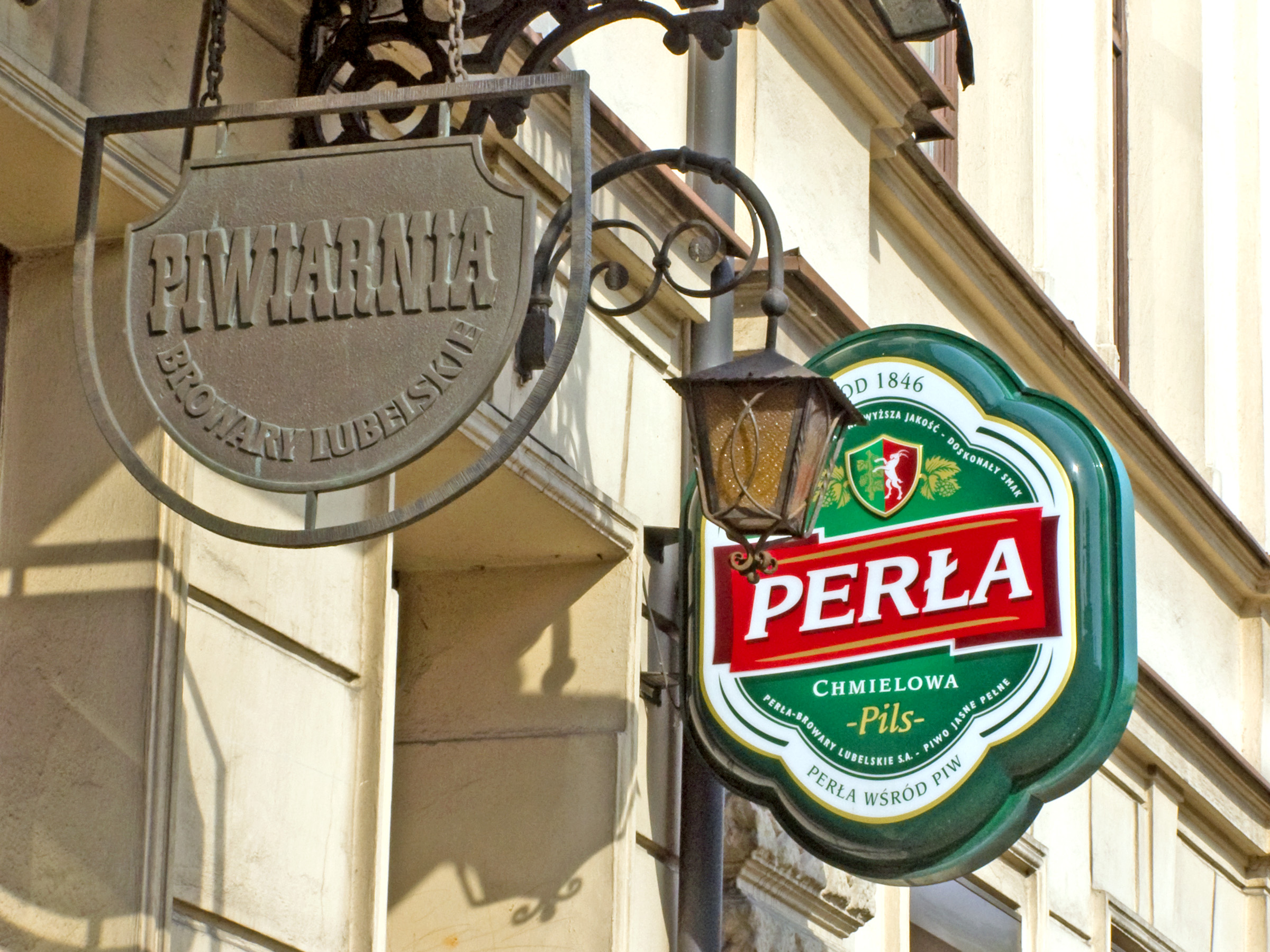
Perła – Browary Lubelskie

Lublin is a regional centre of IT companies. Asseco Business Solutions S.A., eLeader Sp z o.o., CompuGroup Medical Polska Sp. z o.o., Abak-Soft Sp. z o.o. and others have their headquarters here. Other companies (for example Comarch S.A., Britenet Sp. z o.o., Simple S.A., Asseco Poland S.A.) outsourced to Lublin, to take advantage of the educated specialists. There is a visible growth in professionals eager to work in Lublin, due to reasons like quality of life, culture management, the environment, improving connection to Warsaw, levels of education, or financial, because of usually higher operating margins of global organisations present in the area.

The large car factory Fabryka Samochodów Ciężarowych (FSC) was acquired by the South Korean Daewoo conglomerate in the early 1990s. With Daewoo's financial troubles in 1998 related to the Asian financial crisis, the production at FSC practically collapsed and the factory entered bankruptcy. Efforts to restart its van production succeeded when the engine supplier bought the company to keep its prime market. With the decline of Lublin as a regional industrial centre, the city's economy has been reoriented toward service industries. Currently, the largest employer is the Maria Curie-Sklodowska University.

The price of land and investment costs are lower than in western Poland. However, the Lublin area has to be one of the main beneficiaries of the EU development funds. Jerzy Kwiecinski, the deputy secretary of state in the Ministry for Regional Development at the Conference of the Ministry for Regional Development (Poland in the European Union — new possibilities for foreign investors) said:

In the immediate financial outlook, between 2007 and 2013, we will be the largest beneficiaries of the EU — every fifth Euro will be spent in Poland. In total, we will have at our disposal 120 billion EUR, assigned exclusively for post-development activities. This sum will be an enormous boost for our country.

In September 2007, the prime minister signed a bill creating a special economic investment zone in Lublin that offers tax incentives. It is part of "Park Mielec" — the European Economic Development area. At least 13 large companies had declared their wish to invest here, e.g., Carrefour, Comarch, Safo, Asseco, Aliplast, Herbapol, Modern-Expo, and Perła Browary Lubelskie. At the same time, the energy conglomerate, Polska Grupa Energetyczna, which will build Poland's first nuclear power station, is to have its main offices in Lublin.

Modern shopping centers built in Lublin like Tarasy Zamkowe (Castle Terraces), Lublin Plaza, Galeria Olimp, Galeria Gala, the largest shopping mall in the city, covering 33,500 square meters of area. Similar investments are planned for the near future such as Park Felin (Felicity) and a new underground gallery ("Alchemy") between and beneath Świętoduska and Lubartowska Streets.

=== Media ===
The local TVP station, TVP3 Lublin, broadcasts from a 104 m (341 ft)-tall concrete television tower. The station put its first program on the air in 1985. In recent years it contributed programming to TVP3 channel and later TVP Info.

The radio stations airing from Lublin include Radio 'eR – 87.9 FM', Radio 'Eska Lublin' – 103.6 FM, Radio Lublin (regional station of the Polish Radio) – 102.2 FM, [ Radio Centrum (university radio station)] – 98.2 FM, Radio 'Free' (city station of the Polish Radio) – 89,9 FM, and Radio 'Złote Przeboje' (Golden Hits) Lublin – 95.6 FM.

Local newspapers include Kurier Lubelski daily, regional partner of the national newspaper Dziennik Wschodni daily, Gazeta Wyborcza [ Lublin Edition] daily (regional supplement to the national newspaper Gazeta Wyborcza), [ Metro] (daily, free), and Nasze Miasto Lublin weekly (free).

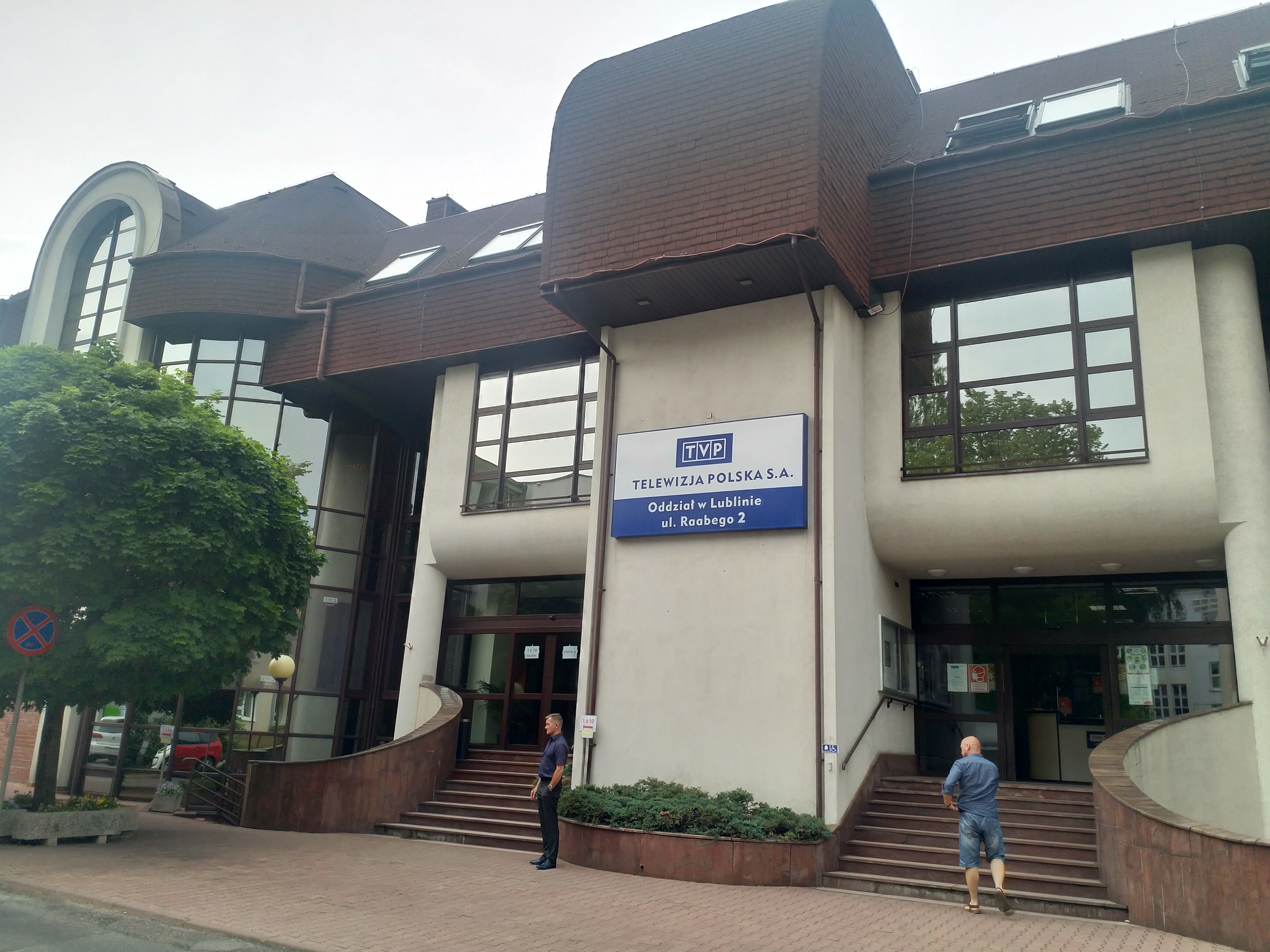
TVP3 Lublin headquarters

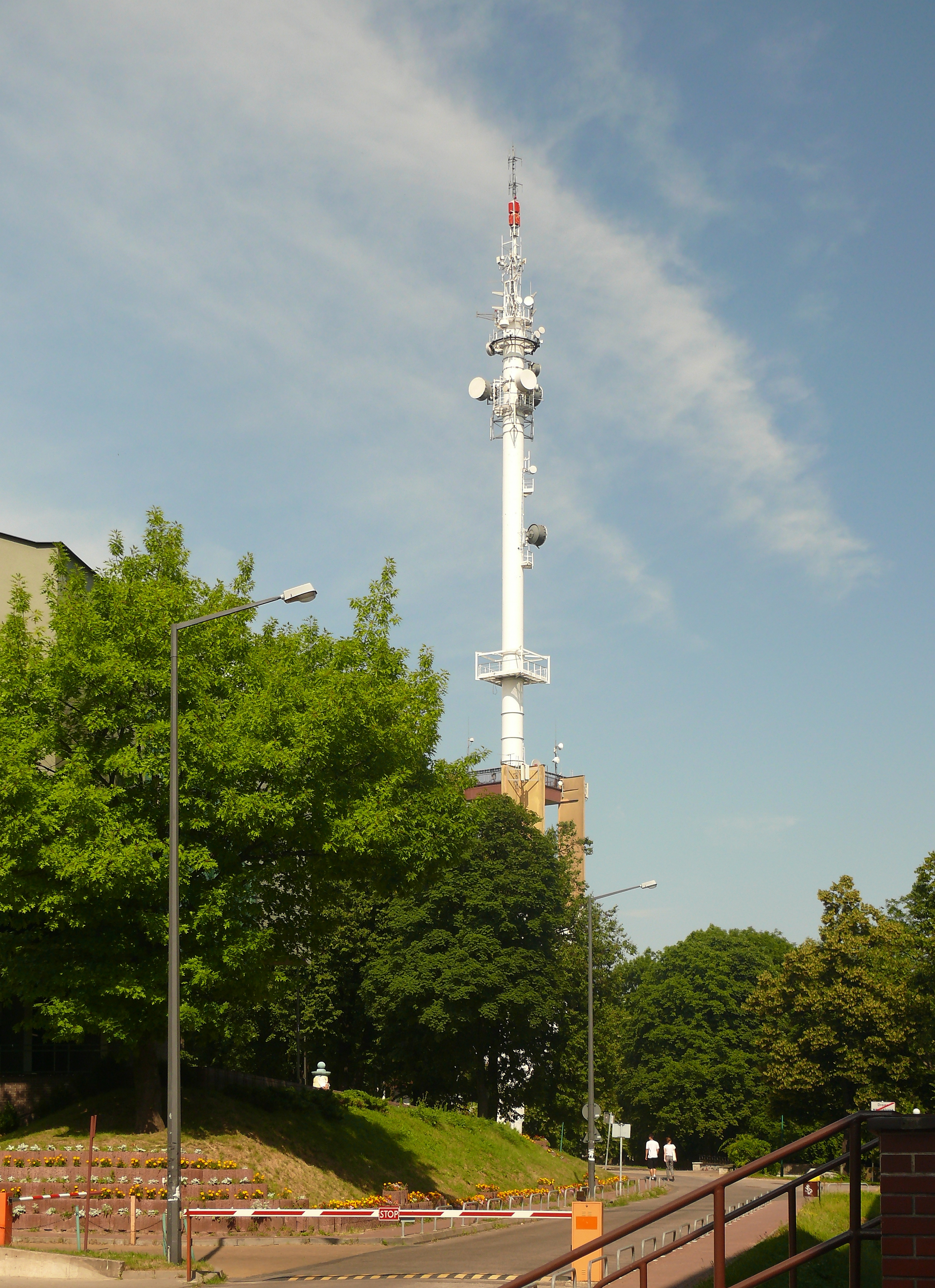
Radio Lublin transmitter tower

=== Transport ===
==== Airport ====
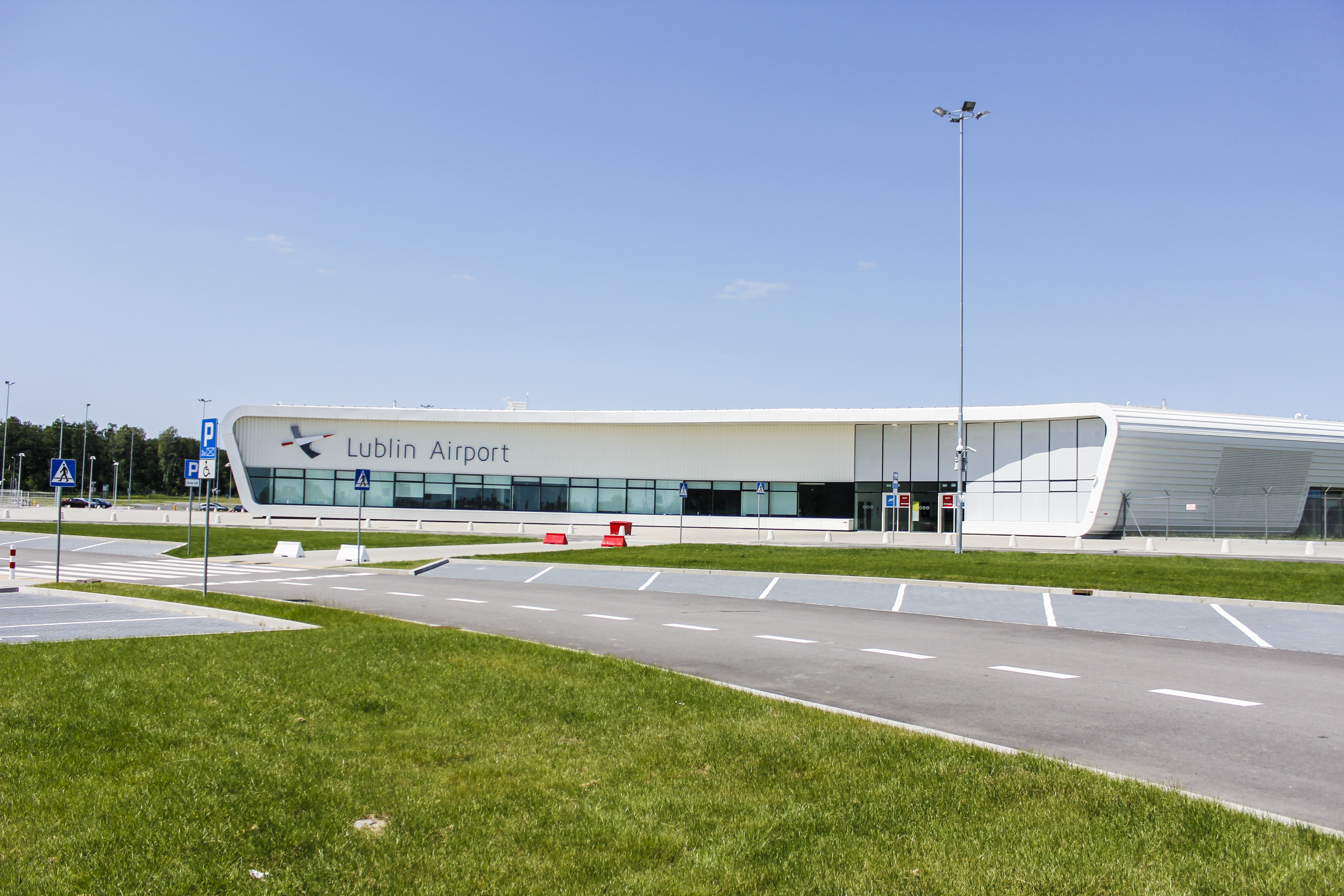
Lublin Airport

The Lublin Airport (Port Lotniczy Lublin) (IATA: LUZ) is located about 10 km (6.2 miles) SE of Lublin. With approximately 8 destinations and over 450 000 passengers served in 2018, it is the biggest airport in Eastern Poland. There is a direct train and bus link from the airport to downtown.

==== Railways ====
From Lublin Główny railway station, ten trains depart each day to Warsaw, and three to Kraków, as in other major cities in Poland. Lublin has also direct train connections with Rzeszów, Szczecin, Gdynia, and other Polish cities and towns in the region as Nałęczów, Chełm or Zamość. The express train to Warsaw takes about two hours.

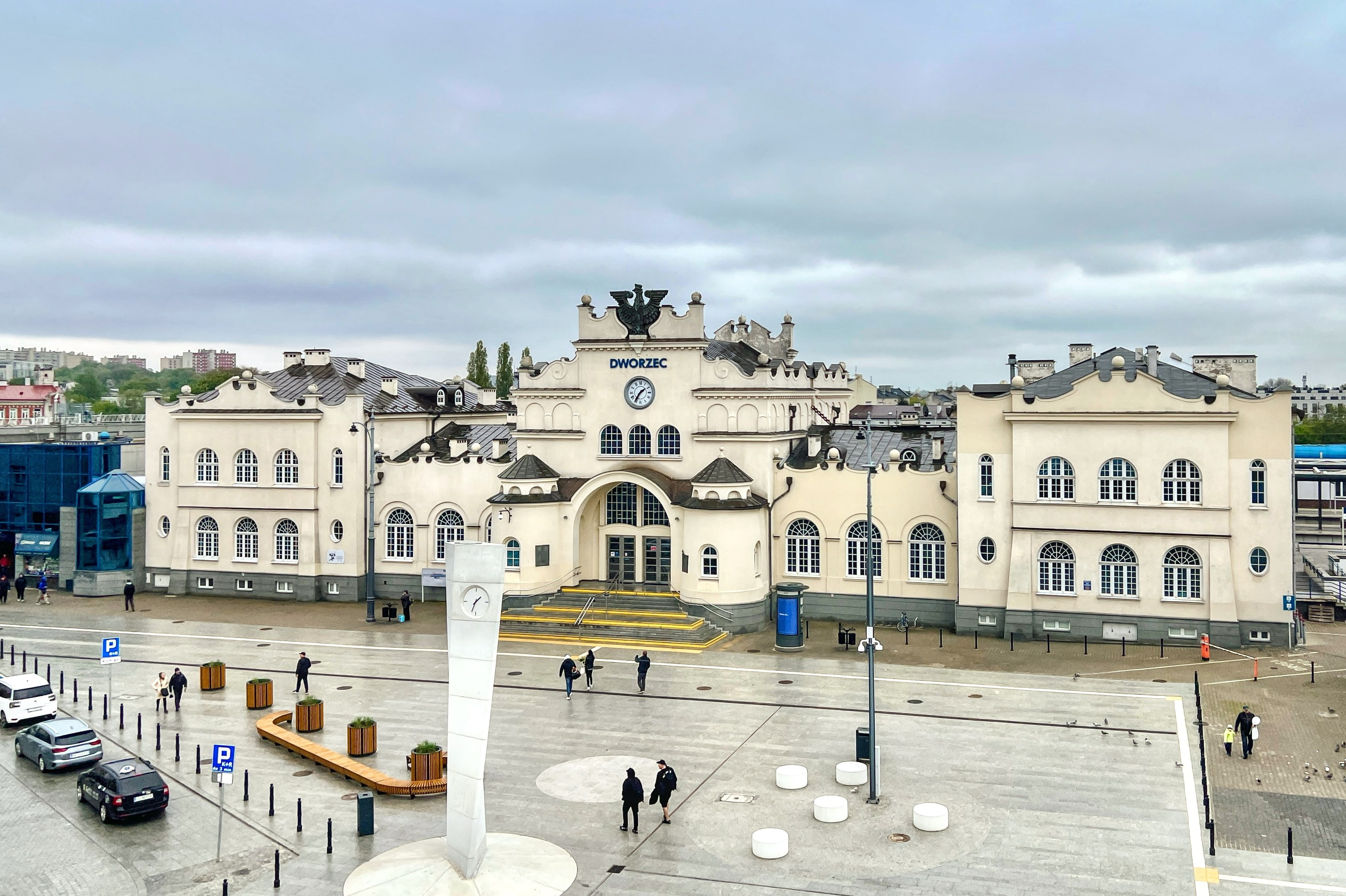
Lublin Główny railway station, the city's main train station

There are other smaller stations in Lublin for local trains:

- Lublin Ponikwoda railway station
- Lublin Północny railway station
- Lublin Zemborzyce railway station
- Lublin Zadębie railway station
- Lublin Zachodni railway station
- Stasin Polny railway station
- Rudnik Przystanek railway station

==== Roads ====
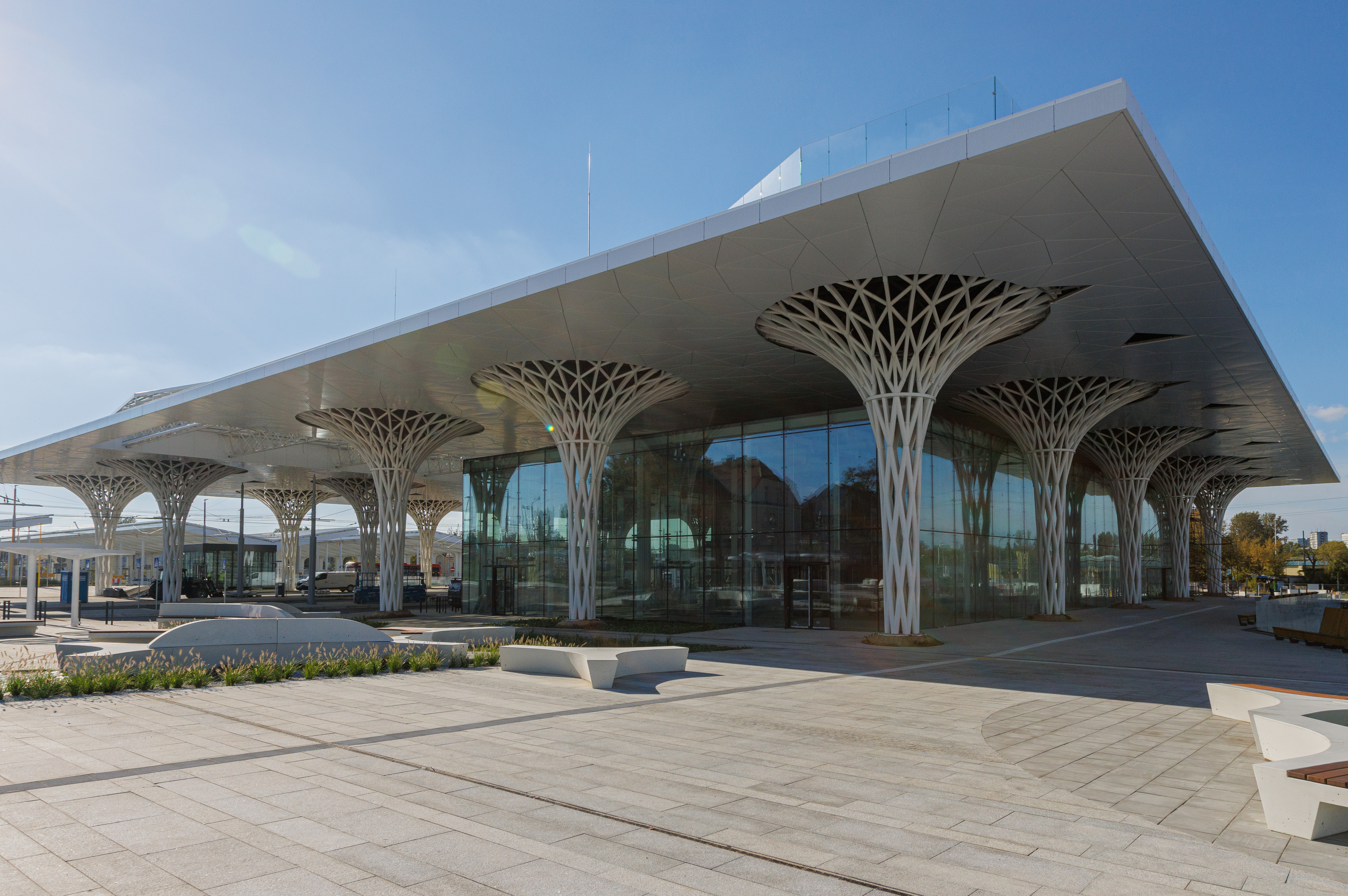
Lublin Metropolitan Station is aimed at connecting metropolitan, regional, and national transport.

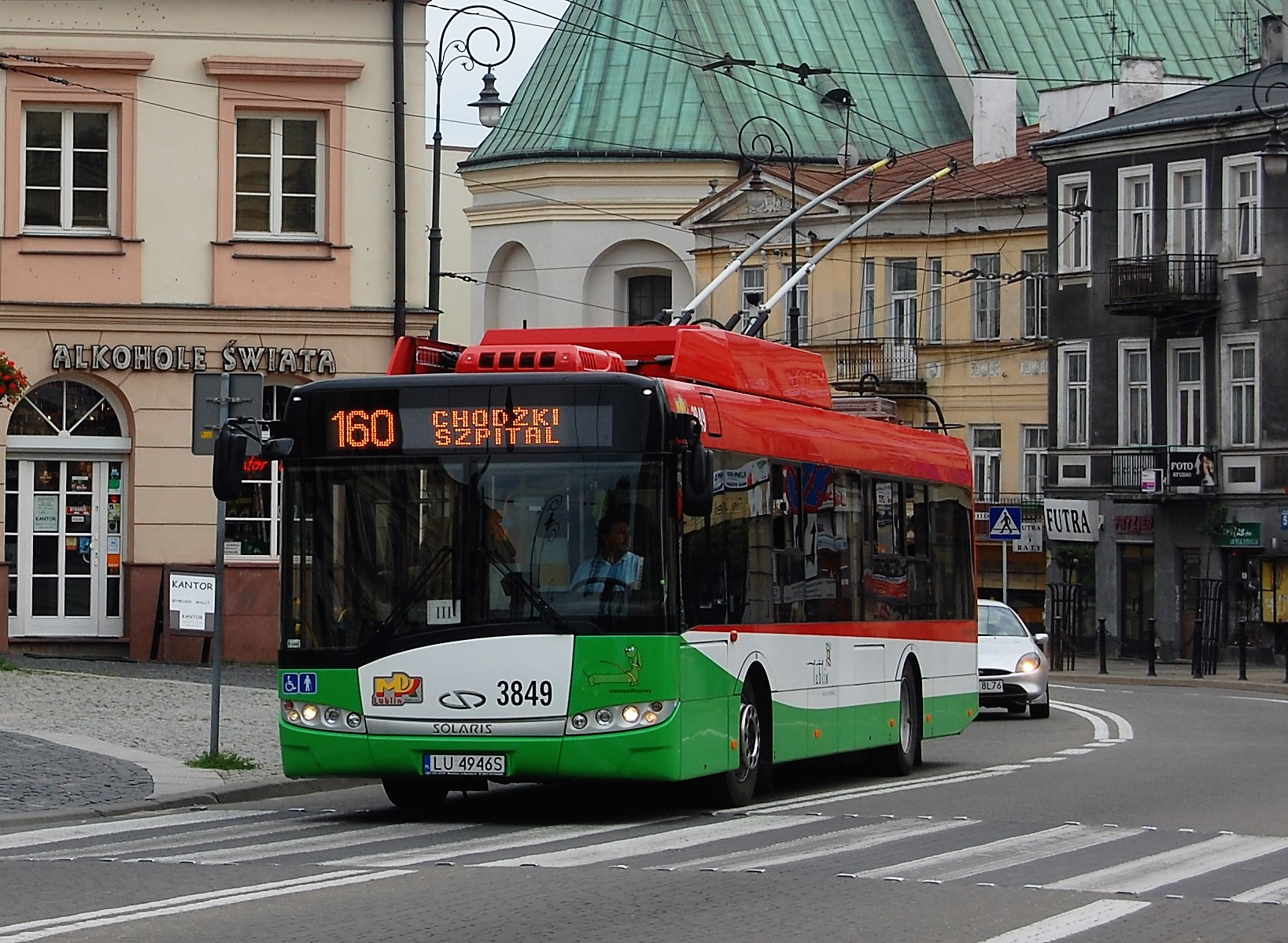
Lublin has one of three trolleybus systems in Poland.

Lublin is located at the intersection of expressways S12, S17, and S19. Expressway S17 between Lublin and Warsaw was completed in 2020. S19 between Lublin and Rzeszów was largely finished in 2022. The rest of the planned expressway network around the city, that will be built in the coming years, consists of S12 to the east in the direction Chełm, S19 north towards Białystok, and S17 southeast towards Zamość. The expressway bypass of Lublin allows transit traffic to avoid the city centre.

Long-distance buses depart from near the Castle in the Old Town and serve most of the same destinations as the rail network.

Lublin is one of only three cities in Poland to have trolleybuses (the others are Tychy and Gdynia - with some lines reaching Sopot).

Lublin is the largest city in Poland to not have a tram network.

== Culture and tourism ==
Lublin is the largest city in eastern Poland and serves as an important regional cultural capital. Since then, many important international events have taken place here, involving international artists, researchers and politicians.

=== Architecture ===
Lublin's Old Town shares several traditions with Lesser Poland, mostly the dialect and historic architecture that brings a unique ambience comparable with Kraków. It is, however, a distinct experience, which benefits from artistic renovation, that progressed somehow slower and focusing more on quality and less on commercialization. Historic buildings, including ruined townhouses that await for new owners, create a unique atmosphere of the renaissance city. Lublin's Old Town has cobbled, narrow streets and a mostly medieval layout and design. Many venues around Old Town enjoy an architecture applicable for restaurants, art hotels, pubs galleries, and clubs. Apart from entertainment, the area houses small businesses and prestigious offices.

There are several historic churches in the Old Town, including the Holy Trinity Chapel in Lublin Castle with the frescos, that are a mixture of Roman Catholic motifs with eastern Byzantine styles, reinforcing how the city connects the west with the east. Other important churches are the Late Gothic Virgin Mary Victorious Church, Renaissance Dominican Basilica and Bernardine church as well as Baroque St. John the Baptist Cathedral.

Monuments of the 20th-century architecture include the Chachmei Lublin Yeshiva and its synagogue, socialist-realist Zamkowy Square and brutalist Słowacki housing estate by Oskar Hansen.

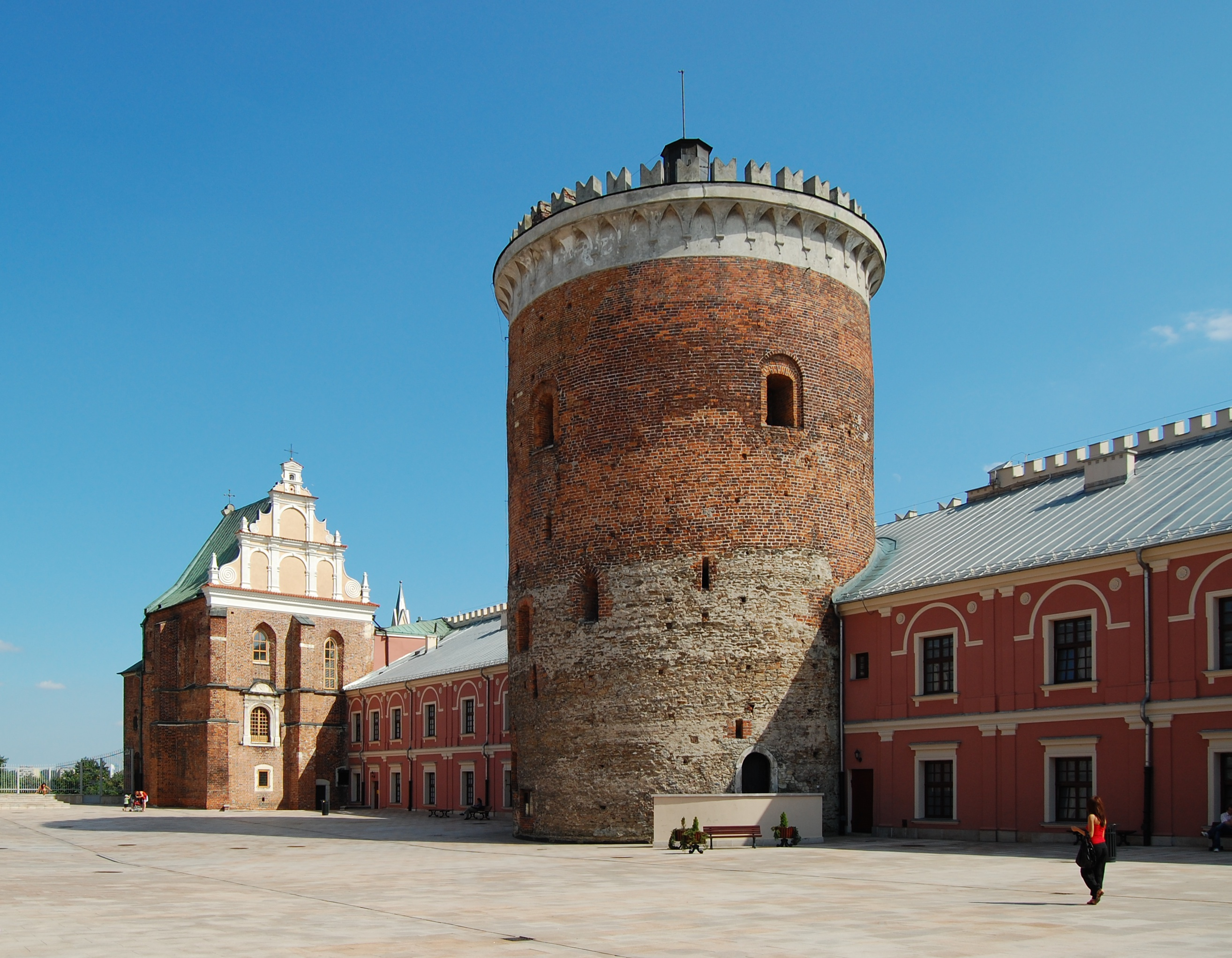
Lublin Castle, keep, and Holy Trinity Chapel

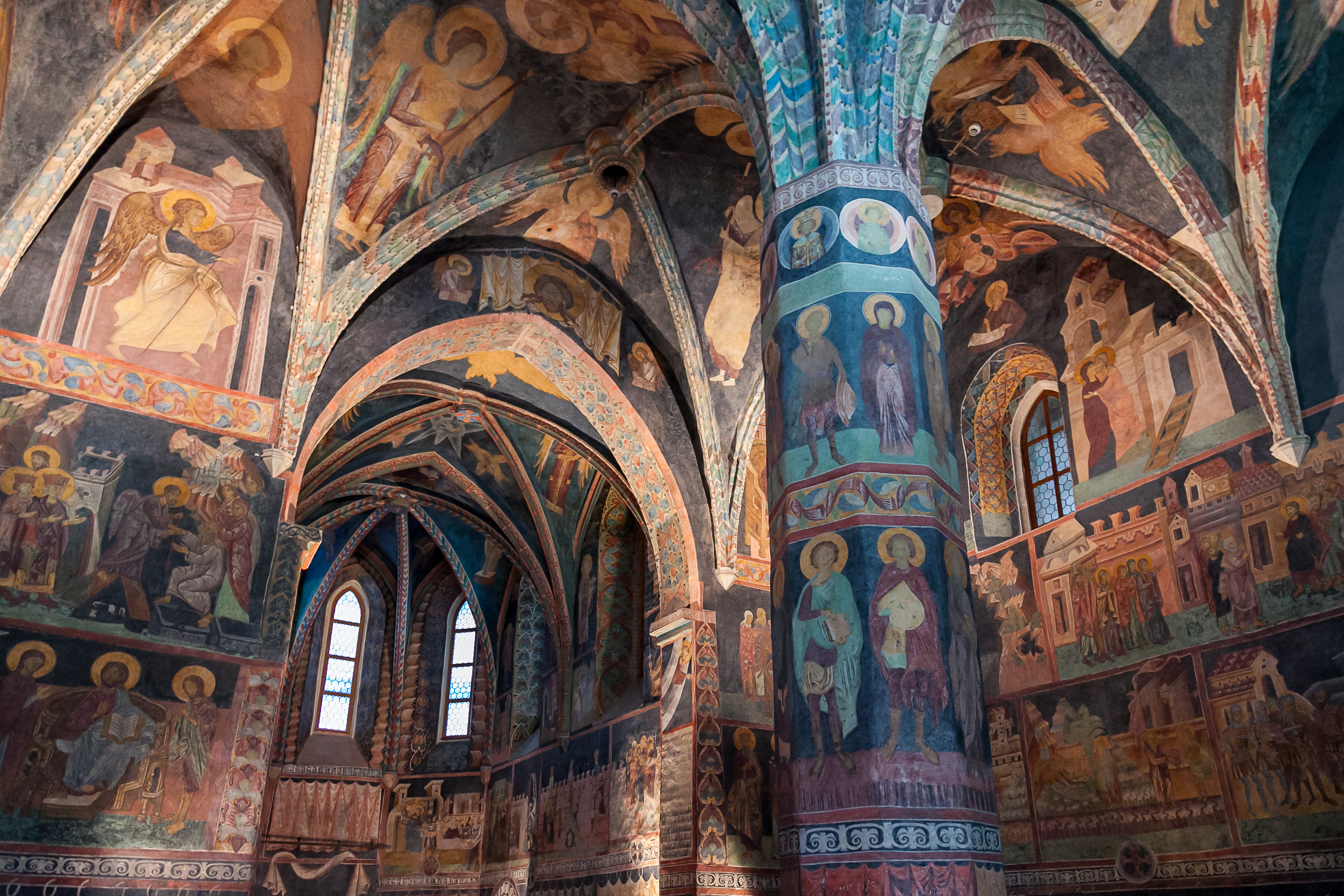
Frescoes inside the Holy Trinity Chapel

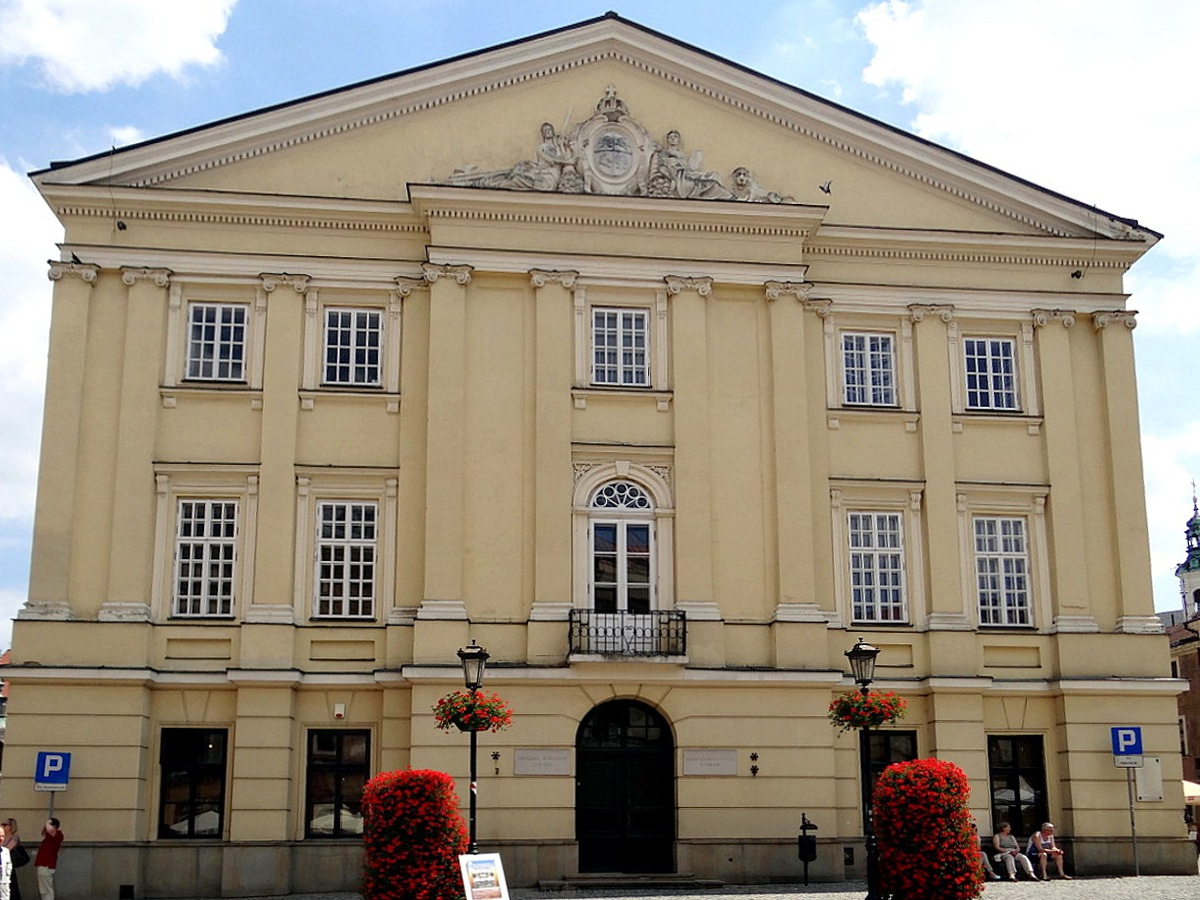
Crown Tribunal at the Market Square

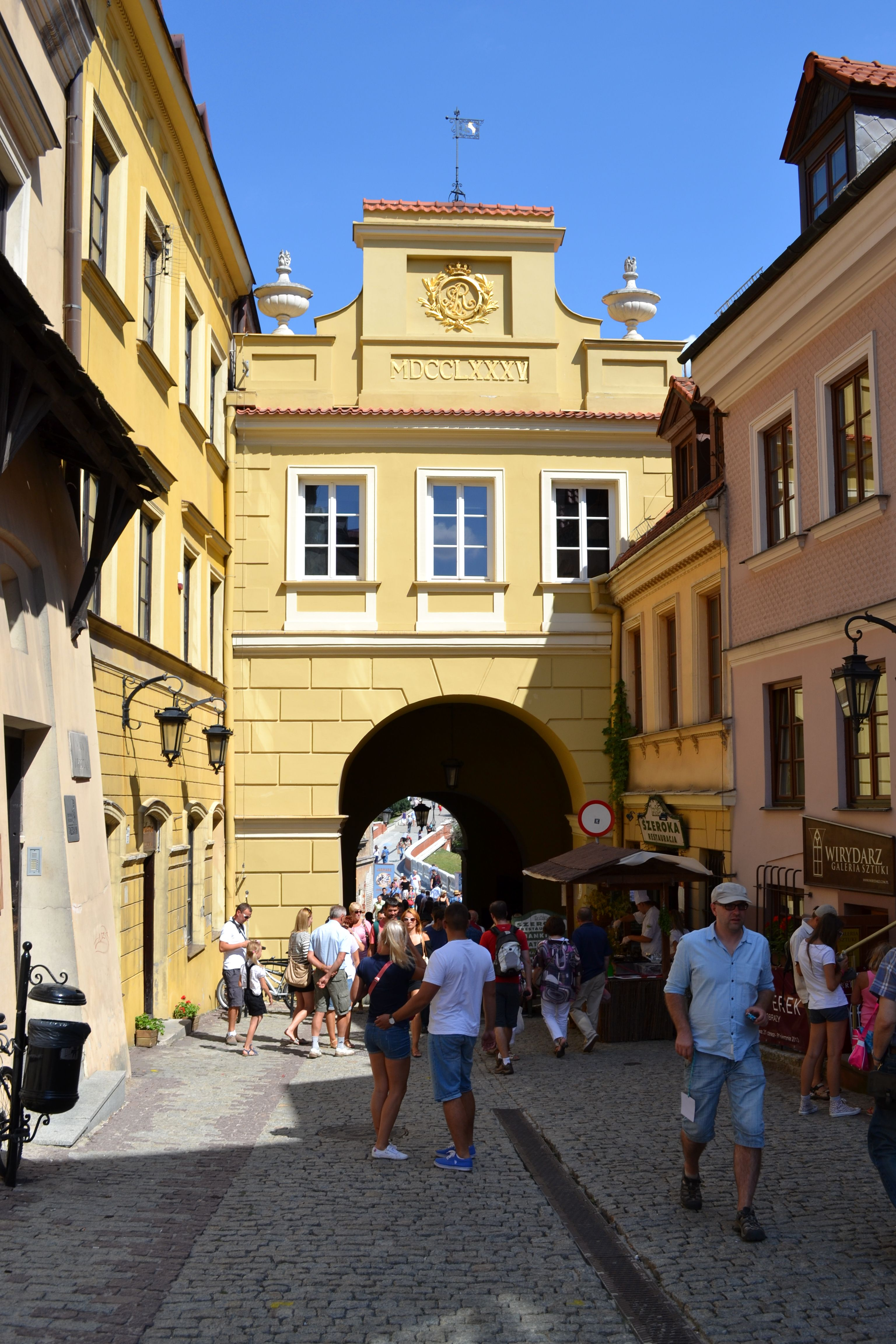
Grodzka Gate

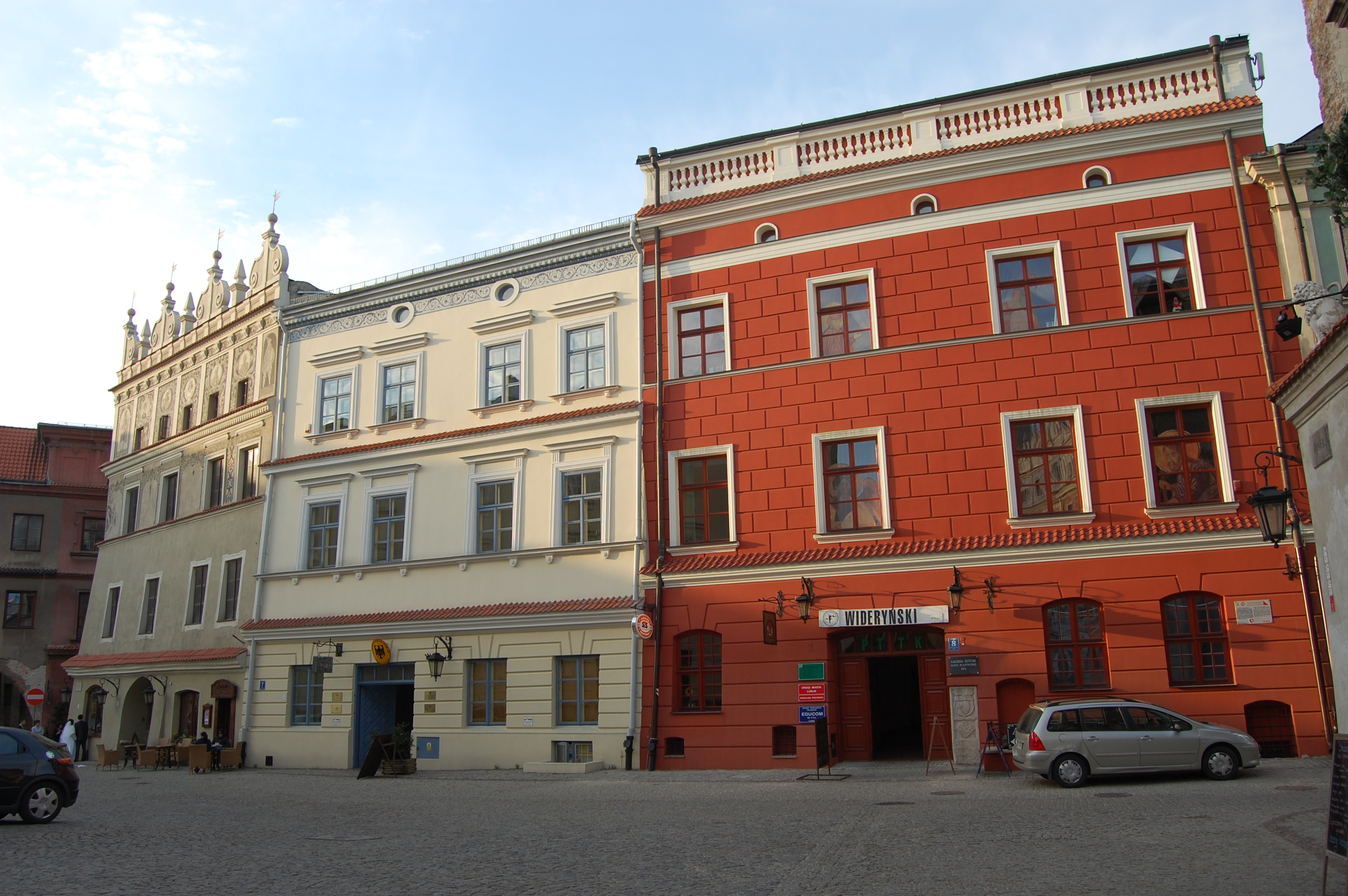
Historic tenement houses at the Market Square

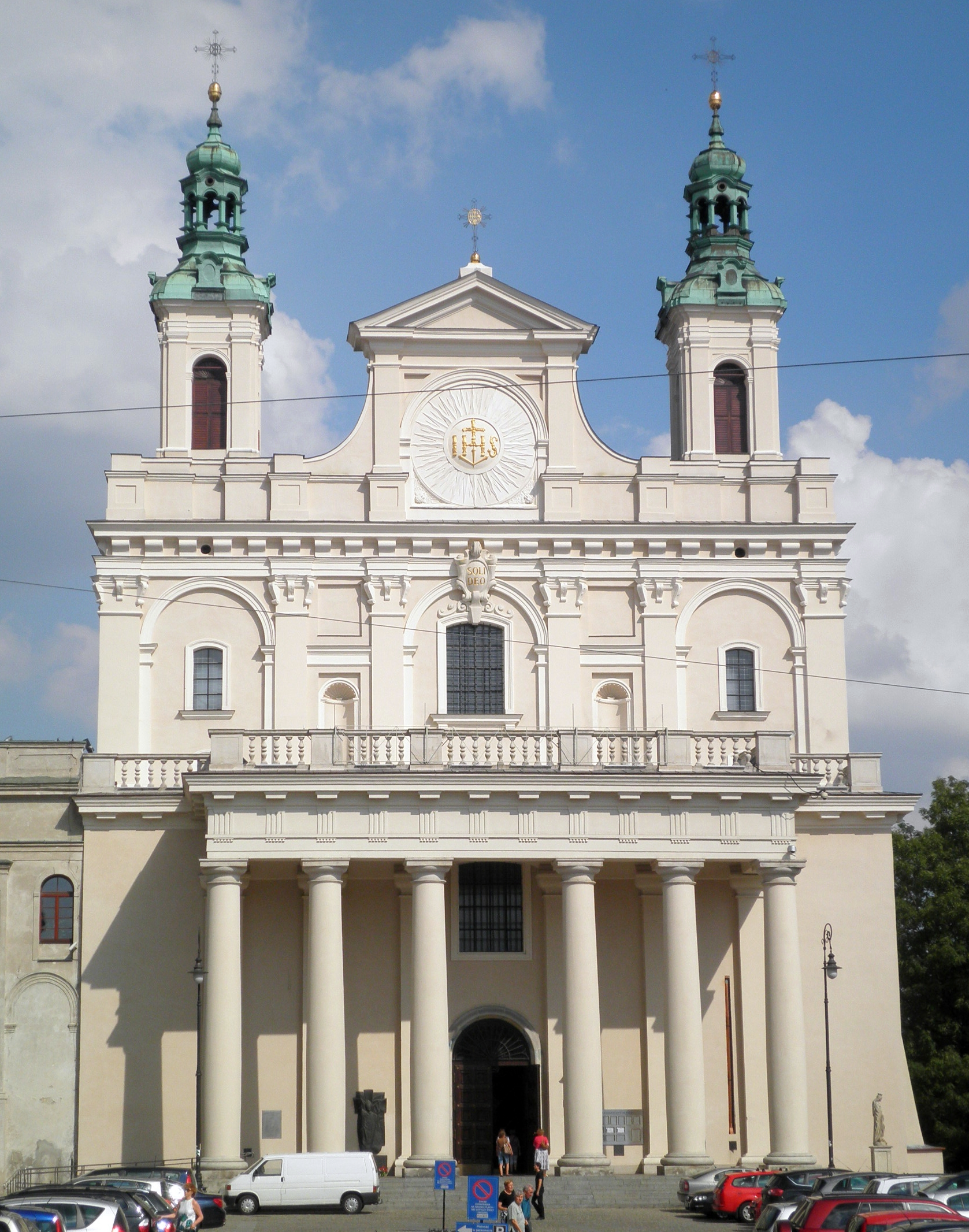
Lublin Cathedral

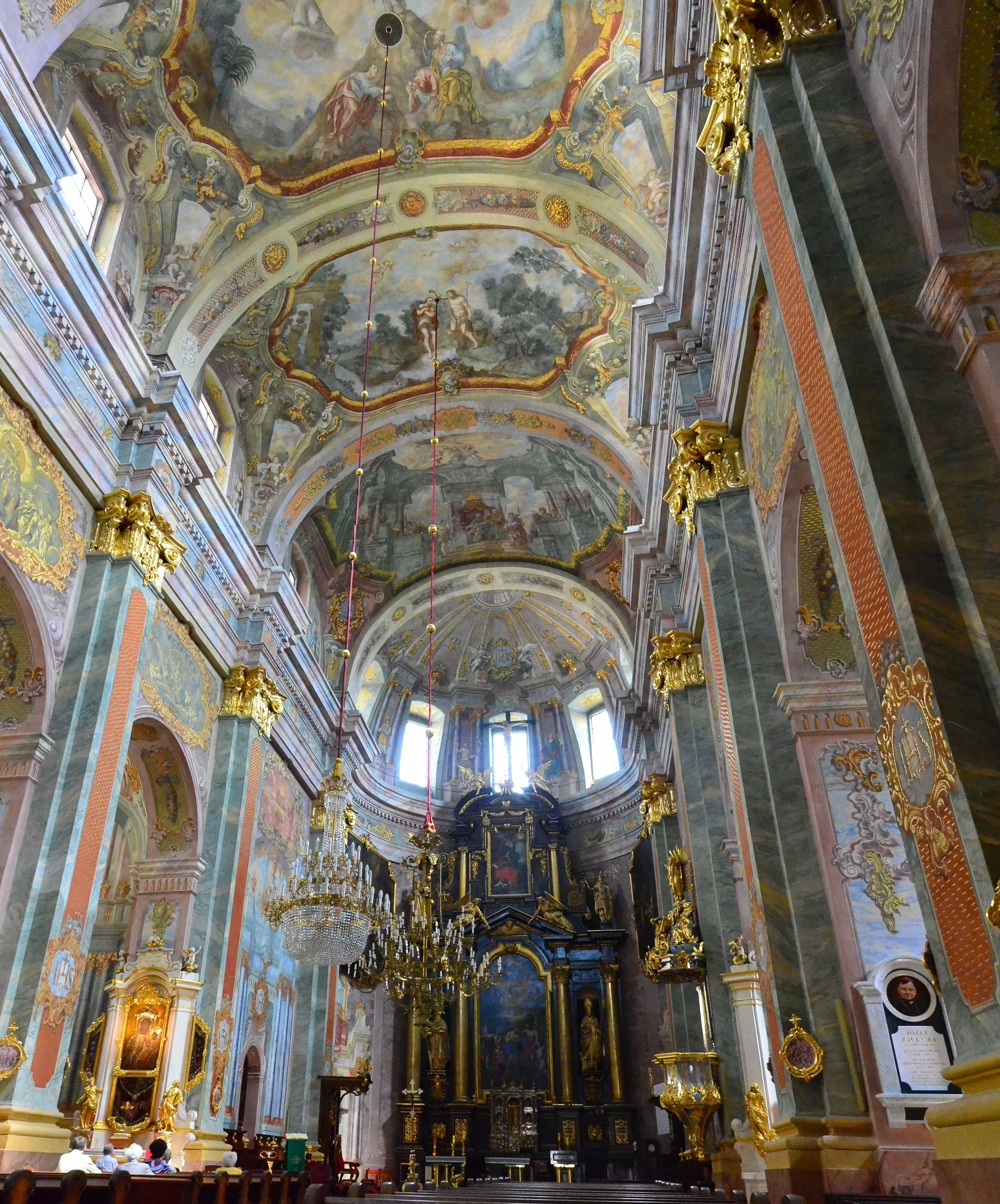
Interior of the Cathedral

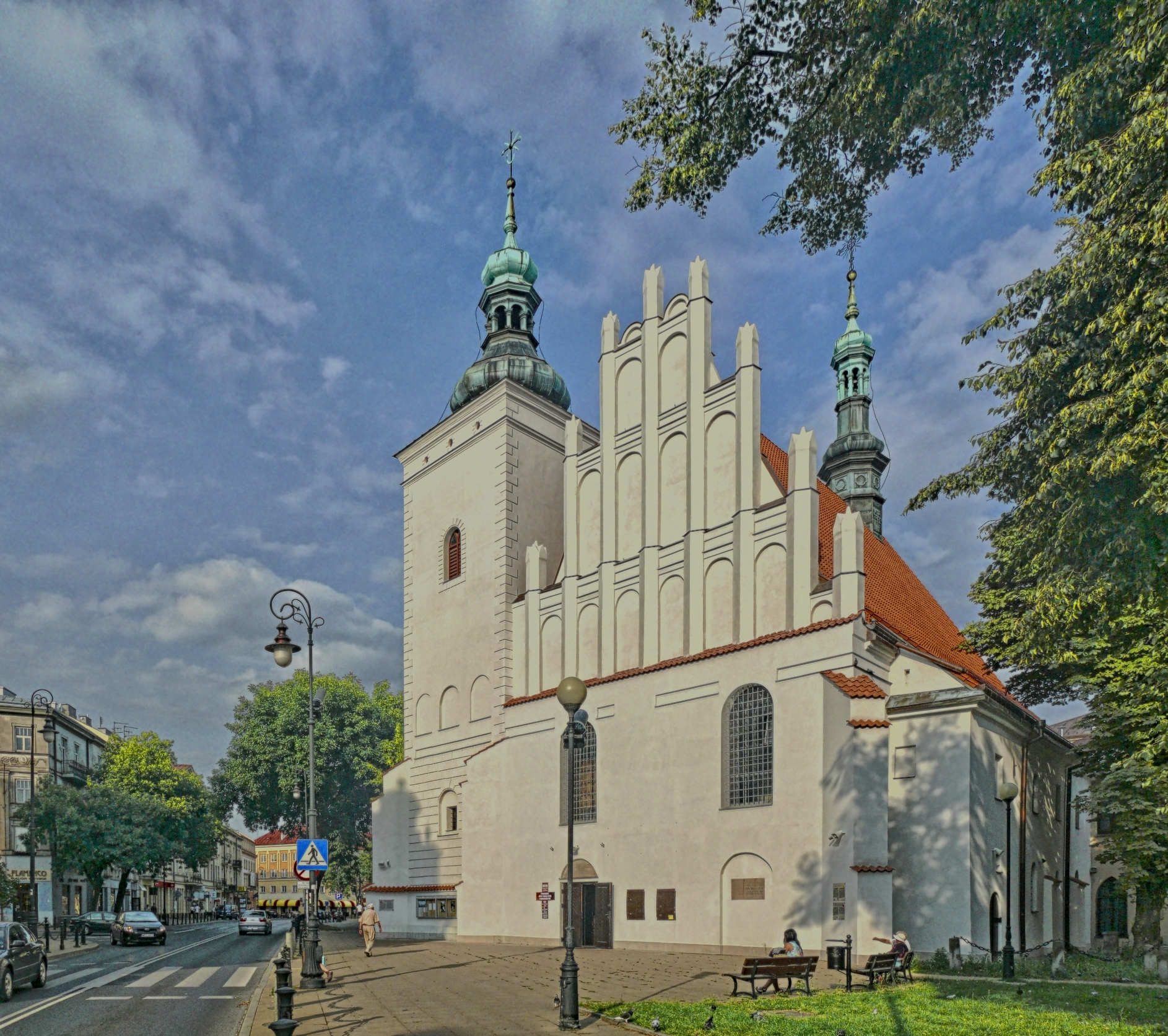
Late Gothic Virgin Mary Victorious Church

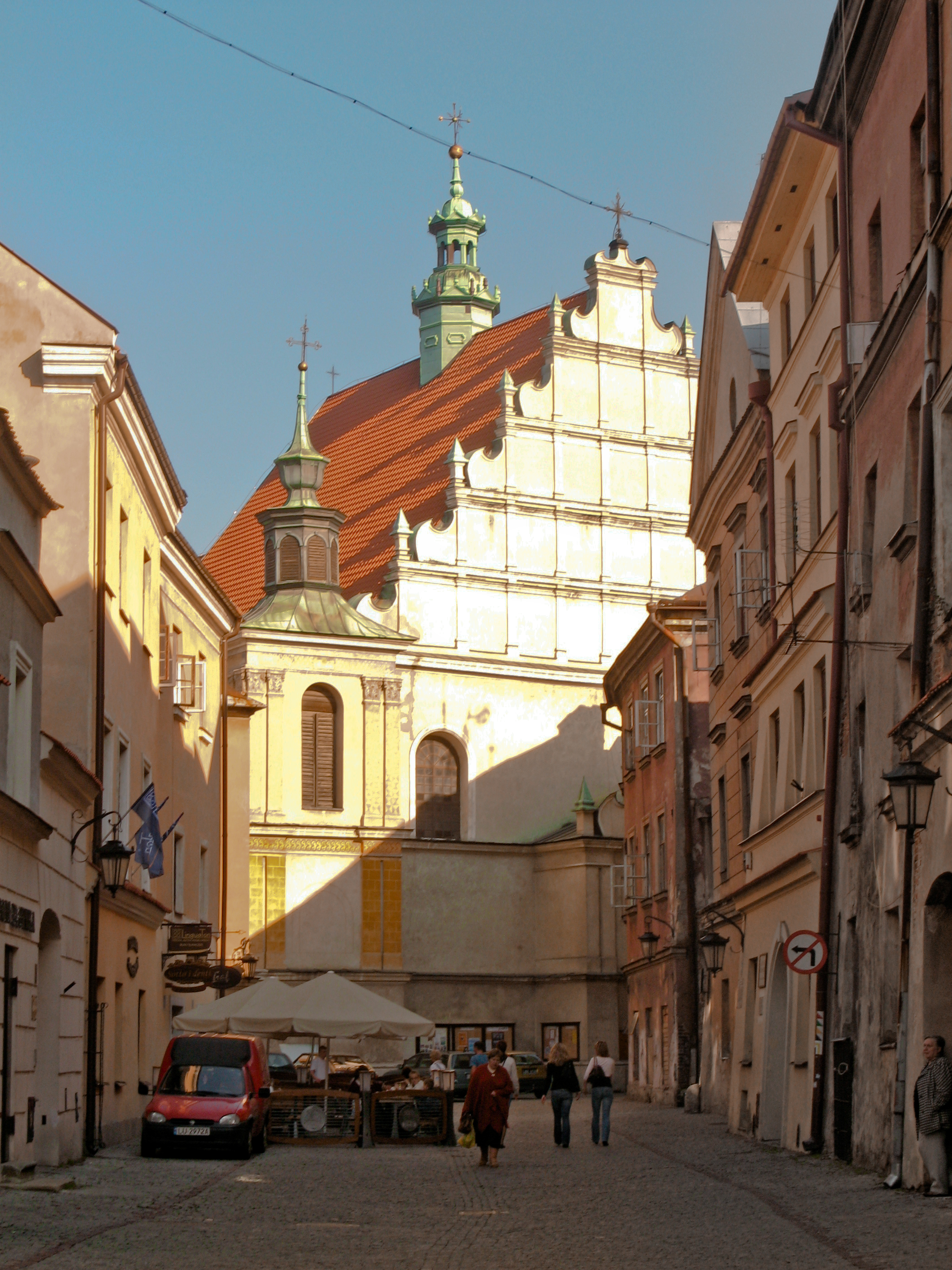
Dominican Church

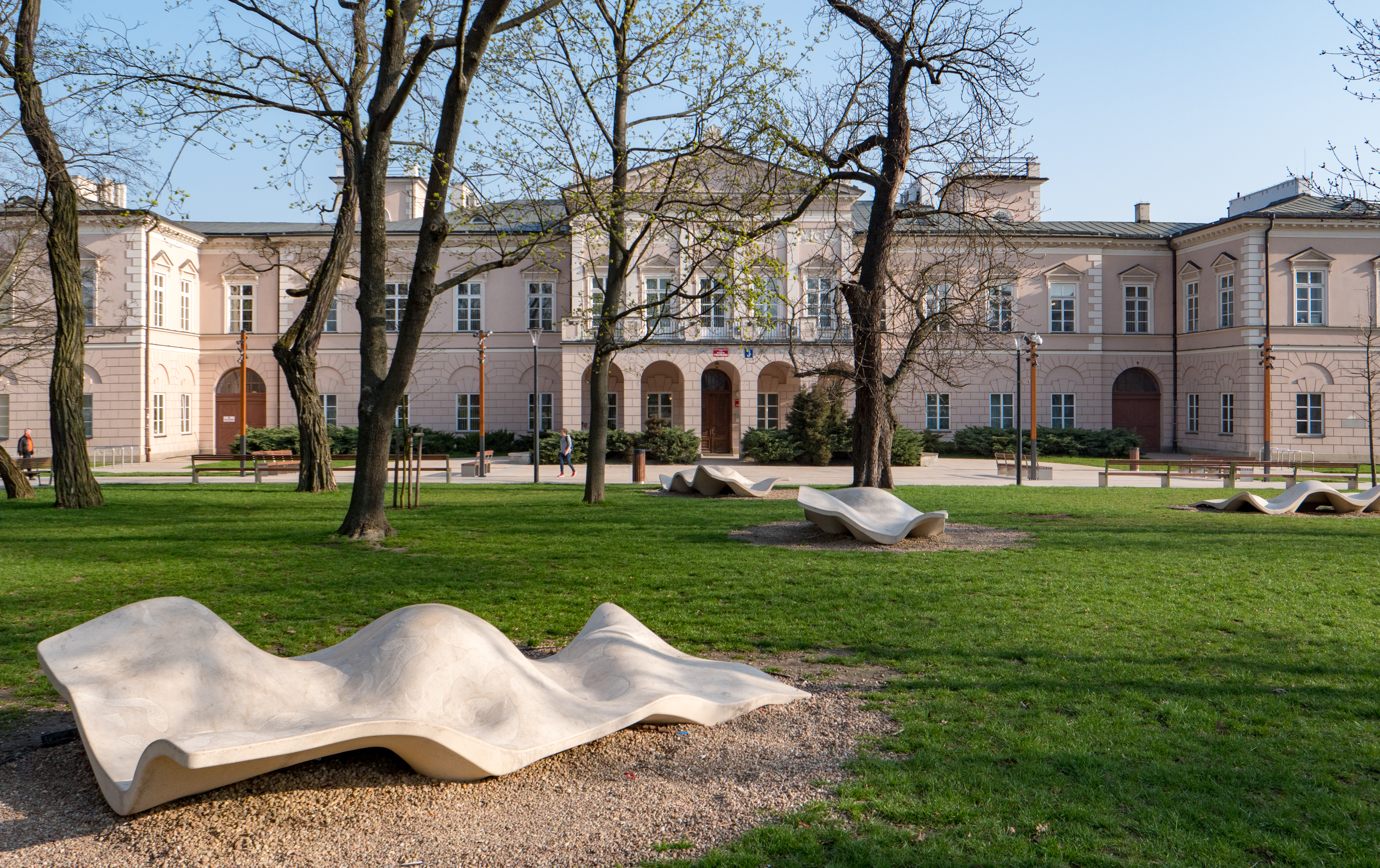
Lubomirski Palace

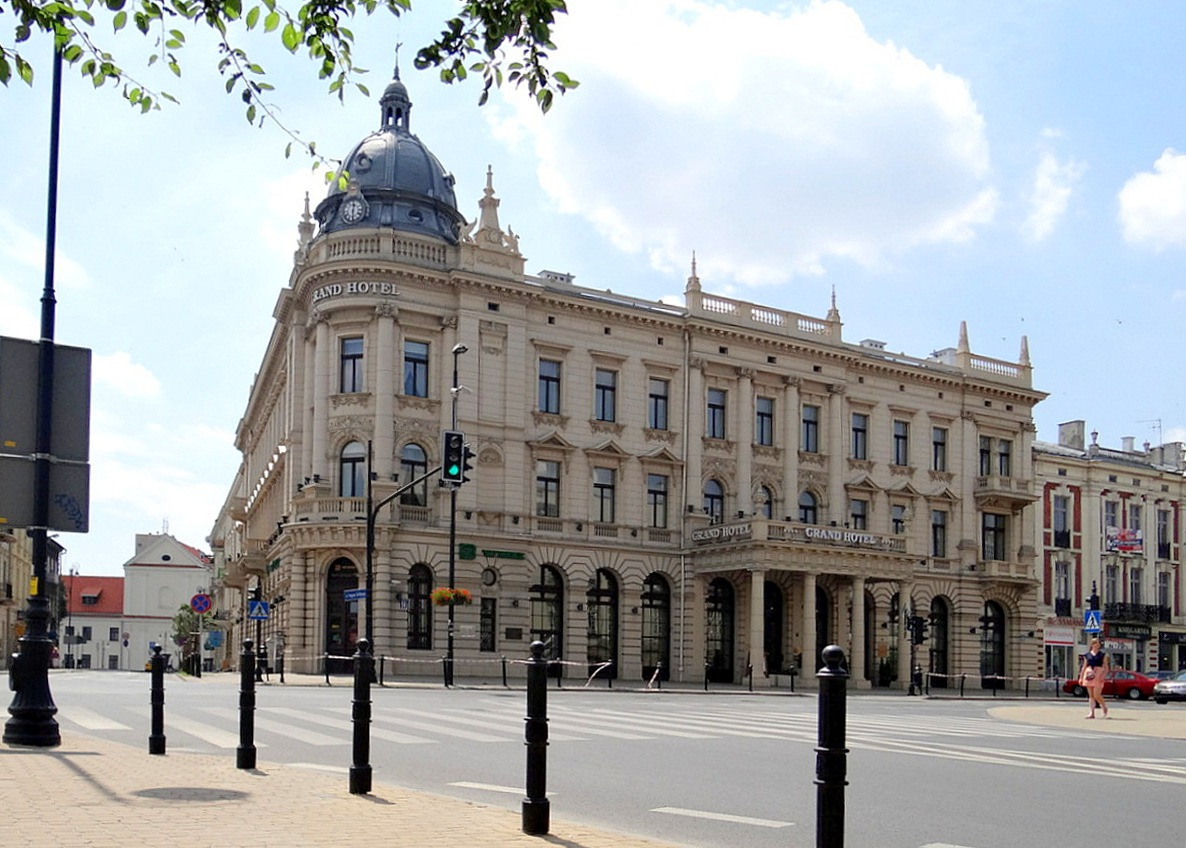
Eclectic Grand Hotel Lublinianka

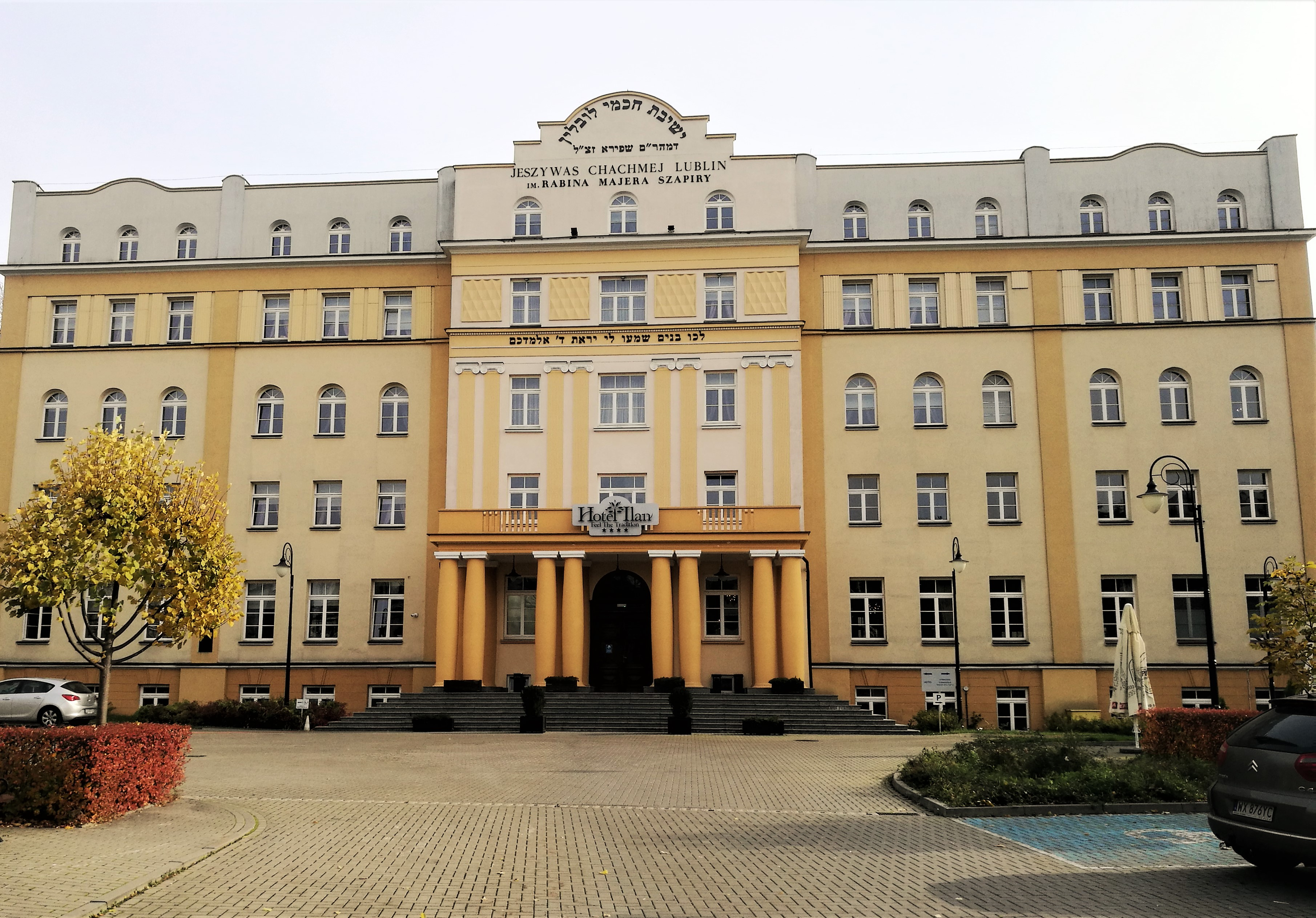
Chachmei Lublin Yeshiva and its synagogue

=== The arts ===
==== Museum ====
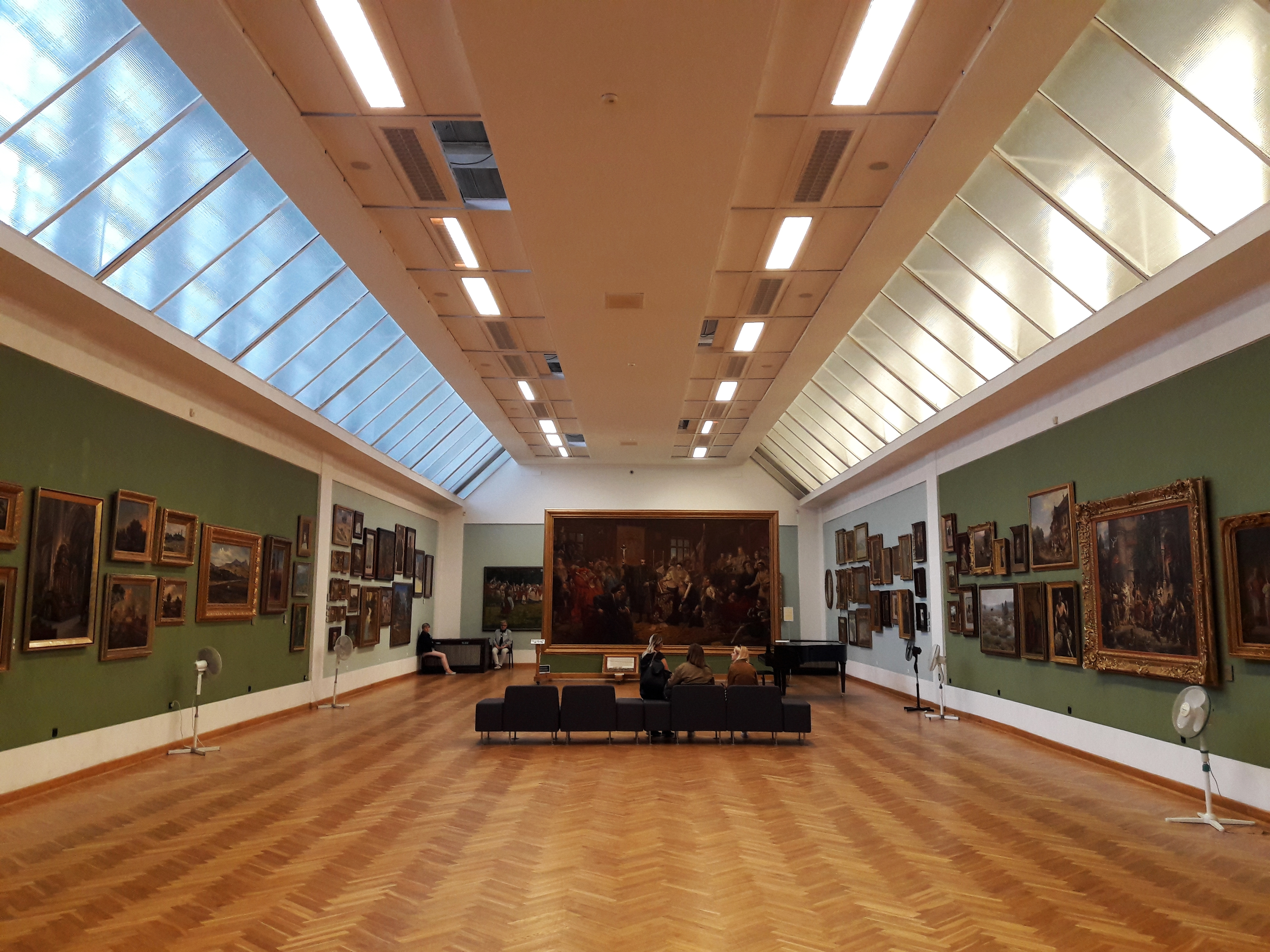
National Museum in Lublin

The premier museum in the city is the National Museum of Lublin, one of the oldest and largest museums of Eastern Poland. It is located in the Lublin castle and contains some castle's interiors, like the Holy Trinity Chapel with its frescoes in the Byzantine style. The museum permanent collection include also many Polish and foreign painting from the 17th to 20th century, as well as the gallery of paintings by Tamara de Lempicka.

Other museums include also the Museum of the History of the City of Lublin, the Museum of the Eastern Territories of the Old Polish Republic, the Józef Czechowicz Museum, the Under the clock Martyrdom Museum and the Museum of Housing Estates on the Słowacki Housing Estate.

Important museum is also the Majdanek State Museum in the former Majdanek Nazi concentration and extermination camp. In 2011 it was visited by 121,404 visitors.

==== Cinema ====
Lublin is a city with a proactive approach towards filmmaking industry. The city is featured in some notable films, and that include Oscar-winning The Reader which was partially filmed at the Nazi Majdanek concentration camp.

In 2008, Lublin collaborated with Ukrainian Lviv, to film and distribute promotional materials which painted both cities as attractive to the filmmaking industry. Films were handed out between filmmakers present at Cannes Festival. This was sponsored by the European Union. There are numerous movie theatres in Lublin including a few multiplexes, i.e. Cinema City and Multikino chains, also smaller venues like Cinema Bajka, Cinema Chatka Żaka, Cinema Perla, Cinema Grazyna and Cinema Medyk.

The Lublin Film Fund has been active since 2009, actively caring for cultivation of cinematographic talents in Lublin and promoting the city by provision of financial and organizational support. Numerous feature films have been partially financed by the fund, including Kamienie na Szaniec, Panie Dulskie, Volta and award-winning Carte Blanche.

==== Theatres ====
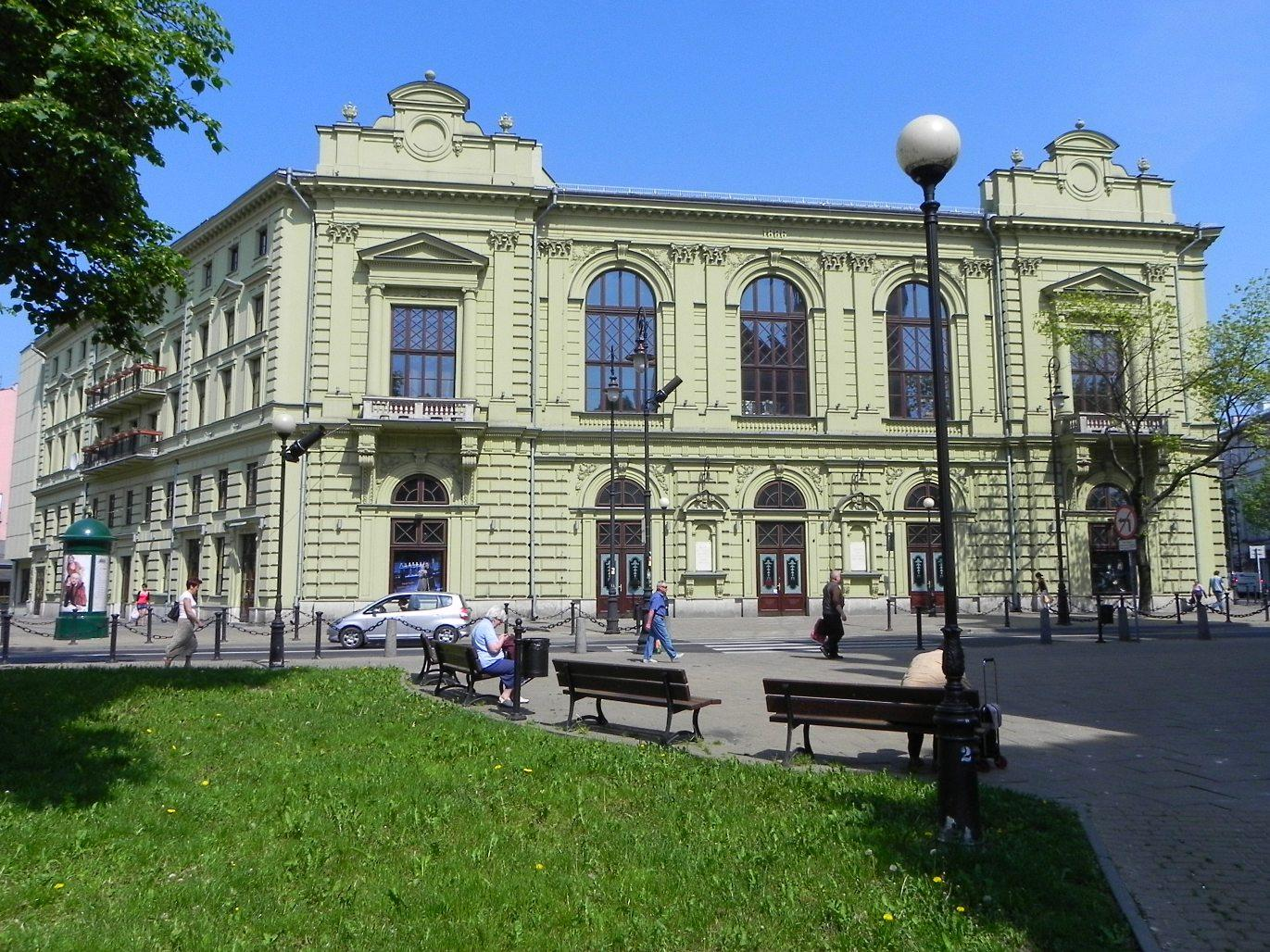
Juliusz Osterwa Theatre

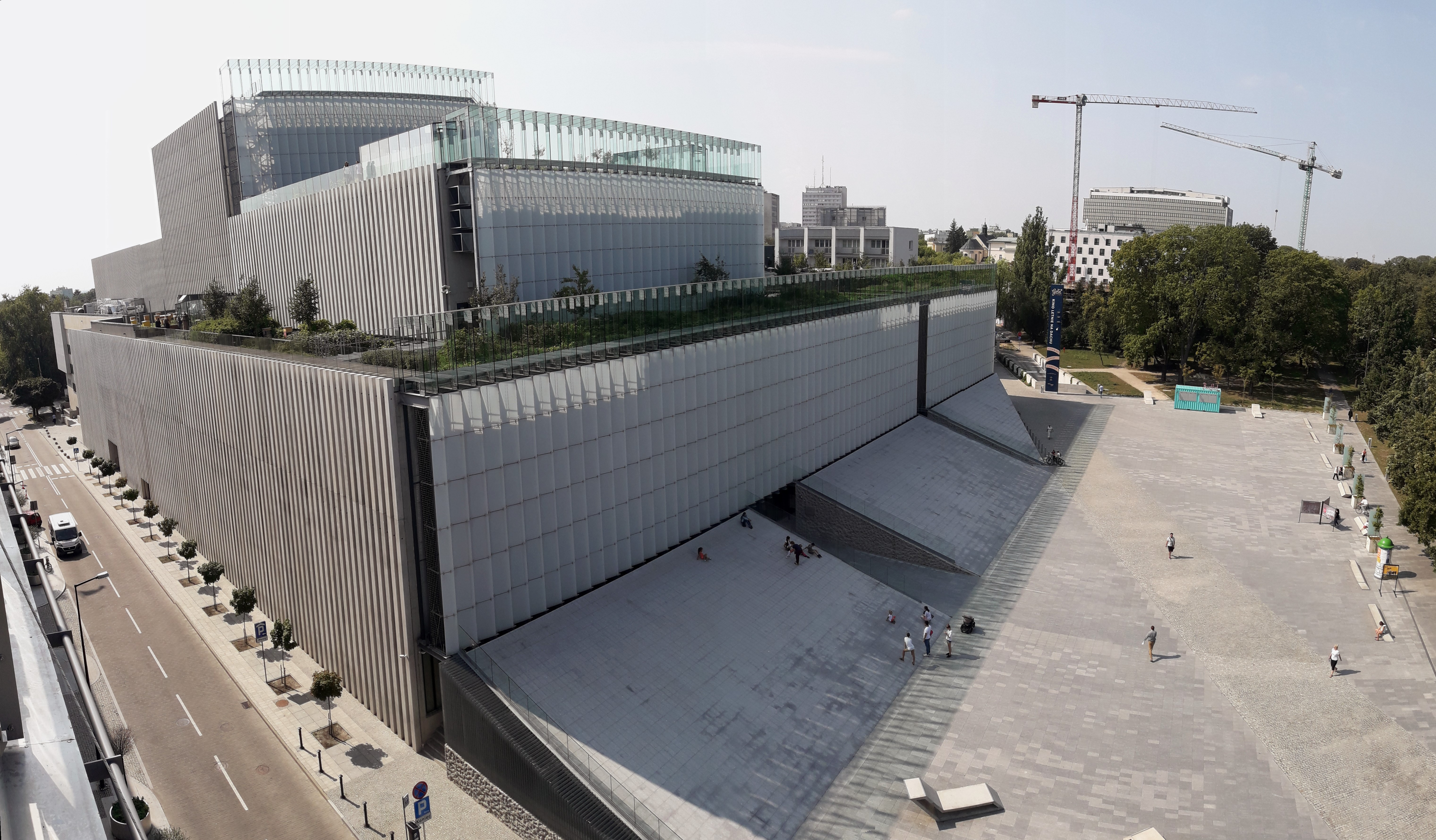
The Centre for the Meeting of Cultures and Teatralny Square, view from the Lublin Conference Center

There are many cultural organizations in Lublin, either municipal, governmental and/or non-governmental. Among the popular venues are municipal theatres and playhouses such as:

- Musical Theatre in Lublin – Teatr Muzyczny w Lublinie, opera, operetta, musical, ballet
- Henryk Wieniawski Lublin Philharmonic – Filharmonia Lubelska
- Juliusz Osterwa Theatre
- Hans Christian Andersen Theatre – with puppet programmes for children

Fringe theatres:

- Centrum Kultury w Lublinie
- Ośrodek Praktyk Teatralnych – Gardzienice
- Ośrodek "Brama Grodzka – Theatre NN"
- Centrum Projekt Pracovnia Maat

==== Galleries ====
There are numerous art galleries in Lublin; some are run by private owners, and some are municipal, government, NGO, or associations' venues. The Labyrinth Gallery (formerly "BWA") is the Artistic Exhibitions Office – Biuro Wystaw

=== Food and music ===
In the Old Town and the immediate surrounding, over 100 unique restaurants, fine-dining venues, cafes, pubs, clubs and other catering outlets are located. In the latter half of the 2010s, the robust international community gathered around Lublin's Medical University has impacted the growth of restaurants offering various world cuisines.

Catering to students, who account for 35% of the population, the city offers a music and nightclub scene. Lublin has many theatres and museums and a professional orchestra, the Lublin Philharmonic.

=== City of festivals ===
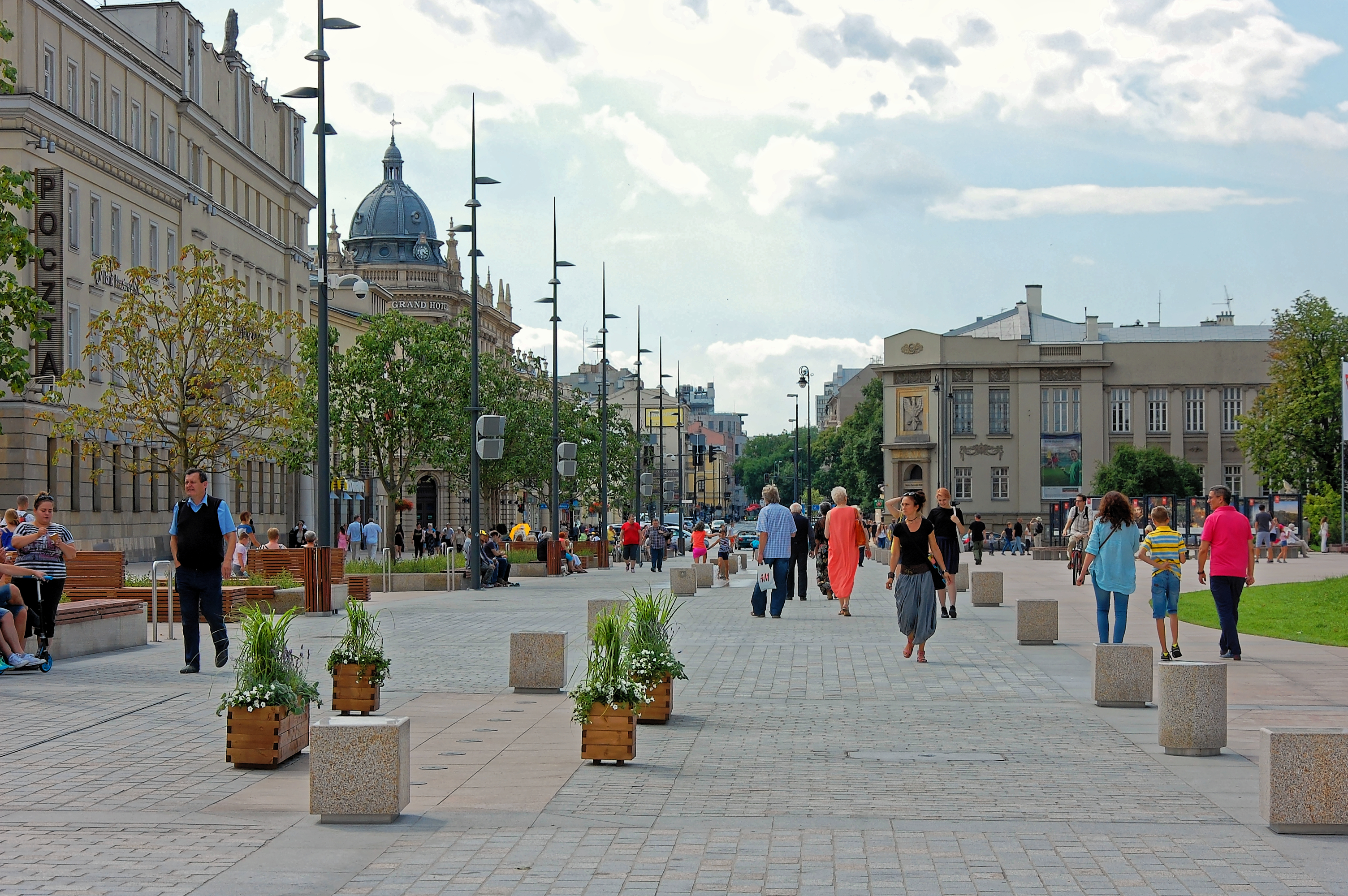
Litewski Square

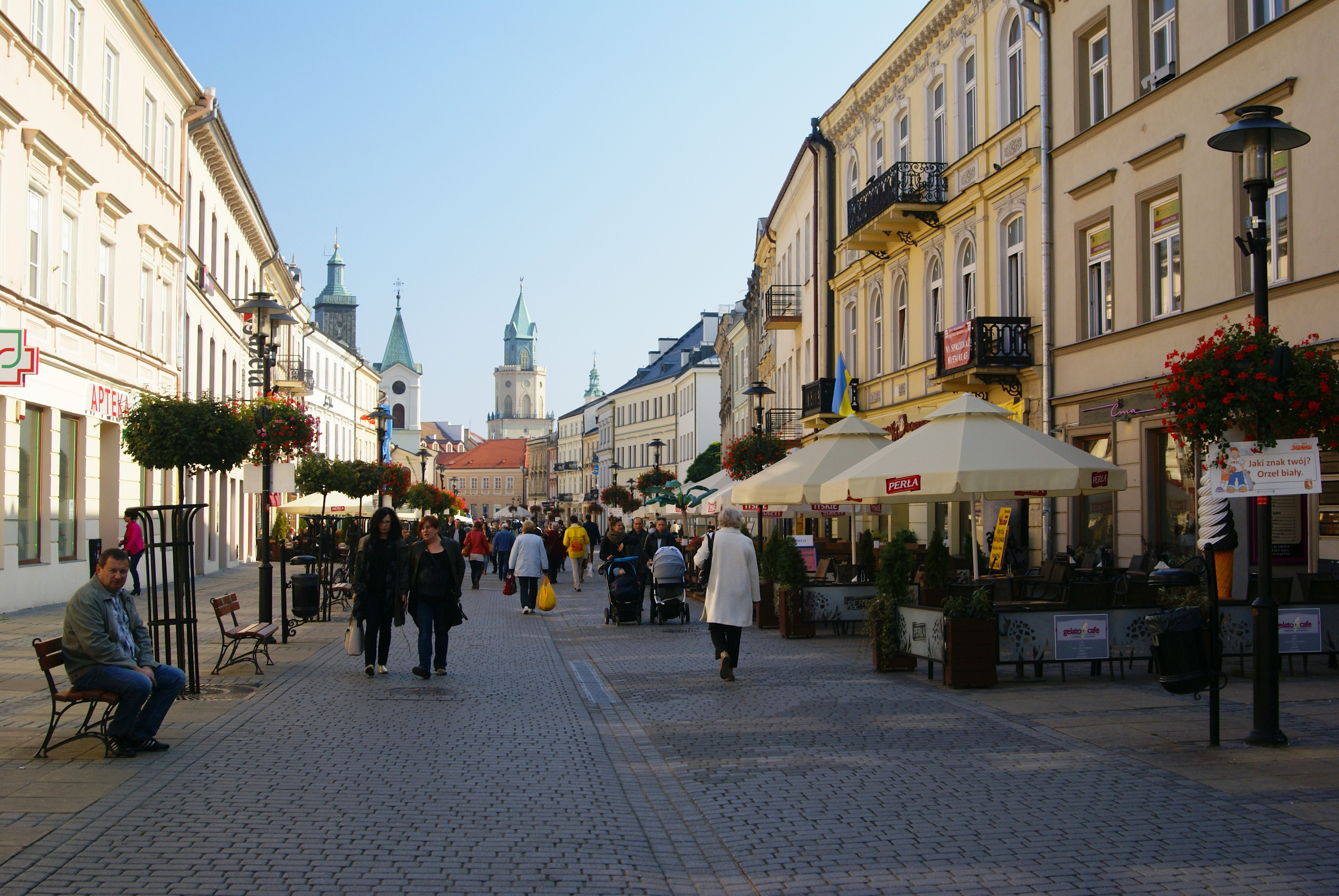
Krakowskie Przedmieście, one of the main streets of the historic city center

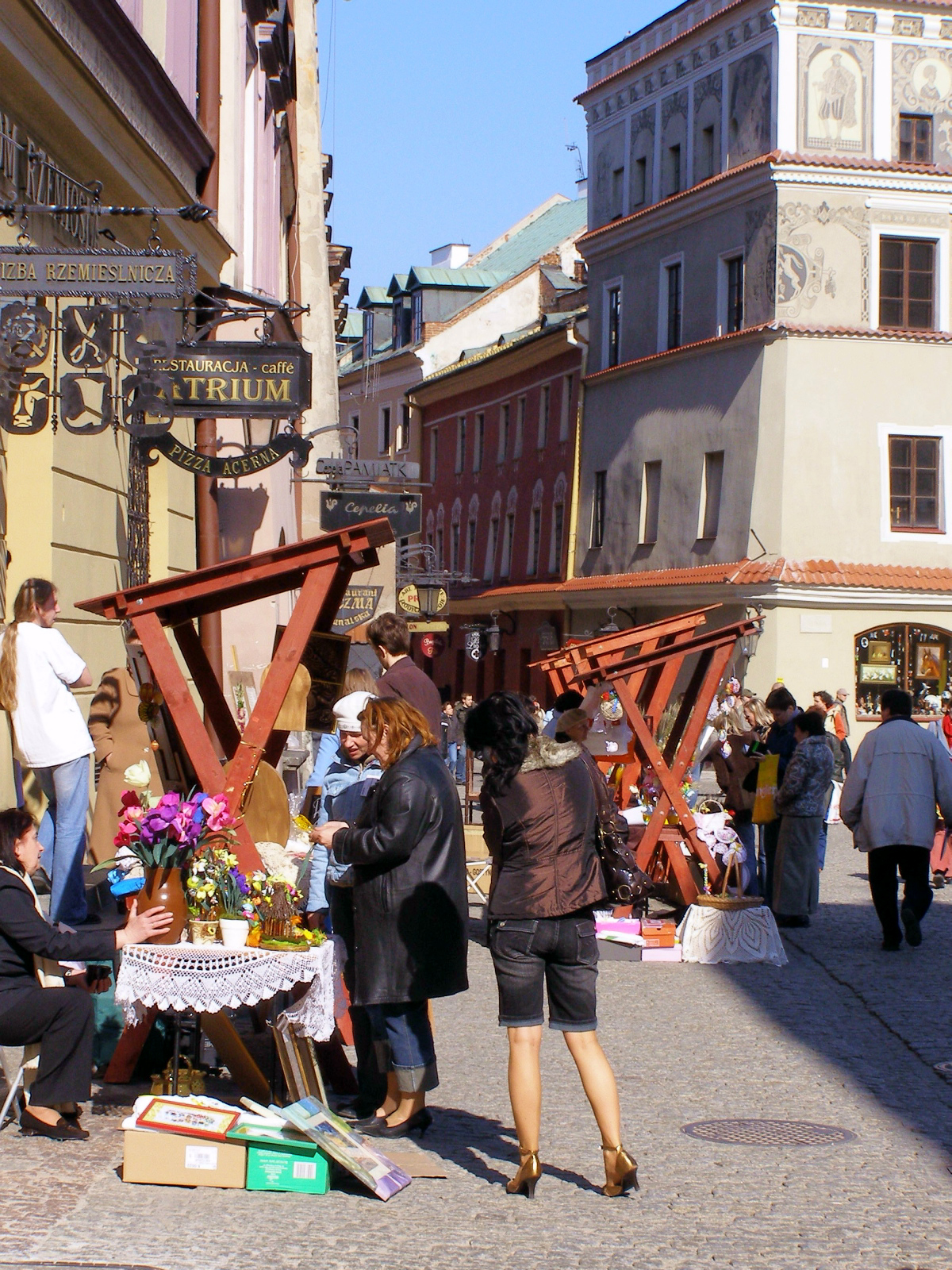
A street fair in the Old Town

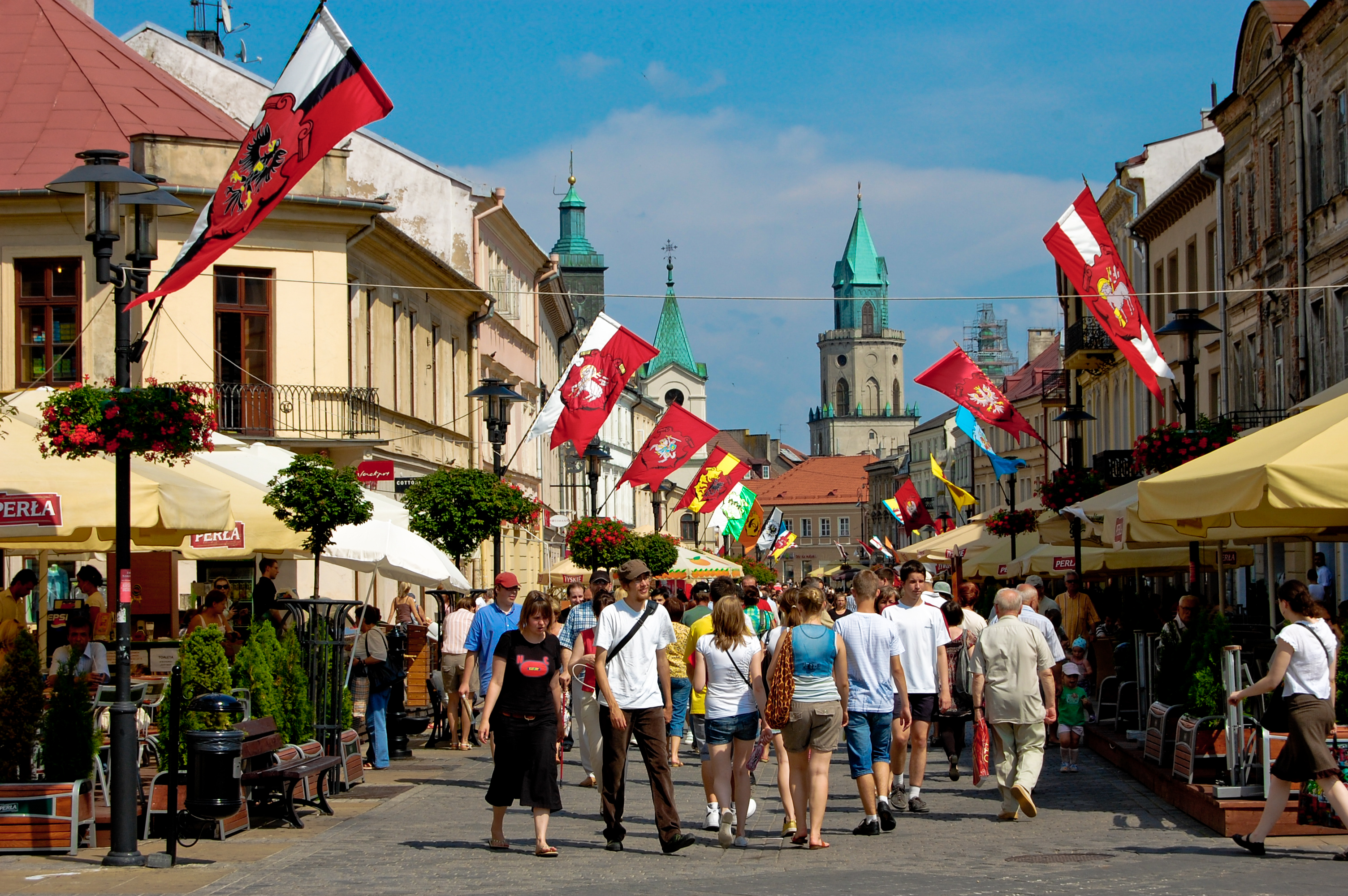
440th anniversary of the Union of Lublin

Lublin aims to be known as the Polish Capital of Festivals. Most years, Lublin increases the number of festivals held in the city. The most significant of them include:

- Carnaval Sztukmistrzów – held in last days of July, is the largest new circus festival in Poland. Name of the Carnival is inspired by the character of The Magician of Lublin, from a novel by Isaac Bashevis Singer.
- Urban Highline Festival – held in last days of July
- Night of Culture (Noc Kultury) – usually held on the first Saturday night of June. Consisting of hundreds of events spanning the city, it is a cultural manifestation of Lublin's potential. Admission to all events is free.
- OpenCity Festival – outdoor performances festival. International artists and performers create art installations in public places in Lublin.
- Night of Museums – Lublin's culture institutions become open to visitors at night.
- The Jagiellonian Fair (Jarmark Jagielloński) – held in late August, is a chance to meet numerous artists, artisans, and craftspeople from Central and Eastern Europe.
- St Nicolas Day International Festival of Folk Music (Mikołajki Folkowe) – the oldest folk music festival in Poland, held in the first decade of December
- East Of Culture – Different Sounds Art'n'Music Festival (Wschód Kultury – Inne Brzmienia Art'n'Music Festival), held in late June, is a meeting of world-class artists that represent various nationalities and practise diverse music styles.
- Lubelskie Dni Kultury Studenckiej – Lublin's Days of Student Culture – an annual students' holiday. Usually celebrated for about three weeks between May and June. Due to the city's large student population, the festival in Lublin is the longest in Poland.
- Lublin. Miasto Poezji – Poetry Festival organised by Ośrodek "Brama Grodzka – Teatr NN" and Polish Literature Institute of Catholic University in Lublin.
- Noc z Czechowiczem – A Night with Czechowicz – a walking tour, inspired by the "Poem on the City of Lublin" written by Józef Czechowicz. It is held on the first full moon in July, and is organised by Ośrodek "Brama Grodzka – Teatr NN".
- Najstarsze Pieśni Europy – The oldest songs of Europe – Festival of Muzyka Kresów Foundation
- Future Shorts – World Short Film Label
- International Lublin Dance Festival – Międzynarodowe Spotkania Teatrów Tańca – one of the leading dance art festivals in Europe
- International Theatre Festival "Confrontations" – Międzynarodowy Festiwal Teatralny "Konfrontacje"
- Ukraine in the Center of Lublin – Ukraina w Centrum Lublina – held in November since 2008, is a showcase of contemporary Ukrainian culture and a space for Polish-Ukrainian intercultural dialogue.
- "Falkon" – Fantasy and Science Fiction Festival – Ogólnopolski Festiwal Fantastyki Falkon – held in November, is one of the biggest fantasy conventions in Poland.
- Polish Students' Theatre Festival – Studencki Ogólnopolski Festiwal Teatralny Kontestacje
- International Folk Dance Festival – Międzynarodowe Spotkania Folklorystyczne im. Ignacego Wachowiaka
- Scena Młodych – Youth Scene, music festival
- Zwierciadła – Mirrors – High School Theatres Revision
- Zaduszki Jazzowe – Jazz Souls' Day – which take place in Dominican Order Monastery

=== European Capital of Culture ===
In 2007, Lublin joined the group of Polish cities as candidates for the title of European Capital of Culture. Lublin was shortlisted, but ultimately Wrocław was chosen. Lublin is a pilot city of the Council of Europe and the European Commission Intercultural cities programme.

== Sports ==
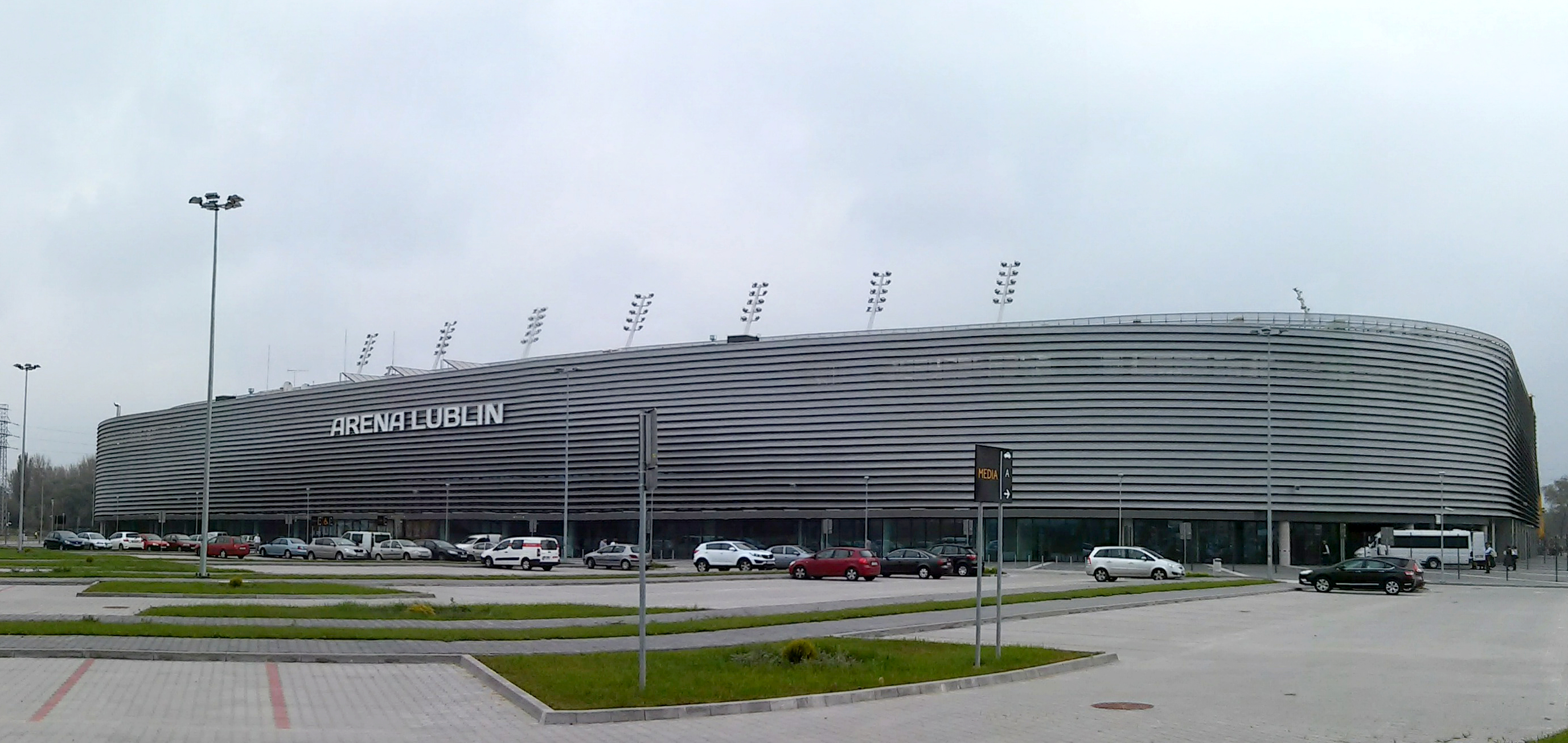
Arena Lublin

Professional sports teams
Club	Sport	League	Trophies
Speed Car Motor Lublin	Speedway	Ekstraliga	3 Polish Championships (2022, 2023, 2024)
Start Lublin	Basketball (men's)	Polish Basketball League	0
MKS Lublin	Handball (women's)	Polish Women's Superliga	22 Polish Championships; 11 Polish Cups; 1 Women's EHF Cup (2001)
AZS UMCS Lublin	Basketball (women's)	Basket Liga Kobiet	2 Polish Championships (2023, 2026); 1 Polish Cup (2016)
Budowlani Lublin	Rugby union	Ekstraliga	1 Polish Cup (2002)
LUK Lublin	Volleyball (men's)	PlusLiga	1 Polish Championship (2025); 1 CEV Challenge Cup (2025); 1 Polish Cup (2026)
Motor Lublin	Football (men's)	Ekstraklasa	0
AZS UMCS Lublin	Futsal (men's)	I liga	0

Other notable clubs:

- AZS UMCS Lublin – multi-sports club, one of the top athletics clubs in Poland.
- Lublinianka – men's football team competing in the Polish 4th Division (as of 2023), city's oldest football club.
- Unia Lublin – women's football team competing in the II liga (3rd tier) (as of 2023).
- LSKT – Lublin's Taekwon-do sport club.
- Tytani Lublin – semi-professional American football team.

=== International events ===
- 2019 FIFA U-20 World Cup
- An annual motocross race

== Education ==
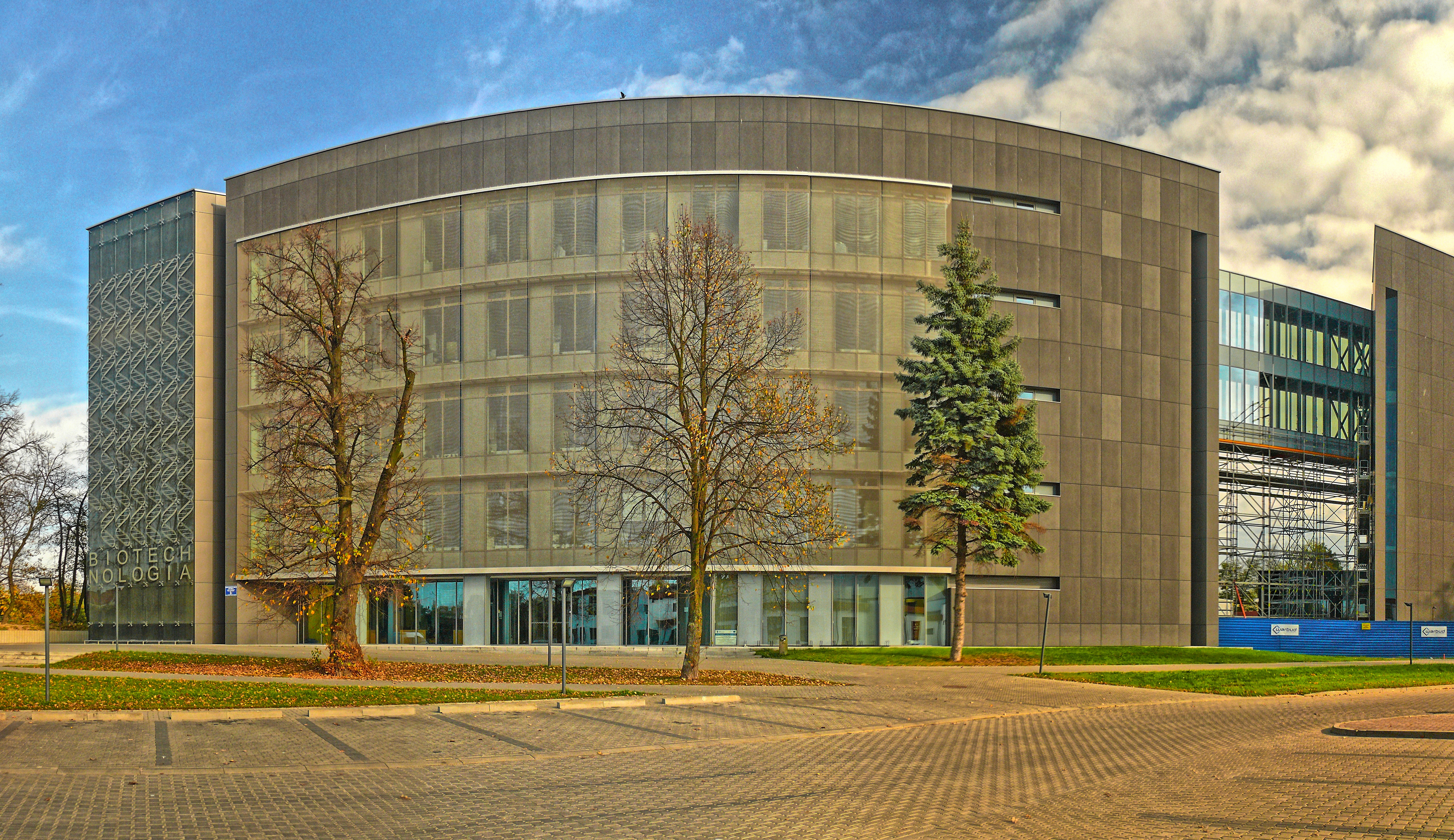
Faculty of Biotechnology, KUL

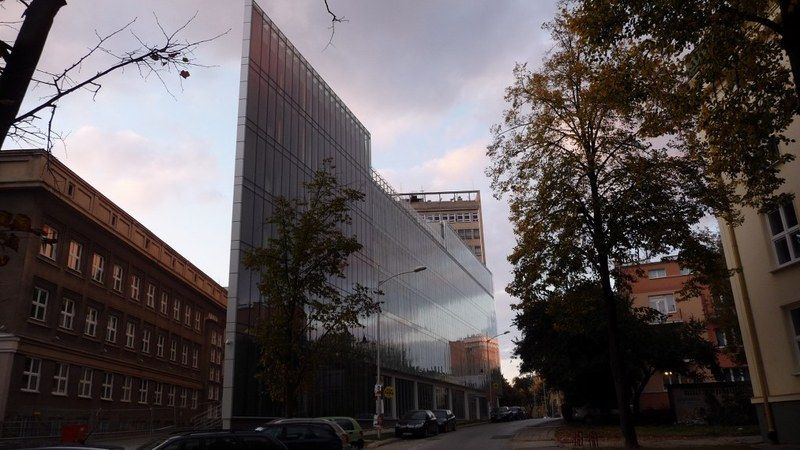
Faculty of Information Technology, UMCS

There are five public schools of higher education:

- Maria Curie-Sklodowska University (UMCS)
- John Paul II Catholic University of Lublin (KUL)
- Medical University of Lublin
- University of Life Sciences in Lublin
- Lublin University of Technology

Lublin is home to private higher education establishments.

- University of Economics and Innovation in Lublin
- Lubelska Szkoła Biznesu
- Wyższa Szkoła Nauk Społecznych z siedzibą w Lublinie
- Wyższa Szkoła Przedsiębiorczości i Administracji
- Vincent Pol University in Lublin

It is home to one of the oldest still-functioning schools in Poland, The Staszic School, which was established in 1586. The school has many notable alumni, such as Bolesław Prus, one of the most influential Polish writers and novelists, and Lesław Paga, the co-founder of the Warsaw Stock Exchange.

== International relations ==
Lublin is a pilot city of the Council of Europe and the EU Intercultural cities programme. In 2017, Lublin was awarded the Europe Prize by the Parliamentary Assembly of the Council of Europe. In 2023, Lublin was selected as the European Youth Capital by international jury of the European Youth Forum. Lublin is a signatory of the European charter for equality of women and men in local life.

In 2023, following the 2022 Russian invasion of Ukraine, the city of Lublin was honoured by President of Ukraine Volodymyr Zelenskyy who granted it the title of "City-Rescuer" in recognition of its humanitarian and financial assistance to Ukraine and the country's war refugees.

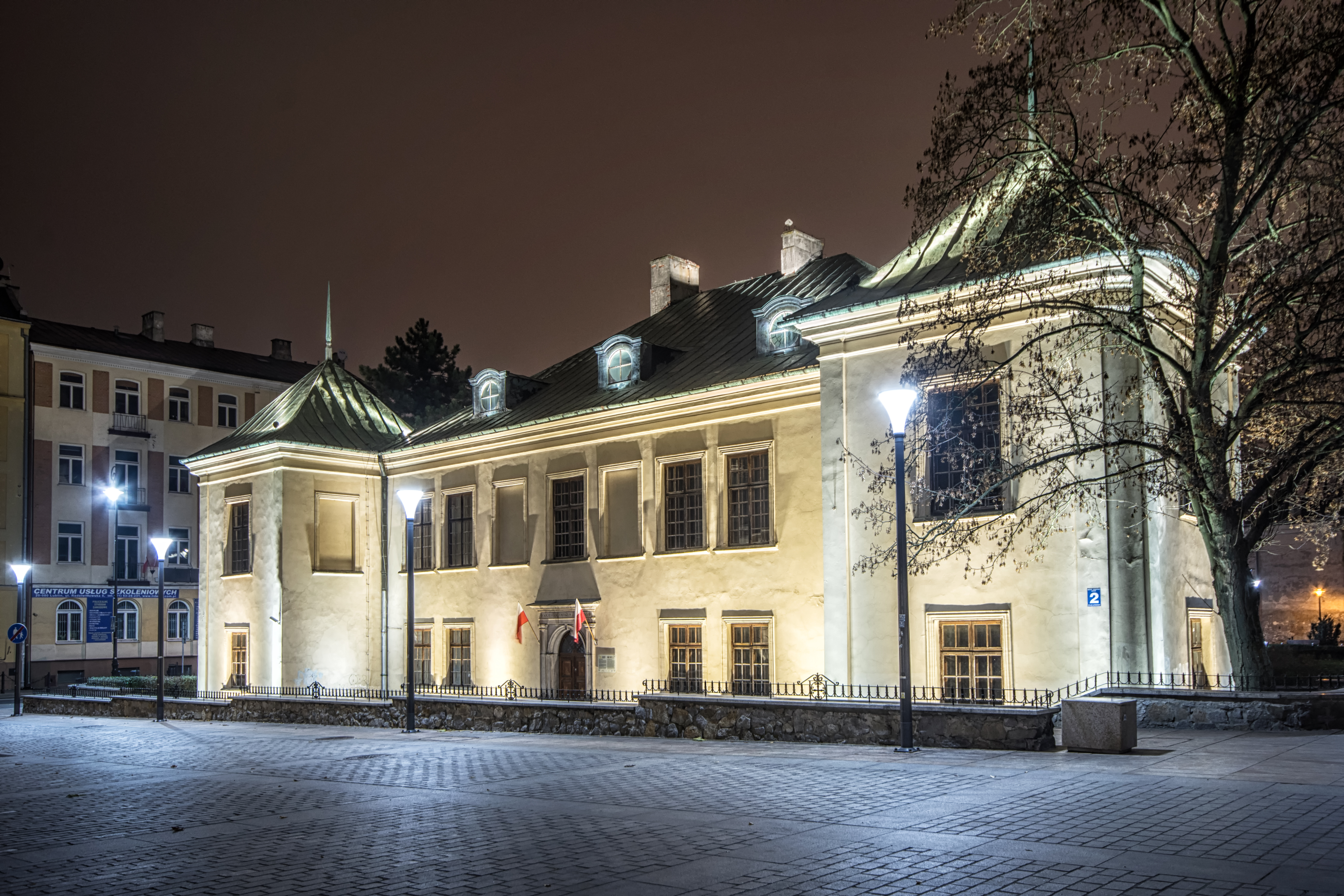
Honorary Consulate of Moldova

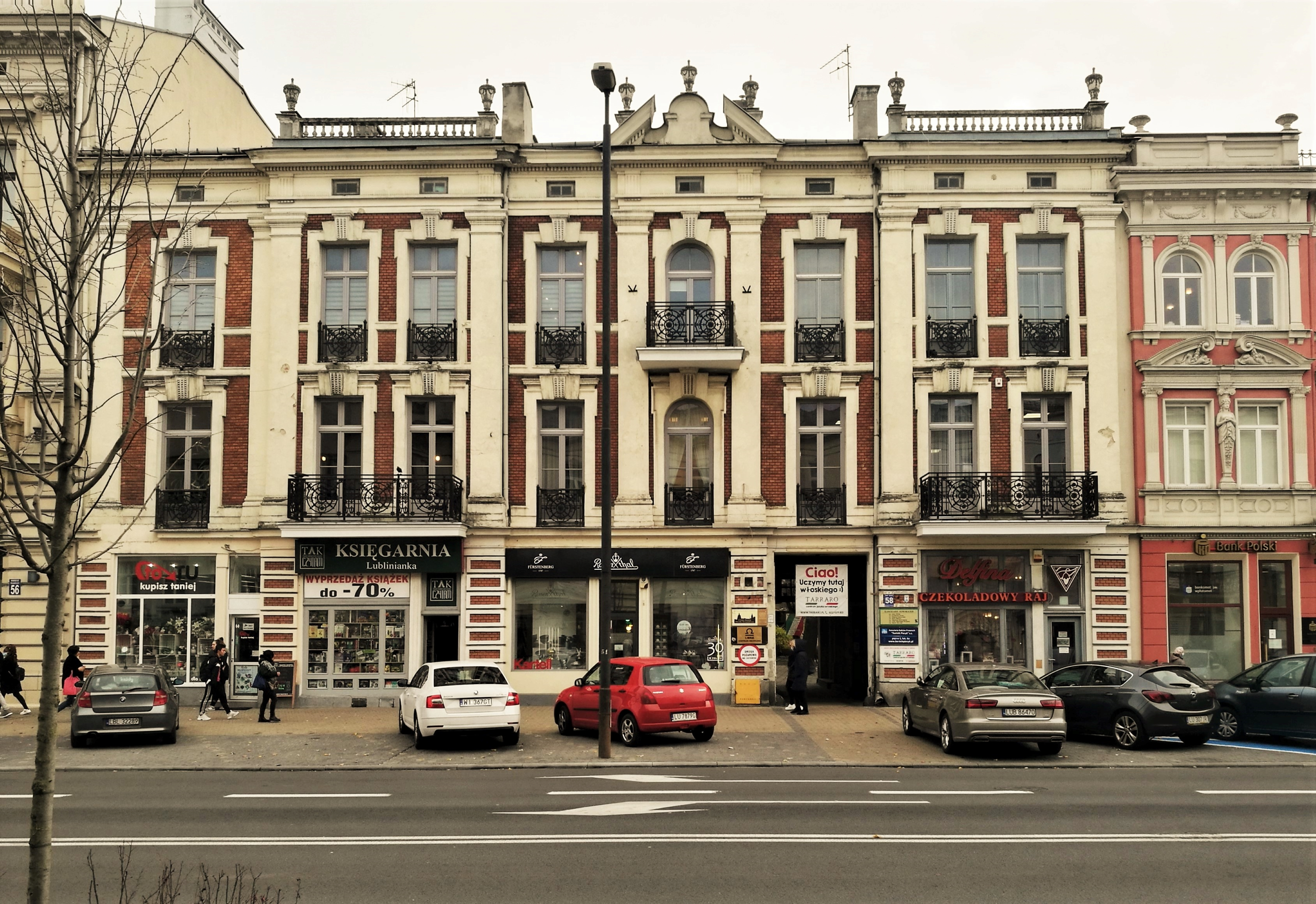
Honorary Vice-Consulate of Italy

In Lublin, there is a Consulate General of Ukraine, an Honorary Consulate General of Hungary, honorary consulates of Austria, Brazil, Czech Republic, Germany, Moldova, Peru, Slovenia, and an Honorary Vice-Consulate of Italy

Two settlements outside of Poland were created that were named Lublin. Lublin, Wisconsin, is a village in Taylor County in the United States, while Lublin, Moldova, was a Jewish agricultural colony founded in what is now the village of Nimereuca in 1842.

Lublin is one of five global locations with a portal, a public art project showing video feed of different places in rotation. The portal locations connected to Lublin are:

- Vilnius, Lithuania
- Dublin, Republic of Ireland
- Philadelphia, United States
- Ipswich, United Kingdom
- Manila, Philippines.

=== Twin towns – sister cities ===
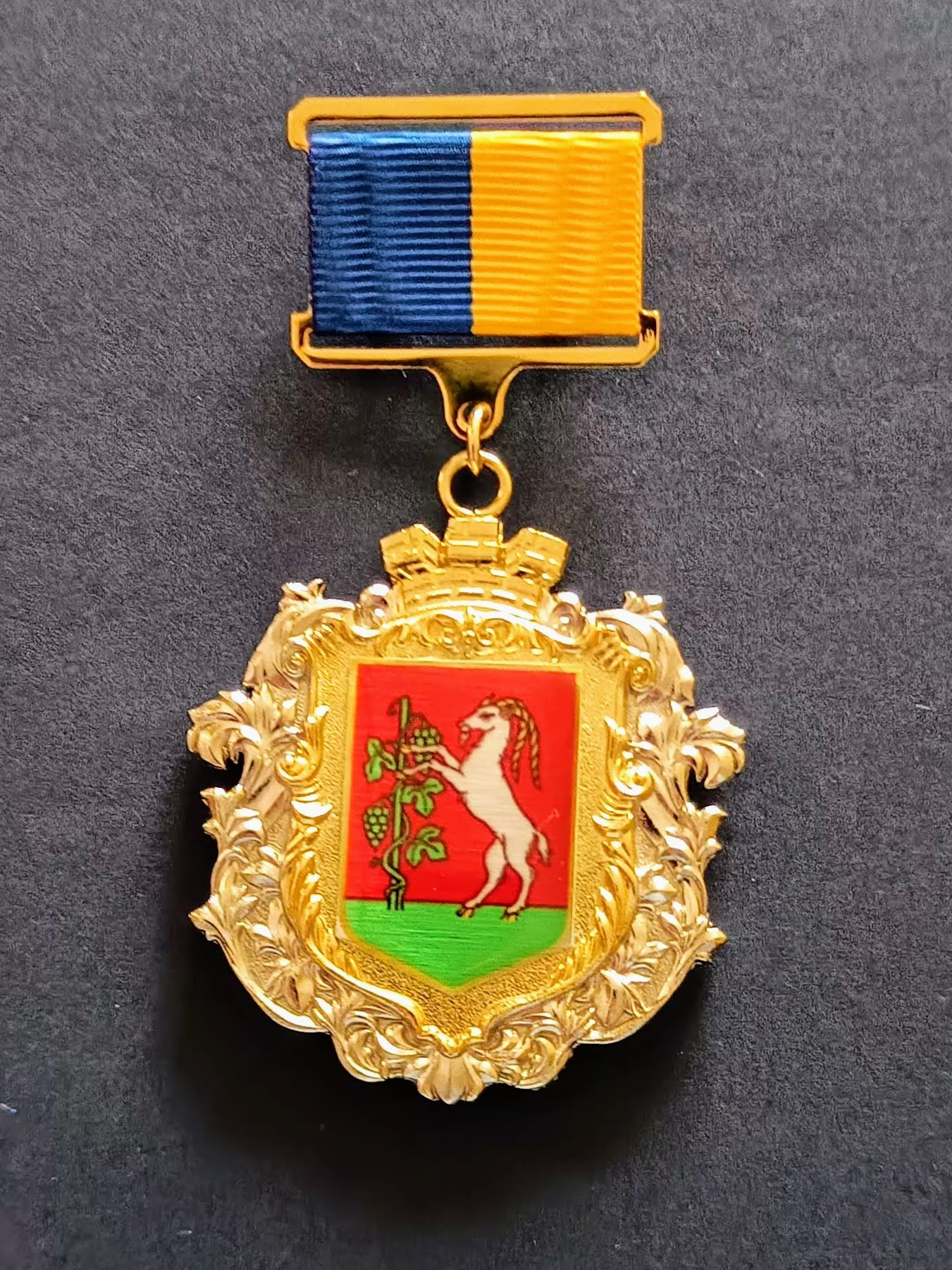
"City Rescuer" honorary badge awarded by the Ukrainian President Volodymyr Zelenskyy

Lublin is twinned with:

- Alcalá de Henares, Spain
- Debrecen, Hungary
- Delmenhorst, Germany
- Erie, Pennsylvania, United States
- Ivano-Frankivsk, Ukraine
- Kharkiv, Ukraine
- Kryvyi Rih, Ukraine
- Lancaster, United Kingdom
- Lublin, Wisconsin, United States
- Luhansk, Ukraine
- Lutsk, Ukraine
- L'viv, Ukraine
- Münster, Germany
- Nancy, France
- Nykøbing Falster, Denmark
- Panevėžys, Lithuania
- Pernik, Bulgaria
- Nilüfer, Turkey
- Rishon LeZion, Israel
- Starobilsk, Ukraine
- Sumy, Ukraine
- Tilburg, Netherlands
- Viseu, Portugal
- Windsor, Canada

Former twin towns:

- Brest, Belarus (terminated on 3 March 2022 as a response to the Belarusian involvement in the Russian invasion of Ukraine)

== Notable residents ==
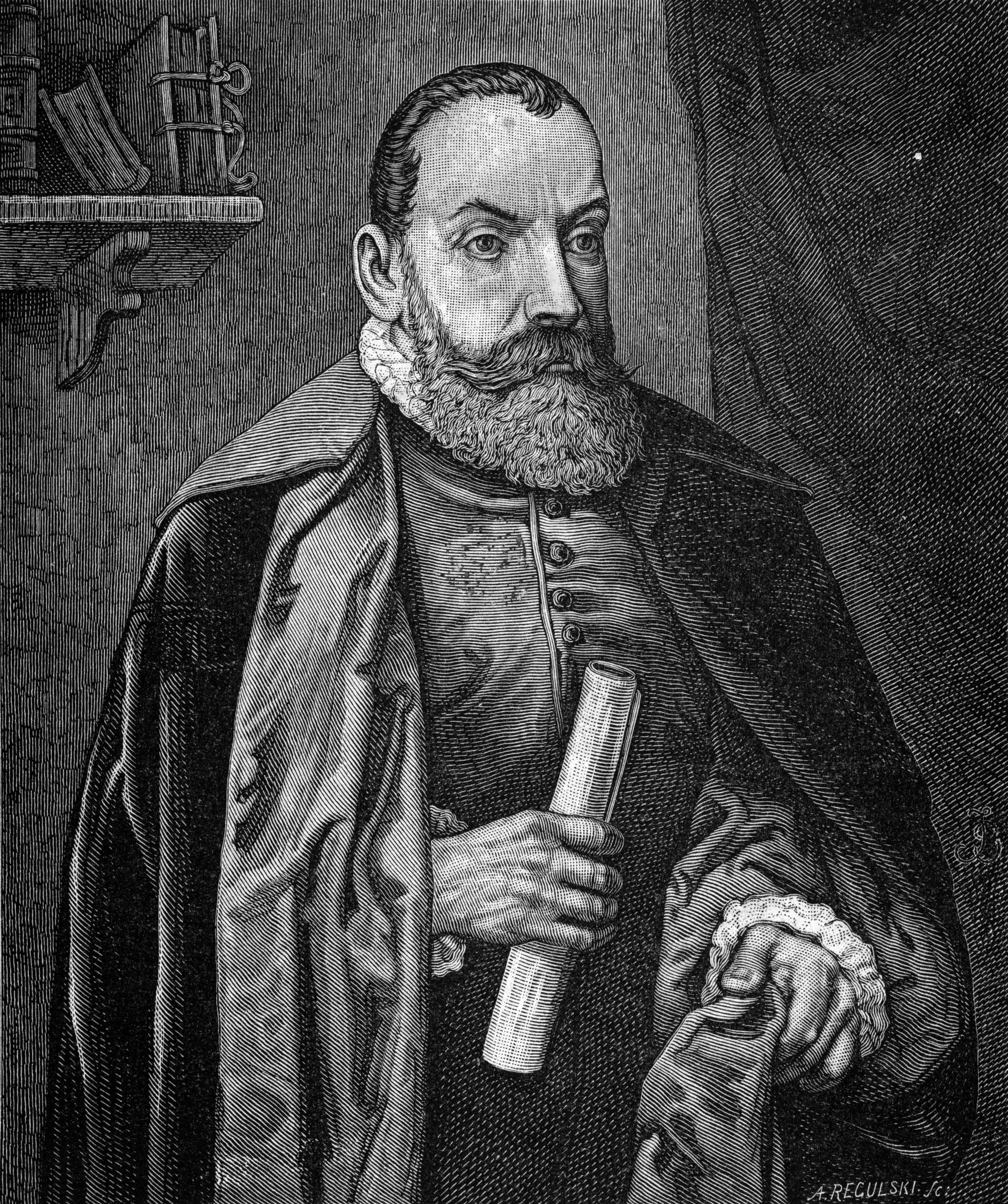
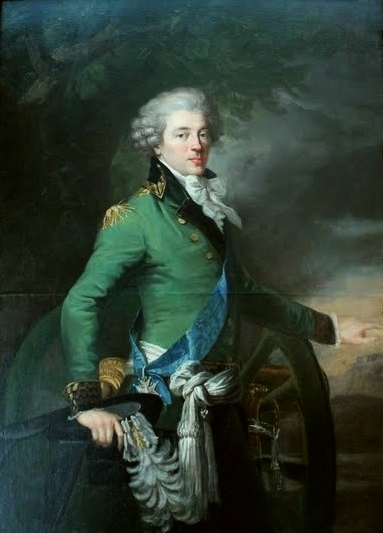
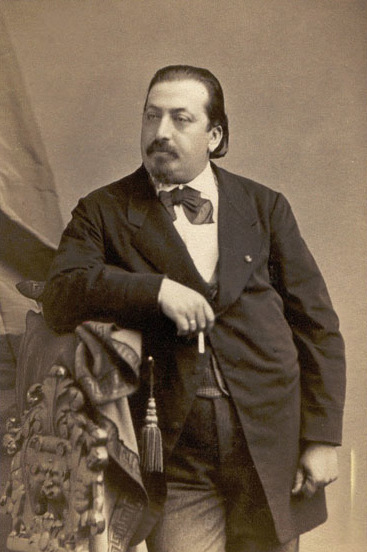
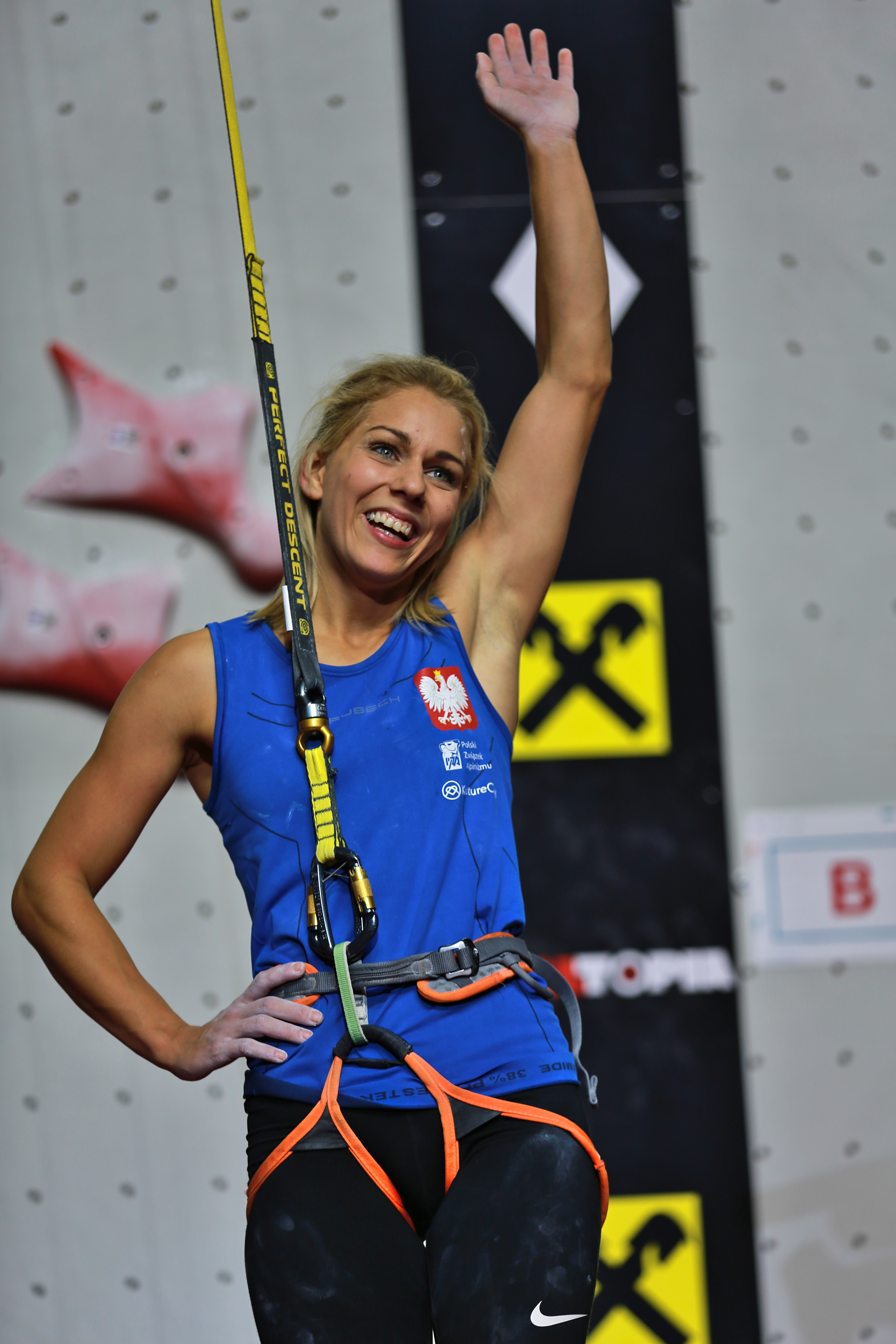
Clockwise: Jan Kochanowski, Stanisław Kostka Potocki, Aleksandra Mirosław, and Henryk Wieniawski
- Biernat z Lublina (~1465-~1529), Polish poet, fabulist, translator and physician
- Naphtali Hirsch Altschuler (16th–17th centuries), Talmudic scholar and writer
- Franciszka Arnsztajnowa (1865–1942), née Meyerson, poet, playwright and translator
- Jacek Bąk, Polish footballer and captain of Poland during World Cup 2006
- Józef Czechowicz, (1903–1939), poet, writer and editor
- Katarzyna Dolinska, contestant on Cycle 10 of America's Next Top Model. She came in 5th place.
- Rabbi Jacob ben Ephraim (unknown–1648), "The Gaon Rabbi Jacob of Lublin"
- Rabbi Joshua Falk (1555–1614), also known as Joshua ben Alexander HaCohen Falk
- Rabbi Shneur Zalman Fradkin (1830–1902), "The Toras Chessed"
- Rabbi Aryeh Tzvi Frumer (1884–1943), "The Kozhiglover Rav", Holocaust victim
- Rafał Gan-Ganowicz (1932–2002), mercenary, journalist and activist
- Jacob Glatstein (1896–1971), literary critic
- Alter Mojze Goldman (1909–1988), resistance fighter
- Rabbi Zadok HaKohen Rabinowitz (1823–1900)
- Kitty Hart-Moxon (born 1926), Holocaust survivor
- Julia Hartwig (1921–2017), poet, writer and translator
- Paweł Holc (born 1971), footballer
- Anna Iberszer (born 1976), actress, dancer, and choreographer
- Rabbi Moses Isserles (1520–1572), "Rema"
- Jann (born 1999), singer-songwriter
- Sebastian Klonowic (1545–1602), Polish poet and composer
- Jan Kochanowski (1530–1584), Polish Renaissance poet
- Józef Ignacy Kraszewski (1812–1887), Polish writer, publisher, historian, journalist, scholar, political activist, painter and author
- Szymon Ładniak (born 2003), racing driver
- Anna Langfus (1920–1966), née Anna Szternfinkiel, writer, Prix de Goncourt winner in 1966
- Felix Lembersky (1913–1970), artist and painter
- Janusz Lewandowski (1951–), MEP, former minister of privatisation
- Rabbi Solomon Luria (1510–1573), "The Maharshal"
- Aleksandra Mirosław (born 1994), speed climber
- Marcin Narwojsz (born 1976), retired footballer
- Wincenty Pol (1807–1872), poet and geographer
- Rabbi Jacob Pollak (1460–1541)
- Stanisław Kostka Potocki (1755–1821), Polish nobleman, politician and writer
- Rabbi Sholom Rokeach (1781–1855), "Sar Sholom", the first Belzer Rebbe
- Yitzhak Sadeh (born Isaac Landsberg; 1890–1952), a founder of the Israel Defense Forces
- Mateusz Sawrymowicz (born 1987), swimmer
- Rabbi Shalom Shachna (unknown–1558)
- Rabbi Meir Shapiro (1887–1933), "The Lubliner Rav"
- Rabbi Joel Sirkis (1561–1640), also known as Joel ben Samuel Sirkis
- Anna Sobolak (born 1979), Polish politician and businessperson
- Bartosz Staszewski (1990–), activist and filmmaker
- Patryk Szysz (1998–), Polish professional footballer
- Dominik Tarczyński (born 1979), Member of European Parliament
- Bronisława Wajs (1908–1987), Polish-Romani poet and singer
- Henryk Wieniawski (1835–1880), violinist, born in Lublin
- Tomasz Wójtowicz (1953–2022), volleyball player, Olympic champion
- Rabbi Yaakov Yitzchak of Lublin (1745–1815), "The Seer of Lublin"
- Rabbi Mordecai Yoffe (1530–1612), "The Levush"
- Krzysztof Zalewski (born 1984), singer-songwriter
- Władysław Żmuda (born 1954), Polish former professional footballer, four-time World Cup participant
- Johann Hermann Zukertort (1842–1888), chess grand master
- Henio Zytomirski (1933–1942), Holocaust victim

== See also ==
- Church of the Holy Myrrh-Bearing Women, Lublin
- Lublin Triangle
- Lublin Renaissance
- Lublin Holocaust Memorial
- Lublin Department (Polish: Departament Lubelski): a unit of administrative division and local government in Poland's Duchy of Warsaw, 1806–15
- Vilnius–Lublin Portal
- Old Jewish Cemetery, Lublin
- Cathedral of the Transfiguration, Lublin
- Tourism in Poland
- Union of Lublin (painting)
- Missionary Church and Monastery, Lublin
- Urban Highline Festival Lublin
