= Executions in Rury Jezuickie =

Mass executions of Polish citizens carried out by German occupiers

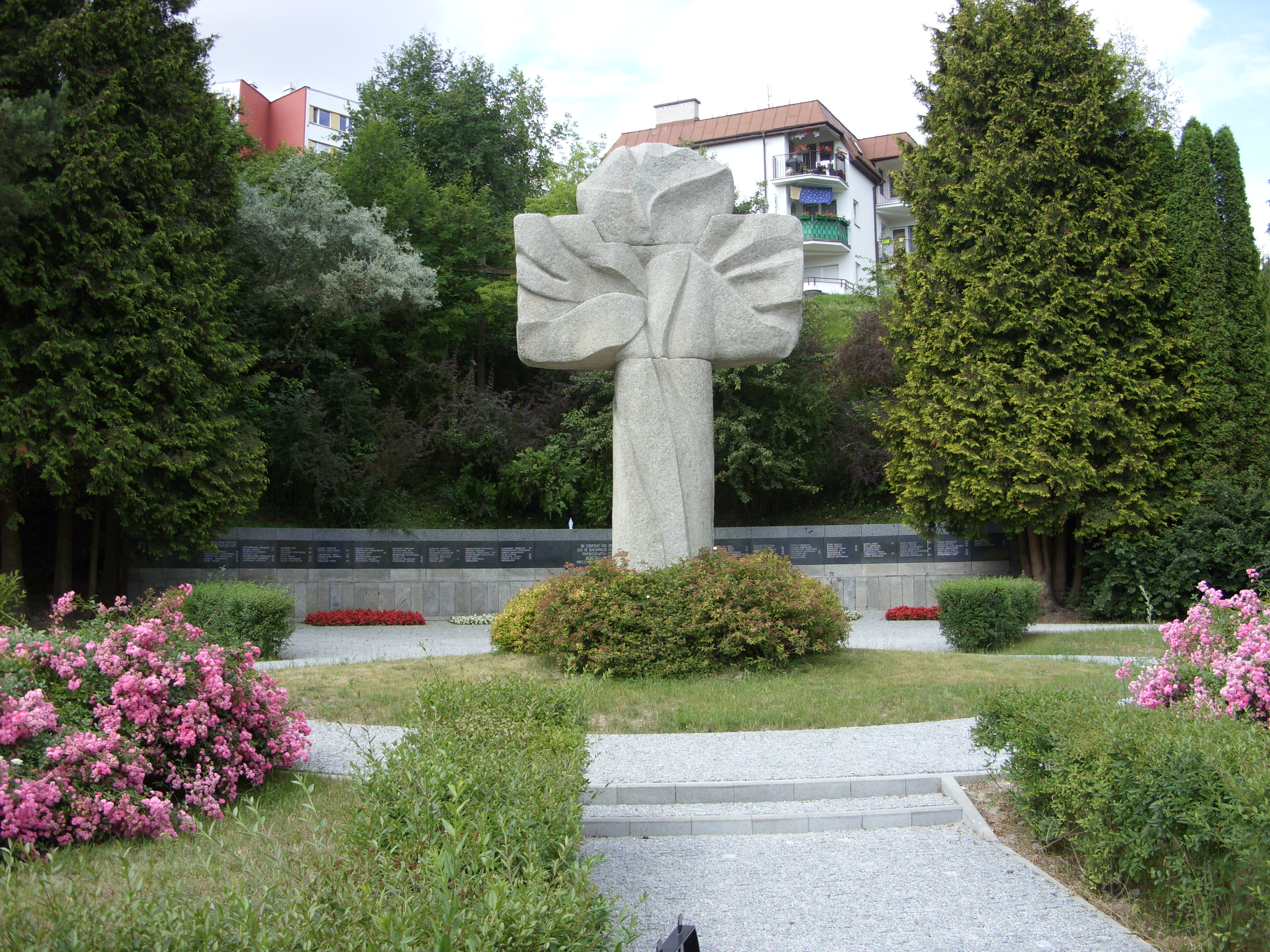
- Memorial monument honoring the victims of the executions, located in Rury Park in Lublin
- Location: Rury, Lublin; Poland
- Date: 29 June – 15 August 1940
- Attack type: execution by shooting
- Deaths: 450–500
- Perpetrators: SS, Ordnungspolizei

Executions in Rury Jezuickie were mass executions of Polish citizens carried out by German occupiers during the summer of 1940 near the village of Rury Jezuickie, located outside Lublin.

A nearby ravine, commonly known as "Doły", was selected by the Germans as the site for the executions of Polish political prisoners. Between 29 June and 15 August 1940, SS officers and Ordnungspolizei conducted five executions there, murdering at least 450 Poles transported from the prison at Lublin Castle. Among the victims were primarily members of the Polish political and intellectual elite from the Lublin Voivodeship, arrested as part of the so-called AB-Aktion.

== First repressions against the Polish intelligentsia in Lublin ==
From the very onset of the German occupation, Nazi terror was primarily directed at representatives of the Polish political and intellectual elite. According to the racist stereotype of Poles prevalent in the Third Reich, Nazi leaders believed that national consciousness was limited to the Polish intelligentsia, while the general populace was concerned only with daily survival and indifferent to the fate of the state. For this reason, it was assumed that exterminating the so-called "leadership class" would destroy Polish national identity and transform Polish society into a passive, amorphous mass, suitable at best as unskilled labor for the Third Reich. As part of the so-called Intelligenzaktion carried out in occupied Polish territories between September 1939 and spring 1940, the Nazis murdered at least 100,000 Polish citizens.

In Lublin, the largest such operation – later termed Sonderaktion Lublin by Polish historians – took place in the first half of November 1939. The Germans arrested several hundred individuals, including 16 faculty members from the Catholic University of Lublin and numerous Catholic clergy, such as members of the bishop's curia, ecclesiastical court, and chapter, as well as priest-lecturers from Lublin's seminary. Most of those detained were eventually released. However, several dozen individuals were deported to concentration camps, while nearly 70 prisoners were executed by the Germans at clay pits near a brickworks in the Lemszczyzna district or within the grounds of the Old Jewish Cemetery.

== Beginning of the AB-Aktion in the Lublin District ==
In the spring of 1940, the Germans realized that, despite the intensive extermination campaigns conducted in all districts of the General Government, Polish society was recovering from the shock of the September defeat, and resistance activity was intensifying. The start of the German offensive in the West diverted the attention of global public opinion away from events in Poland, prompting the General Government authorities to take advantage of the situation by launching a large-scale terror operation once again targeting the Polish intelligentsia and social elites.

On 16 May 1940, a conference was held in Kraków regarding "extraordinary measures necessary to ensure peace and order in the General Government". During the meeting, Governor-General Hans Frank tasked SS-Brigadeführer Bruno Streckenbach, head of the SD and Sicherheitspolizei in the General Government, with conducting an "extraordinary pacification action". At a subsequent conference on 30 May 1940, Frank clarified that the goal of the AB-Aktion would be the "accelerated liquidation of most rebellious politicians in our hands, those preaching resistance, and other politically suspect individuals, as well as the simultaneous end to traditional Polish criminality". It was decided that detainees should not be sent to concentration camps but rather "liquidated on the spot in the simplest manner". Streckenbach estimated that at least 3,500 people, considered the "flower of Polish intelligentsia and resistance", as well as several thousand criminal offenders, would be murdered during the AB-Aktion.

In May 1940, Fritz Saurmann, the urban district governor, ordered employees of the Lublin Municipal Administration to compile a list of "significant officials of the Municipal Administration as well as lawyers, pharmacists, and other prominent individuals in the city". Lublin's mayor, Roman Ślaski, firmly refused to comply with this demand. Ultimately, the list of "suspect lawyers" was prepared and handed over to the Gestapo by the head of the internal affairs department of the district governor's office.

Beginning in mid-June, raids and mass arrests were organized in almost all towns within the district. These actions primarily targeted Polish social and political activists, teachers, lawyers, civil servants, and Roman Catholic priests. For example:

- 20–22 June 1940: nearly 200 members of the local intelligentsia in Zamość were arrested and imprisoned in the Ordnungspolizei detention center set up at the Zamość Rotunda.
- 24 June 1940: a large-scale raid in Lublin, led by the German 104th Police Battalion, supported by SD operatives and members of the paramilitary Sonderdienst, resulted in the arrest of 814 men aged 18 to 60 from various city districts.
- Same day: over 40 Polish teachers in Biała Podlaska were deceitfully arrested after being summoned to a supposed meeting at the local county office.
- 26 June 1940: another major raid in Lubartów led to the detention of over 500 people.

Mass arrests also occurred in Chełm (10–11 June and 3–4 July), Puławy, Janów Lubelski, Radzyń Podlaski, and smaller towns throughout the district. These operations marked the brutal onset of the AB-Aktion in the Lublin District.

== Course of the extermination operation ==
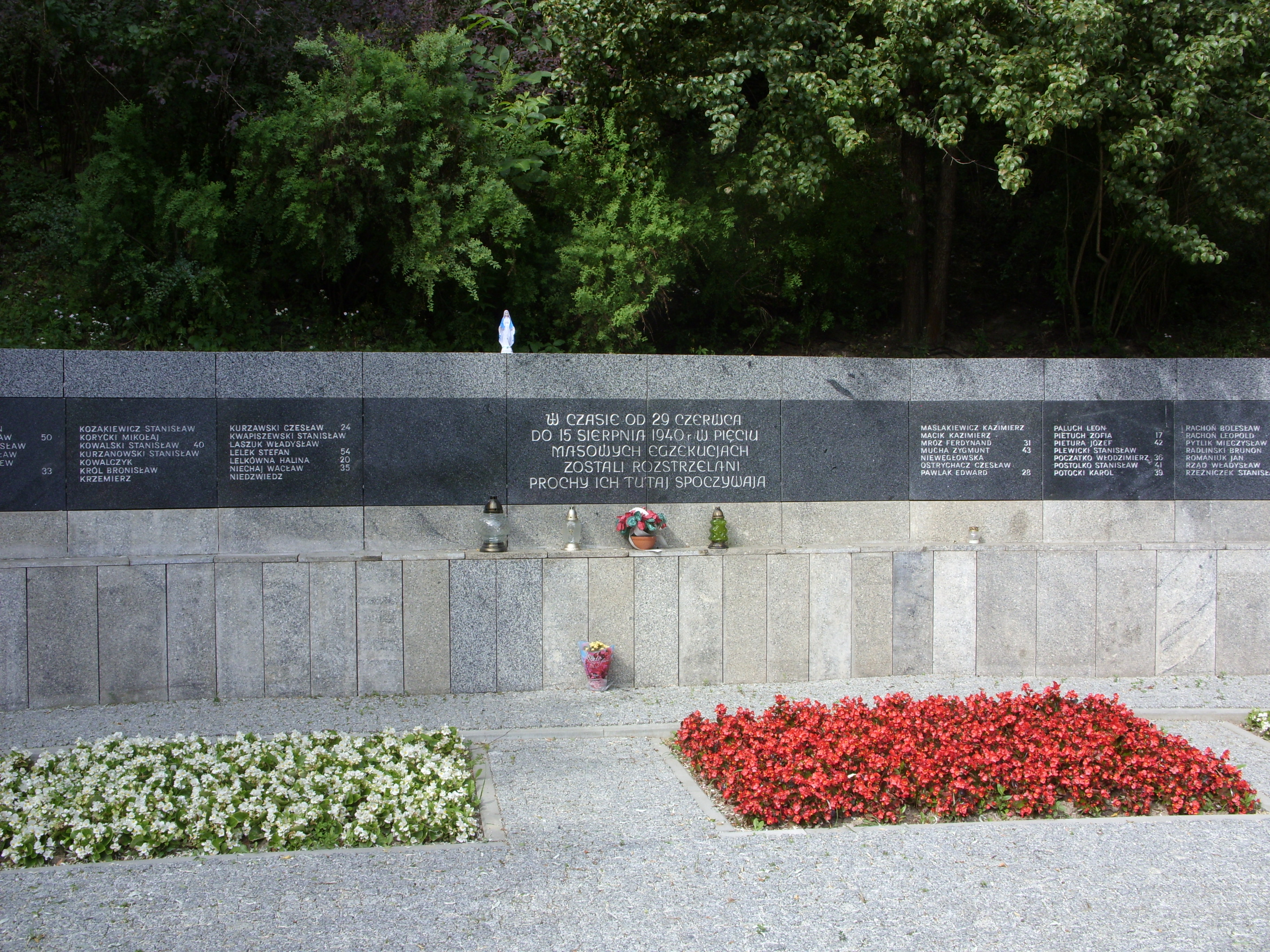
Memorial and mass grave in Rury Park

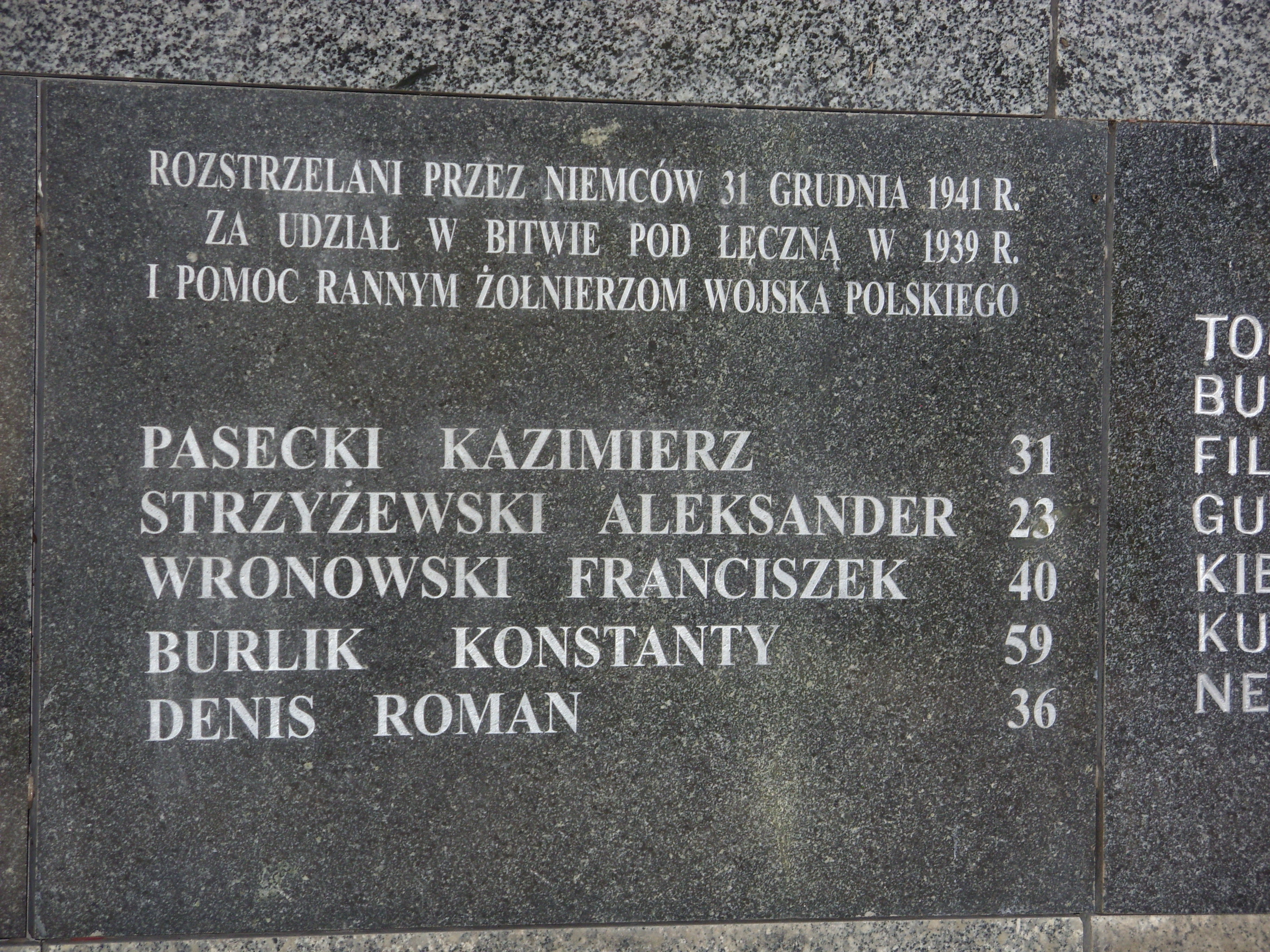
Plaques with the names of the victims

After short stays in local prisons and detention centers, detained Poles were typically transferred to the prison in Lublin Castle. Under normal conditions, its cells could accommodate approximately 700 prisoners, but it quickly became overcrowded. This was one of the reasons why large transports to concentration camps soon departed from Lublin. In June and July 1940, nearly 1,000 prisoners were sent from Lublin Castle to the Sachsenhausen concentration camp. In October, a transport of 65 prisoners was sent to the Auschwitz concentration camp. According to directives from the General Government authorities, some prisoners were subjected to immediate extermination. Those sentenced to death by summary police courts were executed in the so-called "ditches" near the village of Rury Jezuickie – a small ravine located about 3.5 kilometers from Lublin's city center (now part of Rury Park, situated on the border of the B. Prus housing estate and the Czuby district). After the war, Polish investigators discovered five parallel mass graves there, each 17 meters long and 2 meters deep. The extermination operation in Rury Jezuickie was conducted between 29 June and 15 August 1940. The first executions occurred on 29 June and 3 July. The dates of two subsequent massacres remain unknown, though they are believed to have taken place between 4 July and 15 August. The last execution was carried out on 15 August.

The course of executions in Rury Jezuickie has been partially reconstructed based on witness testimonies, post-war exhumation findings, and secret messages smuggled out by prisoners of Lublin Castle. Victims were taken from their cells and transported by truck to Rury Jezuickie. The condemned were forced to lie down during the journey to the execution site. Executions were carried out at night, under the illumination of vehicle headlights. The victims were led in groups of five to the edge of pre-dug graves and shot with automatic weapons. Some graves were later found to contain 2 or 3 layers of bodies. Before their deaths, some victims had their hands tied or were blindfolded. Some bore signs of blunt-force trauma to the head, suggesting that individuals who showed signs of life may have been buried alive.

The most information is available about the first execution on 29 June 1940. According to a secret message from a prisoner at Lublin Castle, 45 people were executed that day. The names of 34 victims have been identified, including:

- Stefan Lelek-Sowa (judge of the Court of Appeals in Lublin, co-organizer of the Lublin Service for Poland's Victory and the Union of Armed Struggle),
- Halina Lelkówna (student of the Catholic University of Lublin, liaison officer of the Lublin Union of Armed Struggle),
- Józef Dederko (judge of the District Court in Lublin),
- Tadeusz Eysmont (physician, co-founder of the Lublin Union of the White Eagle),
- Celina Iwanowska (scout, head of communications for the Lublin Union of Armed Struggle),
- Zbigniew Klaudel (lawyer, editor of the weekly Prawda published in Zamość),
- Bolesław Wnuk (member of the Polish Sejm).

Subsequent executions on 3 July and 15 August primarily targeted members of the Union of Armed Struggle resistance from the Janów County area. Among those executed were:

- Błażej Dzikowski (Sejm member, member of the Union of Armed Struggle "political trio" in Janów County),
- Zbigniew Ślęk (Captain of the Polish Armed Forces),
- Józef Pitura (employee of the Polichna municipal office, head of the local Union of Armed Struggle branch),
- Father Władysław Bocian (parson in Suchowola),
- Kazimierz Sierakowski (police commander in Janów Lubelski).

The people of Lublin quickly became aware of the executions taking place in Rury Jezuickie. Some secretly adorned the execution site with flowers. On All Souls' Day in 1940, an anonymous individual even placed a metal plaque there with a white eagle painted on it and the inscription "Honor to the Heroes".

=== Victims ===
An exhumation conducted at the execution site in 1945 uncovered the remains of over 450 victims. Historians generally estimate that between 450 and 500 Poles were murdered in Rury Jezuickie. The victims were primarily members of the Polish political and intellectual elite from the Lublin Voivodeship, including women and Catholic clergy. However, workers, farmers, police officers, prison guards, and school-age youth were also among those executed. While it is possible that Polish criminal offenders were also executed as part of the AB-Aktion, there is no conclusive evidence to support this theory.

A complete list of the victims from Rury Jezuickie has not yet been compiled. Approximately 100 names have been identified, with the Council for the Protection of Struggle and Martyrdom Sites reporting 115 victims. Among them were:

- Politicians:
  - Błażej Dzikowski (Sejm member from the Polish People's Party "Wyzwolenie", cooperative activist),
  - Bolesław Wnuk (farmer, mayor of Wysokie near Zamość, Sejm member).
- Lawyers:
  - Józef Dederko (District Court judge in Lublin),
  - Zbigniew Klaudel (lawyer, editor of the weekly Prawda published in Zamość),
  - Stefan Lelek-Sowa (Court of Appeals judge in Lublin, co-organizer of the Lublin Service for Poland's Victory and the Union of Armed Struggle),
  - Józef Wiśniewski (District Court judge in Lublin).
- Teachers:
  - Józef Kosior,
  - Józef Pucek (teacher from Kąkolewnica),
  - Bolesław Salamacha (teacher from Dzierzkowice-Rynek).
- Military officers and soldiers:
  - Major Zygmunt Mucha,
  - Captain Zbigniew Ślęk,
  - Captain Jan Śliwiński,
  - Sergeant Roman Jagielski.
- Catholic clergy:
  - Father Władysław Bocian (parson from Suchowola).
- Civil servants:
  - Jan Gutek,
  - Stanisław Kurzanowski (communal savings bank employee in Janów Lubelski),
  - Stanisław Kwapiszewski,
  - Kazimierz Mącik (Lublin municipal office employee),
  - Józef Pitura (municipal office employee in Polichna, Union of Armed Struggle branch commander),
  - Karol Potocki (mayor of Modliborzyce, Union of Armed Struggle branch commander),
  - Bolesław Rachoń (secretary in Gmina Dzierzkowice).
- Engineers:
  - Mieczysław Ciepłowski (engineer from Janów Lubelski, arrested for possessing a radio station),
  - Celina Iwanowska (engineer, Polish Scouting and Guiding Association activist, head of communications for the Lublin Union of Armed Struggle).
- Doctors:
  - Tadeusz Eysmont (co-founder of the Lublin headquarters of the Union of the White Eagle),
  - Jan Głodkowski (doctor from Szczekarków),
  - Wacław Niechaj (doctor at the Social Insurance Institution in Lublin),
  - Jan Paradowski,
  - Stanisław Postolko (county doctor in Lublin, vice-president of the local Polish Red Cross),
  - Kazimierz Żurawski (doctor at the military hospital in Chełm, Polish Armed Forces major).
- Police officers and prison guards:
  - Wincenty Samoń (guard at Lublin Castle),
  - Kazimierz Sierakowski (police commander in Janów Lubelski).
- Students:
  - Halina Lelek (Catholic University of Lublin student, daughter of Stefan Lelek-Sowa, Lublin Union of Armed Struggle liaison officer),
  - Irena Niewęgłowska (student),
  - Brunon Redliński (high school student, Stanisław Staszic High School in Lublin),
  - Stanisław Rzeźniczek (Catholic University of Lublin student),
  - Jan Świerczyński (student).
- Others:
  - Konstanty Burlik (worker),
  - Aleksander Grabowski (merchant from Urzędów),
  - Stanisław Kowalski (merchant),
  - Edward Tomaszewski (estate administrator in Moniaki).

Historian Józef Marszałek noted that many of the victims were veterans of the Polish Military Organization who were active in anti-German underground resistance (e.g., members of Stefan Lelek-Sowa's network). However, several prominent individuals in the local community escaped immediate execution. Drawing broader conclusions about the criteria used by the Lublin Gestapo to select prisoners during the AB-Aktion remains challenging, as only about 20% of those executed have been identified.

== After the war ==
Between 4 and 11 October 1945, exhumation efforts in Rury Jezuickie were conducted by the Municipal Commission for the Investigation of German Crimes. Representatives of the Polish Red Cross, the prosecutor's office, the Roman Catholic Church, the press, and municipal authorities were also present. Five mass graves were discovered, containing approximately 70, 120, 80, 130, and 50 bodies, respectively. Due to the advanced state of decomposition, only six victims were identified: Józef Dederko, Jan Gutek, Celina Iwanowska, Stanisław Kowalski, Halina Lelek, and Stanisław Rzeźniczek. Their remains were returned to their families for burial in Lublin cemeteries, while the rest were interred at the site of the executions.

A granite monument now stands on the mass grave in the Rury Park. In front of the monument is a plaque inscribed with two Grunwald Crosses on the left and a dedication on the right: "In memory of the 500 prisoners of Lublin Castle who perished here at the hands of the Nazi occupiers during mass executions from June to August 1940". Behind the monument, at the base of a slope, there is a wall displaying plaques with the names of the victims. One plaque bears the inscription: "Between 29 June and 15 August 1940, they were executed in five mass executions. Their ashes rest here".

== Accountability of perpetrators ==
Responsibility for the actions carried out in the spring and summer of 1940 by the German security apparatus in Lublin, including the executions at Rury Jezuickie, primarily lies with Ernst Zörner, Governor of the Lublin District, and SS-Brigadeführer Odilo Globocnik, the then-SS and Police Leader in the district. Globocnik committed suicide in May 1945 shortly after being captured by British soldiers. Ernst Zörner disappeared without a trace, likely committing suicide in 1945.

A particularly significant role in the extermination operation at Rury Jezuickie was played by SS-Sturmbannführer Walter Huppenkothen, who reported directly to Zörner and Globocnik. As the commander of the SD and Sicherheitspolizei in Lublin, Huppenkothen was personally responsible for implementing AB-Aktion in the Lublin District. He also presided over the summary police court, which sentenced Polish political prisoners to death. After the war, Huppenkothen settled in West Germany. He was sentenced to six years in prison for his involvement in the persecution of members of the German anti-Nazi resistance. Upon his release in 1959, he became a respected expert in commercial law. He died in 1979 in Lübeck.

== Bibliography ==
- Mańkowski, Zygmunt, ed. (1992). Ausserordentliche Befriedungsaktion 1940 – akcja AB na ziemiach polskich: materiały z sesji naukowej (6-7 listopada 1986 r.) [Extraordinary Pacification Action 1940 – AB Aktion in Polish Territories: Materials from the Scientific Session (6–7 November 1986)] (in Polish). Warsaw: Zakład Historii Najnowszej Uniwersytetu Marii Skłodowskiej-Curie.
- Wardzyńska, Maria (2009). Był rok 1939. Operacja niemieckiej policji bezpieczeństwa w Polsce. Intelligenzaktion [It Was the Year 1939. The German Security Police Operation in Poland. Intelligenzaktion] (in Polish). Warsaw: Instytut Pamięci Narodowej. ISBN 978-83-7629-063-8.
