= Sonderaktion Lublin =

Repressive operation targeting Lublin's intelligentsia by Nazi Germany

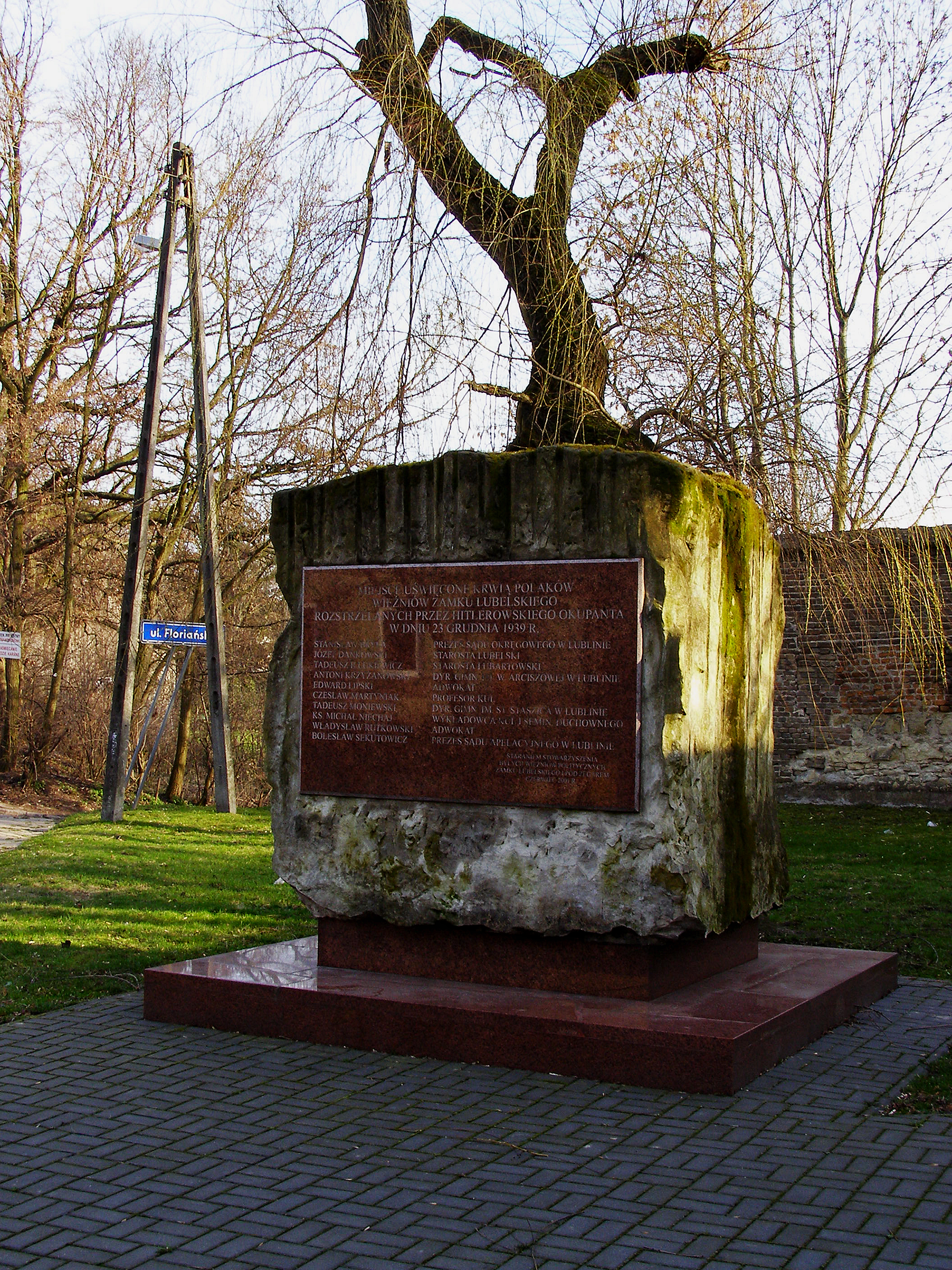
- Monument in memory of the victims of the execution on 23 December 1939
- Location: 51°15′N 22°34′E; Lublin, Poland (occupied by Nazi Germany – General Government)
- Date: Autumn 1939
- Attack type: Repression
- Deaths: Approx. 70
- Perpetrator: Nazi Germany

Sonderaktion Lublin was a repressive operation targeting the intelligentsia of Lublin, conducted by German occupiers in November 1939.

The operation began with mass arrests, affecting several hundred members of Lublin's social and intellectual elite. The Germans detained, among others, two bishops and members of the Archdiocese of Lublin's curia, all faculty members of the Catholic University of Lublin present in the city, as well as numerous teachers, lawyers, and officials. Most prisoners were eventually released, but approximately 70 Poles were executed, and several dozen others were deported to concentration camps. The term Sonderaktion Lublin was coined by Polish historians to describe these events.

== Background ==
From the outset of the occupation, German terror primarily targeted representatives of Poland's political and intellectual elites. According to the racist stereotype of Poles prevalent in Nazi Germany, Nazi leaders believed that only the Polish intelligentsia possessed national consciousness, while the broader populace was preoccupied with daily survival and indifferent to the fate of the state. Consequently, the Nazis assumed that the extermination of the so-called "leadership class" would destroy Polish national identity, reducing the population to an amorphous mass suitable only for unskilled forced labour in service of the Third Reich. As part of the so-called Intelligenzaktion, conducted across occupied Polish territories between September 1939 and spring 1940, the Germans killed at least 100,000 Polish citizens.

In Lublin, the initial weeks of German occupation were relatively calm. The Germans permitted the reopening of secondary and primary schools and allowed the academic year to commence at the Catholic University of Lublin. Cinemas and theatres resumed operations, and the publication of the Lublin Express newspaper was restarted. As a result, the population of the Lublin region initially believed that the German occupation would resemble the austere Austrian occupation of 1915–1918. Nevertheless, within the first weeks of the occupation, the Germans committed atrocities against the local population. In October 1939, the pre-war Lublin Voivode, Jerzy Albin de Tramecourt, was arrested and killed under unknown circumstances. Executions of Poles accused of possessing weapons also occurred in several locations across the Lublin region, including Kock, Lubartów, and Szczuczki near Poniatowa.

== Course of the operation ==
In early November 1939, the Germans began preparations for a large-scale repressive operation targeting Lublin's social and intellectual elite. Polish historians later named this operation Sonderaktion Lublin. The operation effectively marked the beginning of the tenure of SS-Brigadeführer Odilo Globocnik, who assumed the role of SS and Police Leader in the Lublin District on 9 November 1939. It also fulfilled the threats of Arthur Seyss-Inquart, deputy governor-general, who, during a rally for Volksdeutsche at the Agricultural Bank at 15 Chopin Street in Lublin, (Note: Sources provide conflicting dates for this rally. Mańkowski (1992, p. 48) cites 25 October 1939. Moszyński & Policha (1964, pp. 21–22) indicate an unspecified day in October 1939. Conversely, Kasperek (1989, p. 36) states that Arthur Seyss-Inquart visited Lublin on 23 November.) announced a crackdown on the Polish intelligentsia and Jews. Sonderaktion Lublin was not merely a local operation. With Polish Independence Day approaching, the Germans conducted "preventive" arrests and executions across nearly all regions of occupied Poland. The operation bore particular similarities to the arrests of professors at Kraków universities a few days earlier, known as Sonderaktion Krakau.

Fearing Polish resistance, the Germans reinforced guards at the Lublin Castle prison, as well as security at the Lublin railway station and food warehouses on 6 November 1939. The operation is considered to have begun on 9 November 1939, when the Germans arrested several hundred members of the intelligentsia in Lublin, including lawyers, engineers, clergy, and teachers from secondary, primary, and the Lublin Pedagogium schools. Among those detained were the rector of the Catholic University of Lublin, Father Antoni Szymański, and the Catholic University of Lublin professor Father Zdzisław Goliński. At the Lublin courts, the Germans arrested the president of the District Court, Stanisław Bryła; the president of the Appellate Court, Bolesław Sekutowicz; and the vice-presidents of both courts. Many teachers were deceptively arrested after being invited to an alleged meeting at the Agricultural Bank. Others were taken directly from classrooms and offices at the Jan Zamoyski High School. Victims also included former members of the Civic Guard, established in September 1939. A roundup took place at Krakowskie Przedmieście Street.

Arrests continued in the following days. On 11 November, the Germans detained 14 Catholic University of Lublin faculty members, including the seriously ill Father Professor Piotr Kremer and Professor Władysław Kuraszkiewicz, as well as Professors Father Józef Kruszyński, Ignacy Czuma, and Czesław Martyniak. On 15 November, the occupation authorities officially dissolved the Lublin school district curatorium. On 17 November, the Catholic University of Lublin was closed, and 60 of its students were arrested (the university building was subsequently used as barracks and later converted into a military hospital). That same day, the Gestapo stormed the Bishop's Curia building, claiming that weapons were hidden in its garden. They arrested Bishop Marian Leon Fulman, the diocesan bishop of Lublin, Bishop Władysław Goral, the auxiliary bishop, and 11 other clergy present at the time. The Germans also seized the curia's assets. Further arrests of teachers occurred on 23 and 25 November, and Polish secondary education was officially abolished. Repressions against the Catholic clergy continued. In late November, arrests took place at the convent of student priests at the Catholic University of Lublin, including the convent's director, Father Stanisław Wojsa. On 25 January 1940, 23 Capuchins were arrested in Lublin, (Note: Eight priests and 15 seminarians (Kasperek (1989, p. 47)).) and on 2 February, 43 Jesuits were detained, accused of sheltering Polish officers, hiding weapons, and belonging to secret organizations.

According to Zofia Leszczyńska's calculations, approximately 250 people were arrested in Lublin during the November Sonderaktion. Józef Marszałek and Maria Wardzyńska refer to "several hundred arrested". The detainees included:

- 16 Catholic University of Lublin faculty members;
- 36 secondary school professors;
- 44 primary school teachers;
- 7 judges from the Appellate and District Courts;
- 24 lawyers;
- over 100 Catholic clergy (including two bishops, members of the bishop's curia, ecclesiastical court, and chapter, as well as priest-lecturers from the Lublin seminary).

As arrests continued in subsequent months and extended to other cities in the Lublin District (Chełm, Hrubieszów, Krasnystaw, Lubartów, Łęczna, and Zamość), some sources estimate the total number of Poles arrested during Sonderaktion Lublin at around 2,000.

== Fate of the detainees ==
Poles arrested during Sonderaktion Lublin were held in the cells of Lublin Castle. Between December 1939 and June 1940, most were released. However, approximately 70 Poles were executed, and several dozen were deported to concentration camps (these figures refer to those arrested in Lublin between 9 and 20 November 1939). Among those deported were Professor Władysław Kuraszkiewicz, Father Stanisław Wojsa, and six Lublin teachers.

Ten days after their arrest, Bishop Marian Fulman, Bishop Władysław Goral, and 11 priests arrested with them faced a German summary court. After a sham trial, all were sentenced to death on charges of distributing illegal literature, possessing weapons, and organizing Polish demonstrations on 11 November. Following intervention by the Vatican, the German authorities were forced to commute the sentences. Governor-General Hans Frank "graciously" replaced the death penalty with life imprisonment, and on 3 December 1939, all 13 clergy were deported to the Sachsenhausen concentration camp. After 2.5 months, the 73-year-old Bishop Fulman was released and placed under house arrest in Nowy Sącz, where he remained until the end of the war. Bishop Władysław Goral was murdered in Sachsenhausen in early 1945. No other Catholic diocese in the General Government faced such extensive repression (similar treatment was reserved only for Polish clergy in the territories annexed to the Reich). The brutal crackdown on the Lublin diocese curia was likely a personal initiative of SS-Brigadeführer Globocnik. (Note: During a conference of senior officials in the General Government "government" on 2 December 1939, Hans Frank justified the brutal crackdown on the Lublin diocese curia as necessary for "total combat against all manifestations of resistance in the General Government" (Mańkowski (1992, p. 47)).)

On 23 December 1939, 10 prominent and respected Lublin citizens were taken from the Lublin Castle cells. To maintain appearances, two juvenile criminals were added to the group, and all were brought to the old Jewish cemetery at Sienna Street. There, in the light of car headlights, the 12 were shot over pre-dug graves. The victims included: Stanisław Bryła (president of the Lublin District Court, social activist), Bolesław Sekutowicz (president of the Appellate Court), Edward Lipski (lawyer, former Zamość and Tomaszów Lubelski starosta), Władysław Rutkowski (lawyer), Professor Czesław Martyniak (head of the philosophy of law department at KUL), Father Professor Michał Niechaj (lecturer in dogmatic theology at the Catholic University of Lublin and the Higher Seminary), Tadeusz Moniewski (director of Stanisław Staszic High School), Antoni Krzyżanowski (director of Wacława Arciszowa High School), Józef Dańkowski (starosta of Lublin County), and Tadeusz Illukiewicz (starosta of Lubartów County). The execution was carried out by members of the 102nd Police Battalion. Czesław Łuczak considered this crime the beginning of "systematic extermination of the Polish intelligentsia in the General Government". That same night, near a concrete plant beyond the railway bridge in Lubartów, members of the 102nd Police Battalion executed 48 Poles accused of publicly expressing patriotic sentiments on Polish Independence Day. Among the victims were residents of Brzeźnica Książęca, Kamionka, Rudzienko, and Kraczewo.

On 6 January 1940, another execution took place in Lublin. At the clay pits near the brick factory in the Lemszczyzna district, German police shot approximately 50 people, mostly residents of Kamionka, arrested on 15 November 1939 in retaliation for organizing a patriotic ceremony and a Mass for the Homeland on Polish Independence Day. The victims included Father Piotr Gintowt-Dziewałtowski (parish priest of Kamionka), Father Antoni Hunicz (vicar of Kamionka), Franciszek Mazurkiewicz (head of Gmina Kamionka), Michał Szadkowski (gmina's secretary), Franciszek Klamut (teacher), Marian Laskoś (teacher), Karol Cyfrowicz (teacher), Bronisław Smolak (student), Józef Wesołowski (student), and Zawadzki (pharmacist). Likely among the victims were also individuals arrested in Lublin and other district towns, including Father Wacław Kosior, parish priest of the Church of the Sending of the Holy Apostles in Chełm.

On 7 January, another execution occurred at the clay pits, where between 30 and 40 residents of Lublin's Dziesiąta district were shot, arrested the previous day in retaliation for a shooting on Bychawska Street that killed two Germans. On 12 February 1940, a large execution took place at the old Jewish cemetery in Lublin, where approximately 180 people were shot in the back of the head. Several of those killed had been arrested during Sonderaktion Lublin.

Sonderaktion Lublin was only the first stage of the extermination of the Polish intelligentsia in the pre-war Lublin Voivodeship. In June 1940, as part of the AB-Aktion, hundreds were arrested in Lublin and other district cities. Between 29 June and 15 August 1940, approximately 450–500 detainees were executed in Rury Jezuickie near Lublin, and by year's end, another thousand were deported to concentration camps. According to Zofia Leszczyńska's calculations, by the end of the occupation, 2,156 members of the Polish intelligentsia from the Lublin region had died due to German repression (data from 1992).

== Aftermath ==
For a long time, the only commemoration of Sonderaktion Lublin victims was a modest plaque on the Jewish cemetery wall. On 20 June 2001, at the initiative of the Association of Former Political Prisoners of Lublin Castle and "Pod Zegarem", a monument was unveiled on Kalinowszczyzna Street to commemorate the 12 Poles executed on Christmas Eve 1939. The monument, a rough stone block, bears a plaque inscribed: "A place sanctified by the blood of Poles, prisoners of Lublin Castle, executed by the Nazi occupier on 23 December 1939". The names of the victims are engraved on the plaque.

== Responsibility of the perpetrators ==
Responsibility for the actions of the German security apparatus in Lublin during the autumn and winter of 1939, including Sonderaktion Lublin, primarily falls on the governor of the Lublin District, Friedrich Schmidt; the SS and Police Leader in the Lublin District, SS-Brigadeführer Odilo Globocnik; and the commander of the SD and security police in the Lublin District, SS-Sturmbannführer Alfred Hasselberg.

Globocnik committed suicide in May 1945, shortly after being captured by British soldiers. In December 1939, Alfred Hasselberg was removed from his position and faced disciplinary proceedings for allegedly mistreating members of Einsatzkommando 3/I, which he commanded during the September Campaign. The investigation was eventually dropped, but Hasselberg's career in the SS ended. At his own request, he was transferred to the Wehrmacht. He survived the war and died of natural causes in 1950.

== Bibliography ==
- Kasperek, Józef (1989). Kronika wydarzeń w Lublinie w okresie okupacji hitlerowskiej [Chronicle of Events in Lublin During the Nazi Occupation] (in Polish). Lublin: Wydawnictwo Lubelskie. ISBN 83-222-0491-4.
- Mańkowski, Zygmunt, ed. (1992). Ausserordentliche Befriedungsaktion 1940 – akcja AB na ziemiach polskich: materiały z sesji naukowej (6-7 listopada 1986 r.) [Extraordinary Pedation Action 1940 – AB Action in Polish Lands: Materials from the Scientific Conference (6–7 November 1986)] (in Polish). Warsaw: Zakład Historii Najnowszej Uniwersytetu Marii Skłodowskiej-Curie.
- Mańkowski, Zygmunt, ed. (1988). Hitlerowskie więzienie na Zamku w Lublinie 1939-1944 [Nazi Prison at Lublin Castle 1939–1944] (in Polish). Lublin: Wydawnictwo Lubelskie. ISBN 83-222-0446-9.
- Mańkowski, Zygmunt, ed. (1989). Sonderaktion Lublin. Listopad 1939 [Sonderaktion Lublin. November 1939] (in Polish). Lublin: Zakład Historii Najnowszej UMCS & OKBZpNP-IPN w Lublinie. ISBN 83-227-0259-0.
- Moszyński, Remigiusz; Policha, Leopold (1964). Lublin w okresie okupacji (1939-1944) [Lublin During the Occupation (1939–1944)] (in Polish). Lublin: Wydawnictwo Lubelskie.
- Wardzyńska, Maria (2009). Był rok 1939. Operacja niemieckiej policji bezpieczeństwa w Polsce. Intelligenzaktion [The Year 1939. Operation of the German Security Police in Poland. Intelligenzaktion] (in Polish). Warsaw: Instytut Pamięci Narodowej. ISBN 978-83-7629-063-8.
