= Gestapo–NKVD conferences =

Police meetings organized by Germany and the Soviet Union

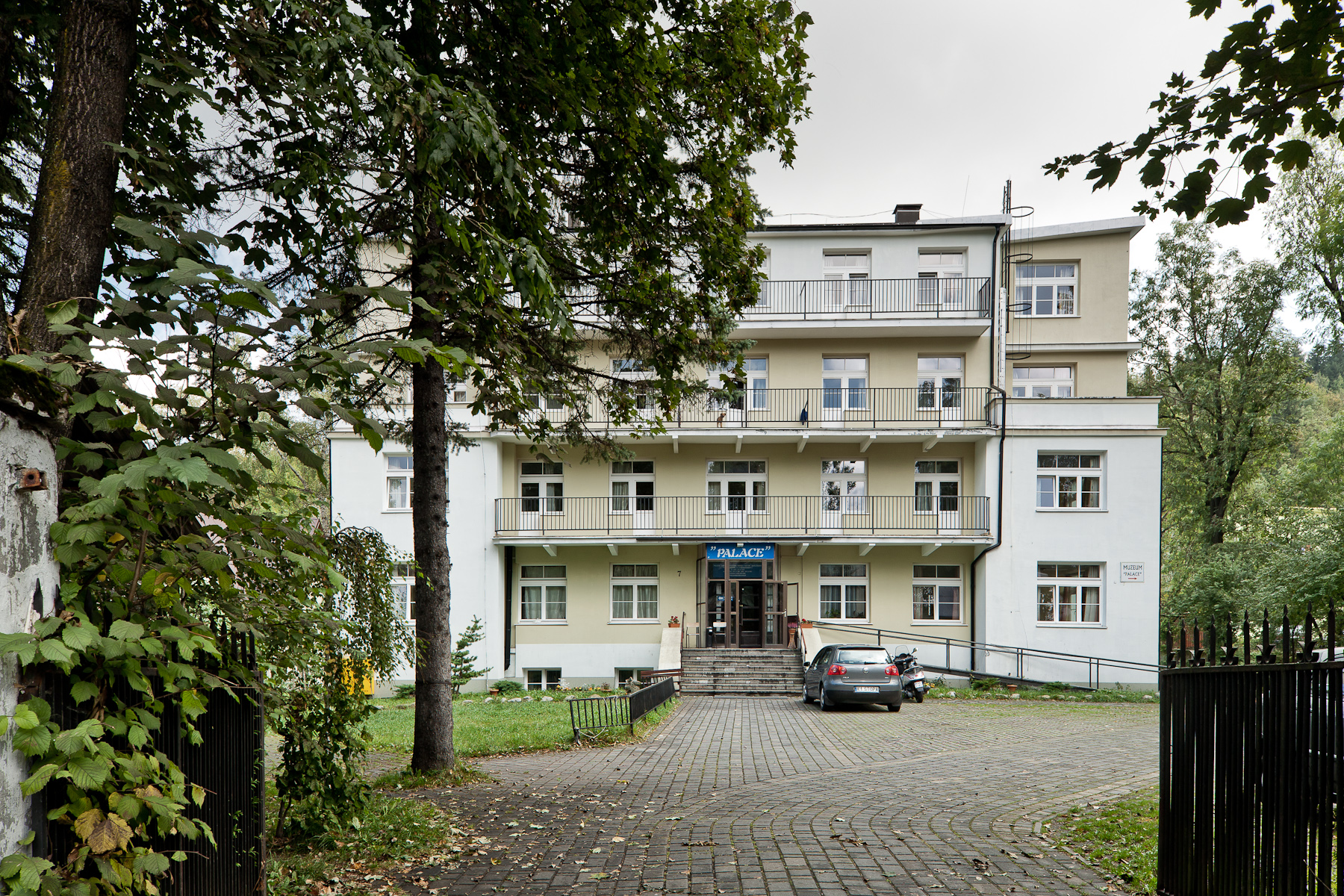
- Location of the 3rd Gestapo–NKVD conference inside the German torture house in the Polish mountains, the 'Palace' villa in Zakopane today
- Time: 27 September 1939 in Brześć; October 1939 in Lwów; November 1939 in Przemyśl; 6–7 December 1939 in Kraków; 8–9 December 1939 in Zakopane; 20 February 1940 in Zakopane; March 1940 in Kraków
- Duration: 1939–1940
- Type: German–Soviet bilateral planning for population exchange and the persecution of Polish nationals in occupied territories
- Theme: Security police talks
- Cause: Invasion of Poland (1939)

The Gestapo–NKVD conferences were a series of security police meetings organised in late 1939 and early 1940 by Germany and the Soviet Union, following the invasion of Poland in accordance with the Molotov–Ribbentrop Pact. The meetings enabled both parties to pursue specific goals and aims as outlined independently by Hitler and Stalin, with regard to the acquired, formerly Polish territories. The conferences were held by the Gestapo and the NKVD officials in several Polish cities. In spite of their differences on other issues, both Heinrich Himmler and Lavrentiy Beria had similar objectives as far as the fate of pre-war Poland was concerned. The objectives were agreed upon during signing of the German–Soviet Boundary and Friendship Treaty on 28 September 1939.

The attack on Poland ended with the German–Soviet military parade in Brest-Litovsk, which was held on 22 September 1939. Brześć was the location of the first German–Soviet meeting organised on 27 September 1939, in which the prisoner exchange was decided prior to the signing of mutual agreements in Moscow a day later. In the following month, the Gestapo and the NKVD met in Lwów to discuss the fate of civilian populations during the radical reorganisation of the annexed territories. They met again in occupied Przemyśl at the end of November, because Przemyśl was a border crossing between the two invaders. The next series of meetings began in December 1939, a month after the first transfer of Polish prisoners of war. The conferences were held in occupied Kraków in the General Government on 6–7 December 1939; and continued for the next two days in the resort town of Zakopane in the Tatra Mountains of southern Poland (100 km from Kraków) on 8–9 December 1939. The Zakopane Conference is the most remembered. From the Soviet side, several higher officers of the NKVD secret police participated in the meetings, while the German hosts provided a group of experts from the Gestapo.

== Background ==
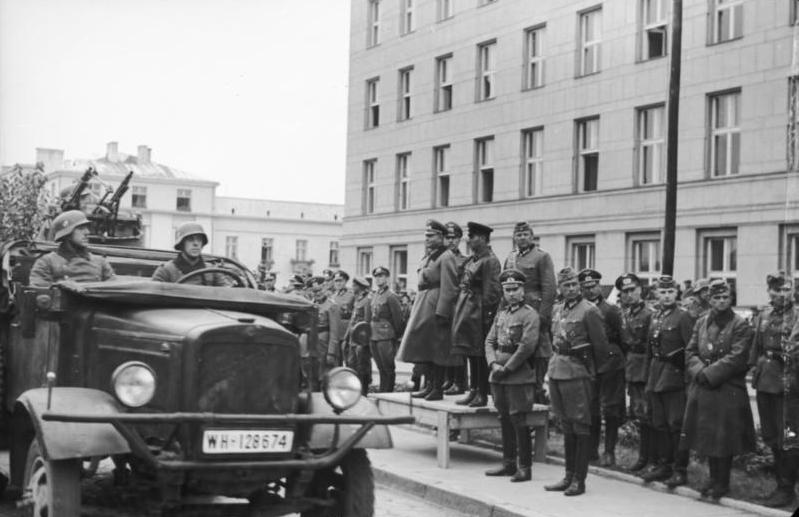
German and Soviet military forces parade in Brześć side by side after the attack on Poland in 1939. Their secret Molotov–Ribbentrop Pact required Heinz Guderian to hand the city over to the Red Army

After the signing of the Molotov–Ribbentrop Pact on 23 August 1939, Germany invaded Poland on 1 September 1939, and the Soviet Union invaded Poland on 17 September, resulting in the occupation of Poland by the Soviet Union and Nazi Germany. The first Gestapo–NKVD meeting took place in Brześć nad Bugiem (Brest) reportedly on 27 September 1939, while some units of the Polish Army were still fighting (see: Invasion of Poland) resulting in mass internment of soldiers and their extrajudicial shootings on both sides of the Curzon Line. At the meeting, the German and Soviet officials reached a mutual agreement about the fate of Polish infantry soldiers captured by the Red Army. On 28 September 1939, the German–Soviet Boundary and Friendship Treaty was signed with a Secret Supplementary Protocol #2 where parties agreed upon suppression of Polish resistance:

Both parties will tolerate in their territories no Polish agitation which affects the territories of the other party. They will suppress in their territories all beginnings of such agitation and inform each other concerning suitable measures for this purpose.

— Secret Supplementary Protocol (2), German-Soviet Boundary and Friendship Treaty 28 September 1939

Between 24 October and 23 November 1939, a total of 42,492 Polish prisoners of war were transferred from Kozelsk and Putyvl camps across the Nazi–Soviet demarcation line and handed over to the Germans. Both Gestapo and NKVD expected the emergence of Polish resistance and discussed ways of dealing with the clandestine activities of the Poles. In the immediate aftermath of the meeting, the Soviet NKVD began the collection of data leading to the Katyn massacre committed in the spring of 1940.

== Conferences ==
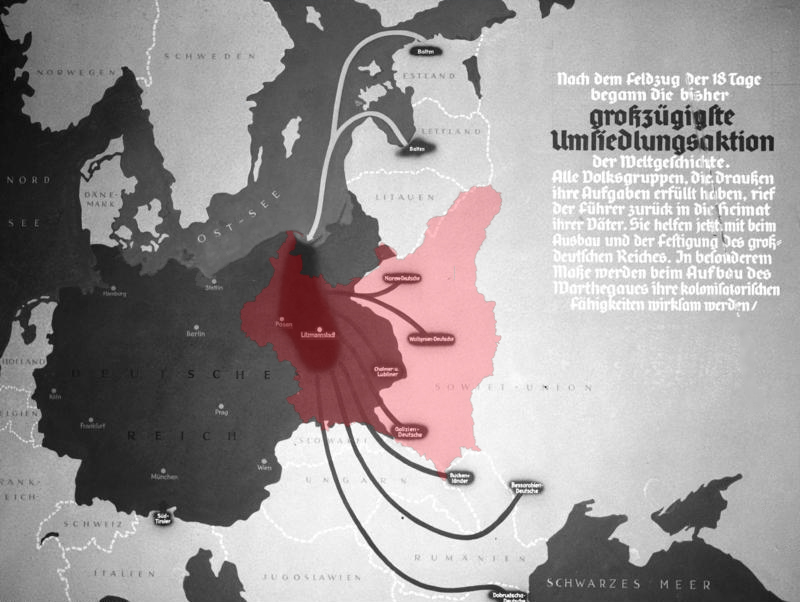
Dark gray: the Third Reich in 1939 after the conquest of Poland, with the German-Soviet demarcation line (centre), and locations of ethnic Germans brought Heim ins Reich from the Soviet "sphere of influence" to the annexed territories of Poland. Nazi propaganda poster, superimposed with red outline of Poland omitted in the original.

The next meeting took place some time at the end of November 1939 in Przemyśl, shared by the German and the Soviet occupational forces between September 1939 and June 1941. Apart from talks of fighting Polish resistance, the Soviets and the Germans discussed ways of exchanging Polish prisoners of war. Also, the first discussions about the occupation of Poland were started. Some historians claim this meeting took place in Lwów. It is also claimed a meeting was held in December.

=== Kraków–Zakopane ===
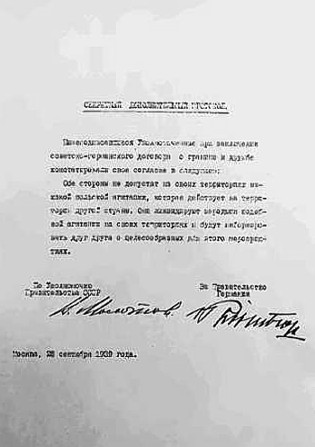
The German–Soviet Frontier Treaty reading: "Both parties will tolerate in their territories no Polish agitation which affects the territories of the other party. They will suppress in their territories all beginnings of such agitation and inform each other concerning suitable measures for this purpose."

The best known conference took place in Zakopane, in the villa "Pan Tadeusz", located at the Droga do Białego street close to the Dolina Białego valley. The German side was represented by Adolf Eichmann. The Soviet delegation was headed by Grigoriy Litvinov.

According to several sources, one of the results of this conference was the German Ausserordentliche Befriedungsaktion (see: German AB Action operation in Poland), elimination of Kraków intelligentsia Sonderaktion Krakau and the Soviet Katyn massacre In his 1991 book Stalin: Breaker of Nations, British historian Robert Conquest stated: "Terminal horror suffered by so many millions of innocent Jewish, Slavic, and other European peoples as a result of this meeting of evil minds is an indelible stain on the history and integrity of Western civilization, with all of its humanitarian pretensions". Also, Professor George Watson of Cambridge University concluded in his "Rehearsal for the Holocaust?" commentary (June 1981) that the fate of the interned Polish officers may have been decided at this conference. This is however disputed by other historians, who point out that there is no documentary evidence confirming any cooperation on that issue, that the existing Soviet documentation actually makes such cooperation improbable and that it is reasonable to say that Germany did not know about the Katyn massacre until the mass graves were analysed by the Katyn Commission.

The fourth and last meeting took place in March 1940 in Kraków. According to some historians, it was part of the Zakopane Conference. This event was described by General Tadeusz Bór-Komorowski, commander of Armia Krajowa in his book Armia Podziemna (The Secret Army). In it, he describes how a special delegation of NKVD came to Kraków, which was going to discuss with Gestapo how to act against the Polish resistance. The talks lasted for several weeks.

Russian historian Alexandr Nekrich describes formal military cooperation agreement signed on 20 September 1939 where both sides committed to "cleansing of hostile population" and "liquidation" of Polish resistance.

Historian Wojciech Materski points out that there is evidence of clandestine murder operations conducted by both Soviet and German forces in 1939–1940 across occupied Poland, however, there is no evidence of direct connection between the NKVD prisoner massacres and the German AB-Aktion in Poland leading to the massacre of several thousand prominent Poles in the same time-frame.

== See also ==
- Chronicles of Terror
- Intelligenzaktion
- Katyn massacre
- Nazi crimes against the Polish nation
- Polish areas annexed by Nazi Germany
- Polish Operation of the NKVD
- Soviet repressions of Polish citizens (1939–1946)
- Territories of Poland annexed by the Soviet Union
- Internment of refugees in the Soviet Union during World War II
