= Aktion AB =

1940 imprisonment and murder of civilians

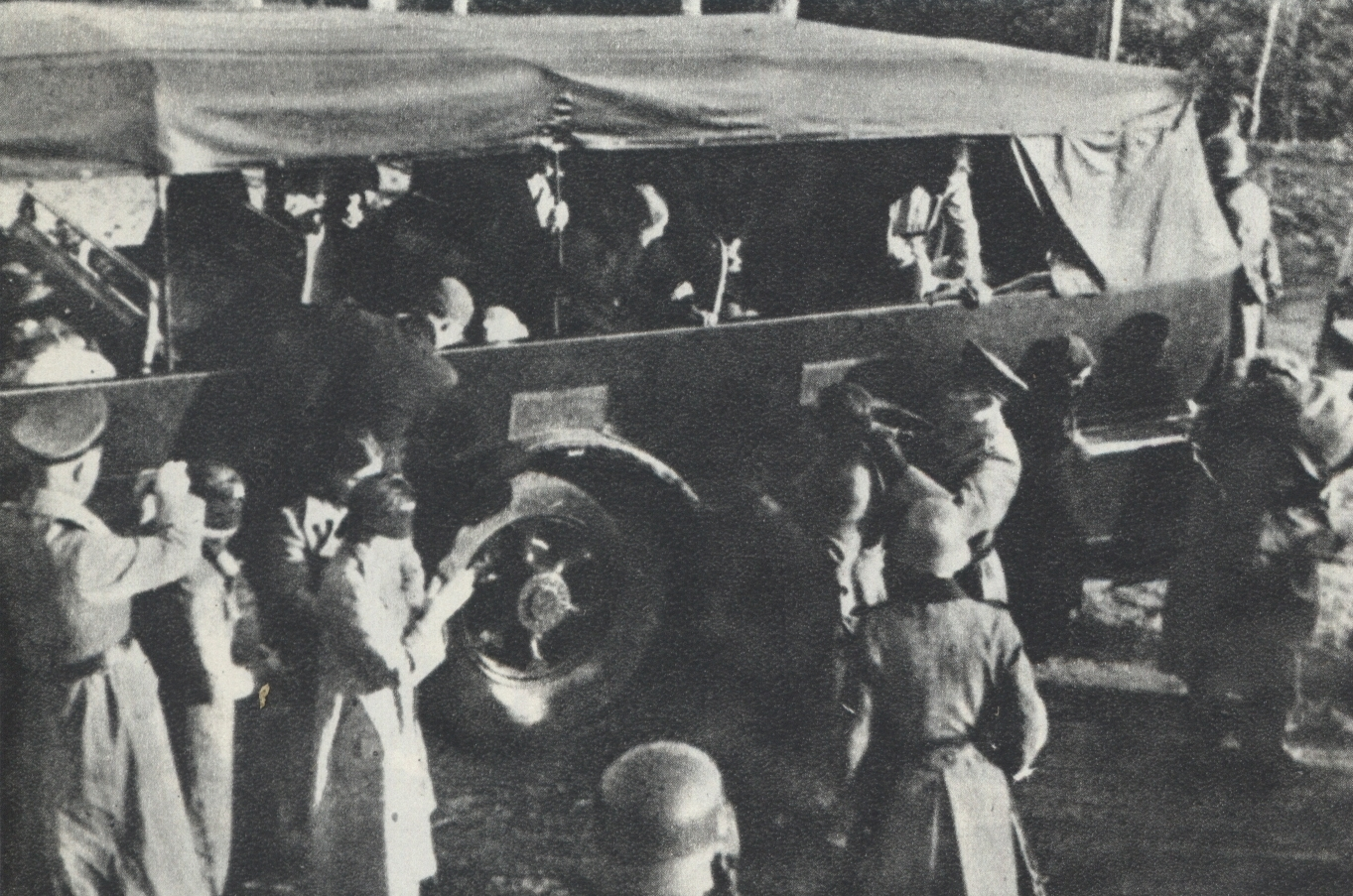
- Polish Underground photo of the Nazi secret police deboarding victims at the Palmiry forest execution site near Warsaw in 1940
- Also known as: German: Außerordentliche Befriedungsaktion
- Location: Palmiry Forest and similar locations in occupied Poland
- Date: March–July 1940
- Incident type: Mass murder with automatic weapons
- Perpetrators: Hans Frank, Bruno Streckenbach, Friedrich Wilhelm Krüger, and others
- Participants: Nazi Germany
- Organizations: Waffen-SS, SS, Order Police battalions, Sicherheitsdienst, SiPo
- Victims: 7,000 intellectuals and leaders of the Second Polish Republic
- Documentation: Pawiak and Gestapo
- Memorials: Murder sites and deportation points
- Notes: Lethal phase of the occupation of Poland

Aktion AB (short for German: Außerordentliche Befriedungsaktion lit. 'Extraordinary Pacification Operation', Polish: Akcja AB) was the second stage of Nazi Germany's campaign of violence in the occupied General Government (GG) of Poland. It followed the Intelligenzaktion, during Germany's invasion the preceding year, which sought to eliminate the intellectuals and the upper classes of the Second Polish Republic. The remaining Polish population would thus be docile and exploitable, making it easier to Germanise Poland and extirpate Polish cultural, ethnic and national identity. The November 1939 Sonderaktion Krakau was a template for Aktion AB. Most of the 150 faculty and staff at Jagiellonian University in Kraków who were arrested survived the concentration camps and were released within months. German leader Adolf Hitler had personally charged GG governor Hans Frank with keeping Poland stable during the invasion of France the following year. When security forces made their next wave of arrests, Frank concluded it would be better to execute those arrested shortly afterwards.

In spring 1940 several conferences were held, including some jointly with the Soviet NKVD, to formalize plans for AB. Shortly afterwards arrests began. Over 30,000 Polish citizens were taken into custody; about 7,000 were subsequently massacred. Despite Frank's initial intent to quickly execute all arrestees, at Reichsführer Heinrich Himmler's request many were sent to concentration camps, including the first to arrive at Auschwitz. The resistance soon recovered from the major setback. By late 1941, the Germans switched to tactics that more specifically targeted known or suspected underground groups, as more Poles from all walks of life began taking action against the occupiers, contrary to German expectations. Mass executions continued as a method of state terror.

== History ==
The 1918 Treaty of Versailles had recognized the creation of the Second Polish Republic out of the eastern territory of the former German Empire. Some leaders of the postwar German Weimar Republic had regarded that as intolerable, and sought to restore German hegemony to the east by destroying the new Polish state. Vladimir Lenin, leader of the newly-established Soviet Union to Poland's east, also saw an independent Poland as "very dangerous" but useful in securing a Soviet alliance with Germany. Despite having concluded a non-aggression agreement with Poland in 1934, Germany under Nazi leader Adolf Hitler continued to have issues with Poland, particularly around the Polish Corridor, which while guaranteeing Poland access to the Baltic Sea also separated Germany from its exclave East Prussia and the German-dominated Free City of Danzig (now Gdańsk), as well as the treatment of German citizens who remained resident in now-Polish territory. So, Germany invaded Poland on 1 September 1939, beginning World War II in Europe. By the end of the month, with some assistance from the Soviets, Poland had fallen.

After conquering Poland, the Nazis began drafting and implementing what they would eventually formalise as Generalplan Ost, their master plan for Germany's eastward expansion, entailing the colonisation and replacement of many of the (mostly Slavic) native populations of the countries it conquered with Germans and related peoples. "From now on, the swastika will fly over this country forever." announced Hans Frank, appointed governor of the General Government (GG), the German-occupied part of Poland that was not annexed by either Germany or the Soviet Union after the invasion. "The Polish state will never be reborn." (Note: Frank went on to say that the Poles should consider themselves fortunate Germany took this step, given how poorly having their own state had worked out for them in the past.) The initial goal was to begin Germanising the former Poland once the war, expected to be short, was over. In order to do so it was necessary to minimize any potential resistance. The Nazis saw the Polish intelligentsia, including not just the country's academics and artists, but its politicians, aristocrats, professionals, clergy, military officers, and generally everyone sufficiently educated or wealthy to have a position of authority, even informally, in Polish society, as a likely source of leadership. Nazi ideology held that only these people had a true national consciousness; the rest of the population was indifferent to the fate of the state and cared more about their daily lives. Once the intelligentsia had been eliminated, the Nazis believed the remaining Poles would be useful to them as unskilled labour.

=== Intelligenzaktion ===
The first mass murder of the intelligentsia, and any other people suspected of potential anti-Nazi activity, began in September 1939, after the German invasion of Poland, and continued until the next spring. It was conducted in part according to an "enemies of the Reich list" prepared before the war by the Gestapo members of the German minority in Poland and printed ahead of time by German intelligence as Sonderfahndungsbuch Polen (Special Prosecution Book-Poland). Nazi Germany regarded the operation as a pre-emptive measure to keep the Polish resistance scattered and prevent a possible uprising during the planned German invasion of France. Known as the Intelligenzaktion, this was a plan to eliminate Poland's intelligentsia and leadership in the western and central areas Germany annexed after the invasion. It was carried out by the Schutzstaffel's (SS) Einsatzgruppen units, with the assistance of the Volksdeutscher Selbstschutz, a militia raised from the ethnic Germans in Poland. As the result of this operation 100,000 Polish nobles, teachers, entrepreneurs, social workers, priests, judges and political activists were arrested in ten regional actions. Some were spared because they were needed for civil administration. Nearly 50,000 of those arrested were executed, while the remainder were sent to concentration camps, where few survived.

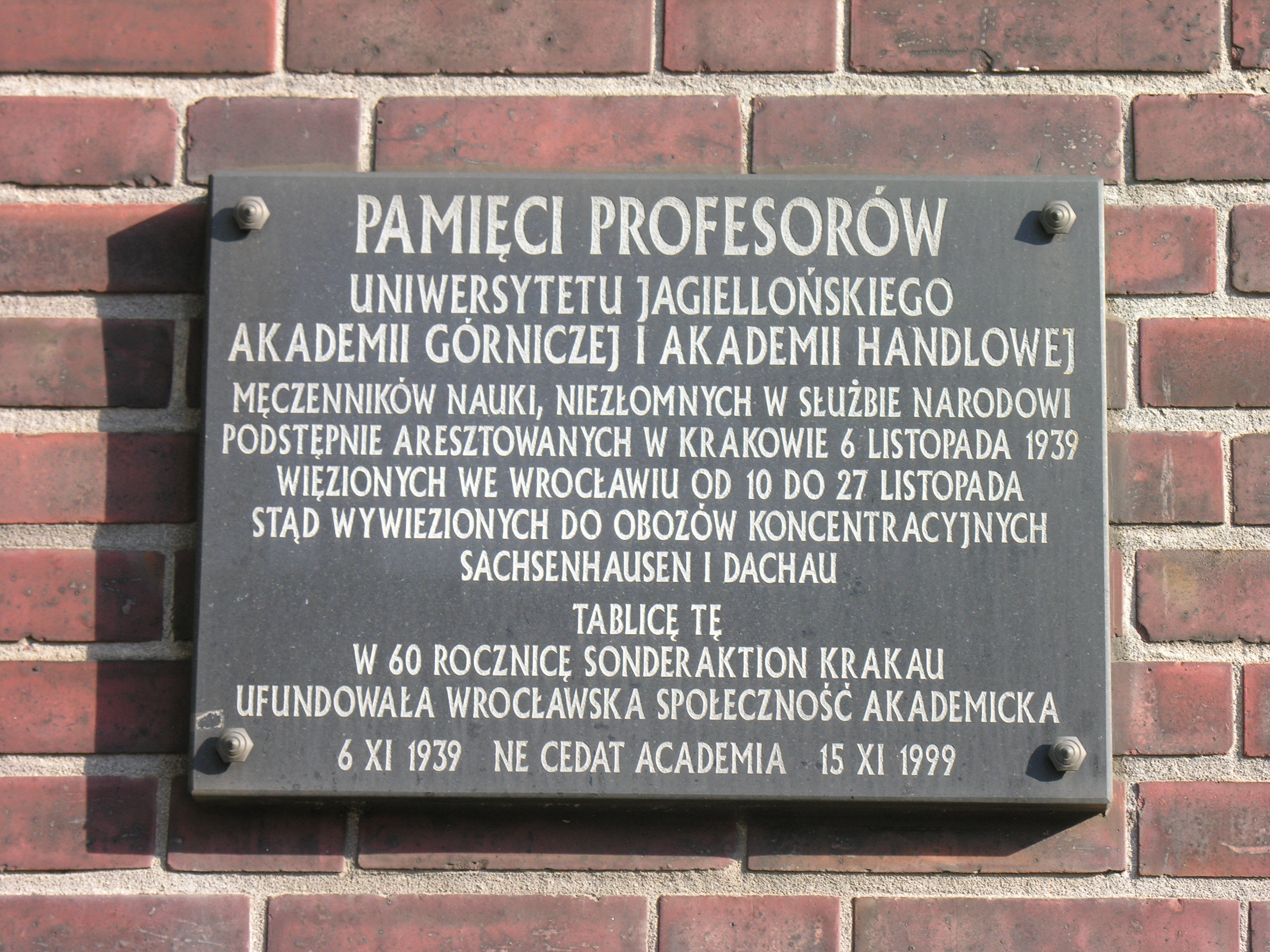
Memorial plaque to arrested faculty at Jagiellonian

The Intelligenzaktion was extended to the GG, where it spared most of the Catholic clergy and larger landowners. Among the actions carried out there was Sonderaktion Krakau in November 1939, in which the president and the entire faculty of Jagiellonian University in Kraków were arrested and sent to concentration camps. Their arrest drew condemnation from Fascist Italy and the Vatican. Those who survived imprisonment were eventually released, although some died shortly afterwards as a result of maltreatment and undernourishment in the camps.

The Polish resistance had been organizing since the previous year's military defeat. By the end of 1939 there were 140 separate organizations that had begun underground operations of some kind, from printing newspapers to promoting light sabotage such as painting the logo of the Polish Underground State and anti-German slogans on walls. In February 1940 the Political Consultative Committee was formed to unite all the resistance organizations politically. In March and April Henryk Dobrzański, an army major who had taken command of soldiers who had refused to surrender and evaded German capture over the winter, led ambushes against superior German forces near Radom until he himself was killed in an ambush. Nazi German authorities decided the time was ideal for another anti-intellectual purge, this time within the GG, while international attention was focused on France.

== Aktion AB ==
=== German preparations and planning ===
The AB-Aktion had its origins in discussions with Soviet officials during a series of secret Gestapo–NKVD conferences that began at the end of September 1939 after Germany and the Soviet Union had partitioned Poland. A secret protocol to the German–Soviet Boundary and Friendship Treaty signed at that time bound both parties to "tolerate in their territories no Polish agitation which affects the territories of the other party [and] suppress in their territories all beginnings of such agitation." By the conclusion of the talks in March 1940, the two secret police agencies had begun primarily discussing how to suppress Polish resistance.

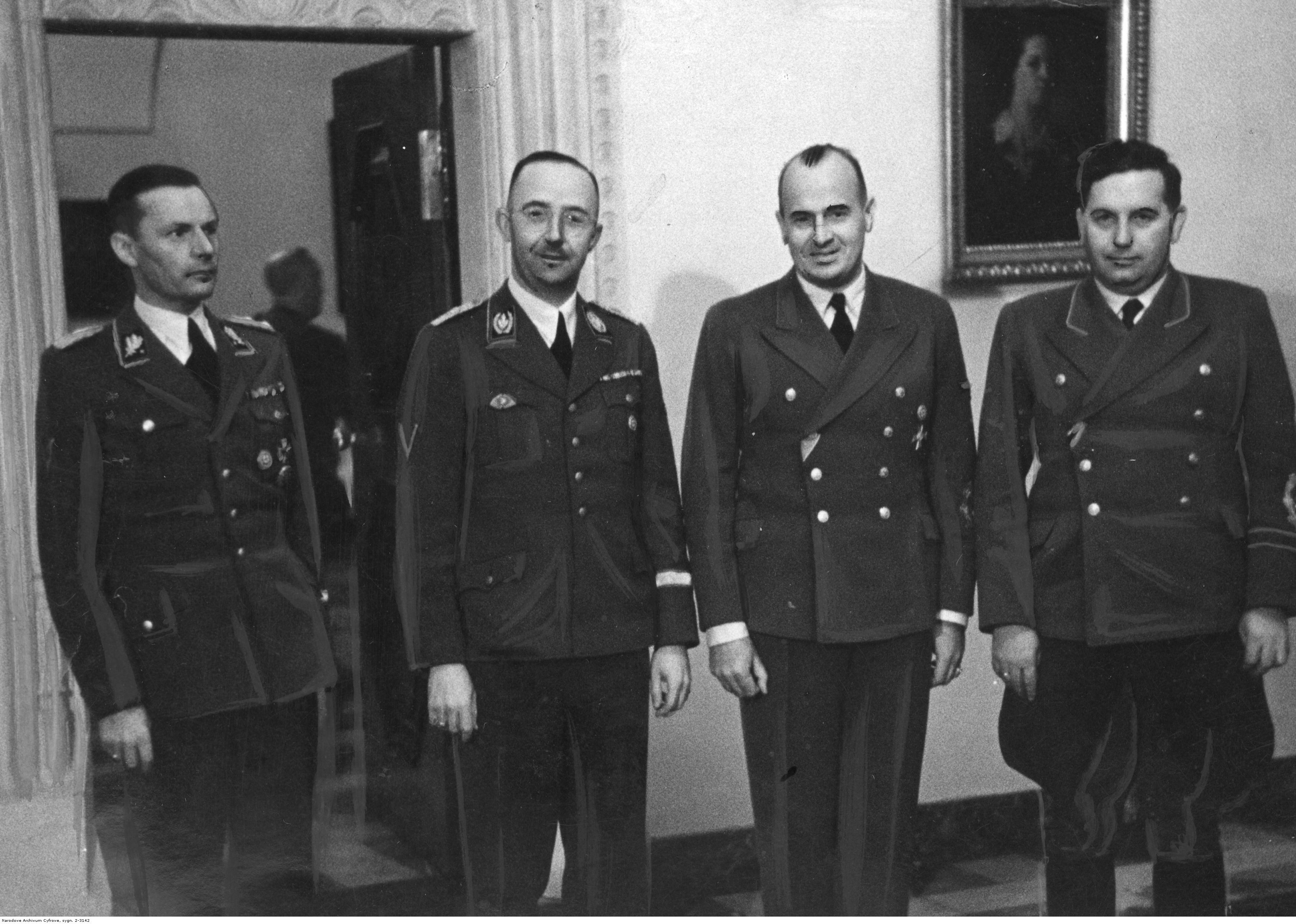
Several high-level Nazis involved in Aktion AB: from left, Friedrich Wilhelm Krüger, Himmler, Hans Frank, and Josef Bühler, photographed in 1942

Hitler had personally charged GG governor-general Hans Frank with keeping Poland under control to avoid any distractions during the forthcoming offensive in the West. On March 2, 1940, Frank convened a meeting with the military and security leaders, together with the four GG district governors, to announce Aktion AB, short for Außerordentliche Befriedungsaktion, or "Extraordinary Pacification Action". Noting that resistance organisations had already arisen, he warned that "we may wake up one morning and find ourselves overwhelmed by them if we do not soon launch a large-scale attack against at least their leaders." At a meeting six days later, he revealed that the initiative had been ordered personally by Hitler. "The slightest attempt by the Poles to take action will result in a massive liquidation action against them", he warned. "I would not hesitate to use any method of terror and I would not shrink from any consequences."

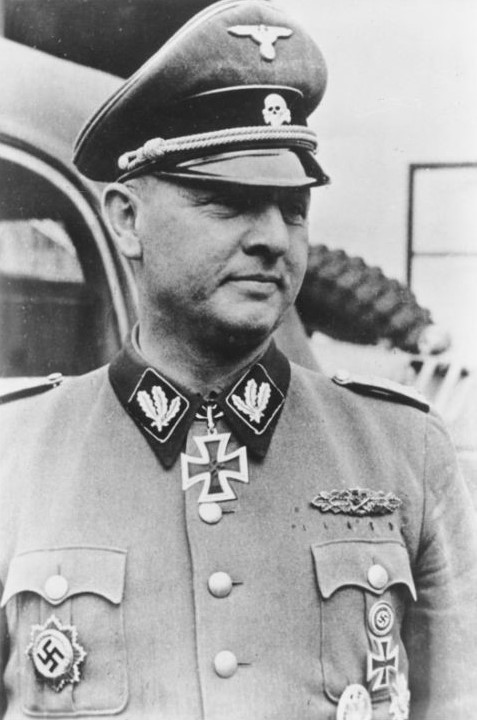
Bruno Streckenbach

Immediately after the second meeting, SS Brigadeführer Bruno Streckenbach, commander of the Sicherheitsdienst (SD) and Sicherheitspolizei (SiPo) in the GG, ordered his officers to begin arresting members of resistance organizations. He also suspended the releases of Poles who remained imprisoned after the 1939 actions. By the end of April, he reported that 1,000 of 2,200 to 2,400 suspected resistance members were in custody.

At a meeting in Kraków on 16 May with Streckenbach and GG administrative officials, Frank again stressed the danger posed by Polish resistance. Citing the ongoing partisan actions of the Detached Unit of the Polish Army and other recent incidents of attacks and acts of sabotage against Germans and the occupying forces, those present agreed to launch a plan to ensure that "the Polish resistance movement will be deprived of its leaders, the authority of the Führer and the Reich in the General Government will increase enormously, and peace in the country will be unconditionally maintained." All measures were to be centrally coordinated and authorised in order to emphasize German authority over the GG. Frank ordered Streckenbach to commence Aktion AB without delay and granted him special legal powers for its implementation. The operations were intended to be completed within a month, after which cases were to be heard before Standgerichte, special temporary police courts. The list of targets came in part from the Sonderfahndungsbuch Polen used during the Intelligenzaktion.

Two weeks later, after the operation had started, another meeting was held to discuss the progress and further elucidate its goals and methods. Frank made it clear to all concerned that Aktion AB was specifically aimed at preventing the Poles from taking advantage of the invasion of France and the Low Countries to mount an uprising. For the first time he used the word "liquidation" to describe the goal of the operation, estimating that it would cost the lives of at least several thousand Poles. Streckenbach reported that half of "the flower of Polish intelligentsia and resistance" had been arrested; he estimated that 75% of the total would be in German hands by the conclusion of Aktion AB. Most of the arrested would simply be shot shortly afterwards rather than sent to camps, it was decided. This, for Frank, was a lesson learned from the arrests of the Jagiellonian professors, which led to unnecessary "hassle" and would have turned out differently had the Germans just killed them. He also ordered any Polish prisoners still held in camps in the Reich to be returned to the GG to avoid overburdening those camps.

Aktion AB was envisioned not as the final action necessary to suppress the resistance but as merely the second of several. Through AB the Germans sought to intimidate the whole population by eliminating potential resistance leaders. To that end, they arrested 3,000 known criminals in order to discredit the intellectuals they were murdered alongside. Ernst Zörner, governor of the Lublin District, requested that workers and peasants be dropped from the lists for economic reasons, suggesting that originally the scope of Aktion AB had been broader.

== Operation ==
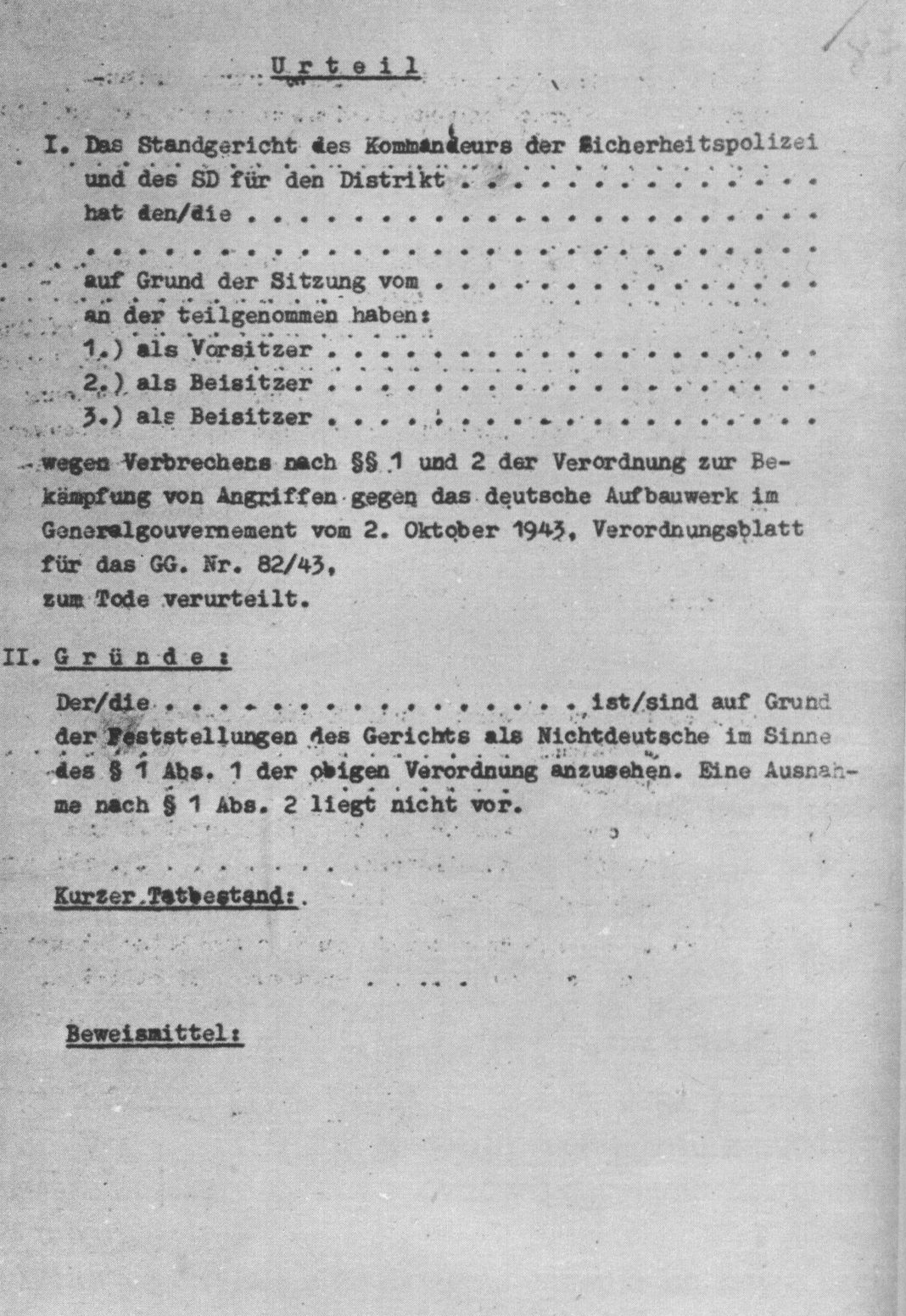
Blank Standgericht death sentence form

A catalyst for the liquidation of most prisoners was Frank's desire to avoid sending GG arrestees to camps in the Reich. But on a visit to Warsaw at the end of April, as planning for Aktion AB was getting underway, Reichsführer Heinrich Himmler had ordered that 20,000 Poles be sent west. Accordingly, trains with up to a thousand prisoners at a time deposited Polish prisoners at camps in the Reich. One-third of the total, per Himmler's order, were taken to Sachsenhausen. In June 1940, one group of 728 Poles held in Tarnów became the first large group taken to Auschwitz. For many, the camps were a place to be held until a sufficient number had arrived to be shot, as happened to many prisoners taken from Warsaw to Mauthausen in the autumn of 1940. Stanisław Grzesiuk reports that Gestapo officers from Warsaw were believed to be on hand to personally choose those to be shot.

The majority of those arrested were, however, not transported to camps but shot en masse at selected sites in remote forests within the GG after being questioned about any involvement in or awareness of resistance activity. The Standgerichten were used to provide a veneer of due process to the executions in some cases, usually condemning the accused on thin grounds. On the orders of Friedrich-Wilhelm Krüger, the GG's SS commander, units carrying out the executions were provided with "spiritually valuable" entertainment after completing their duties.

=== Warsaw District ===
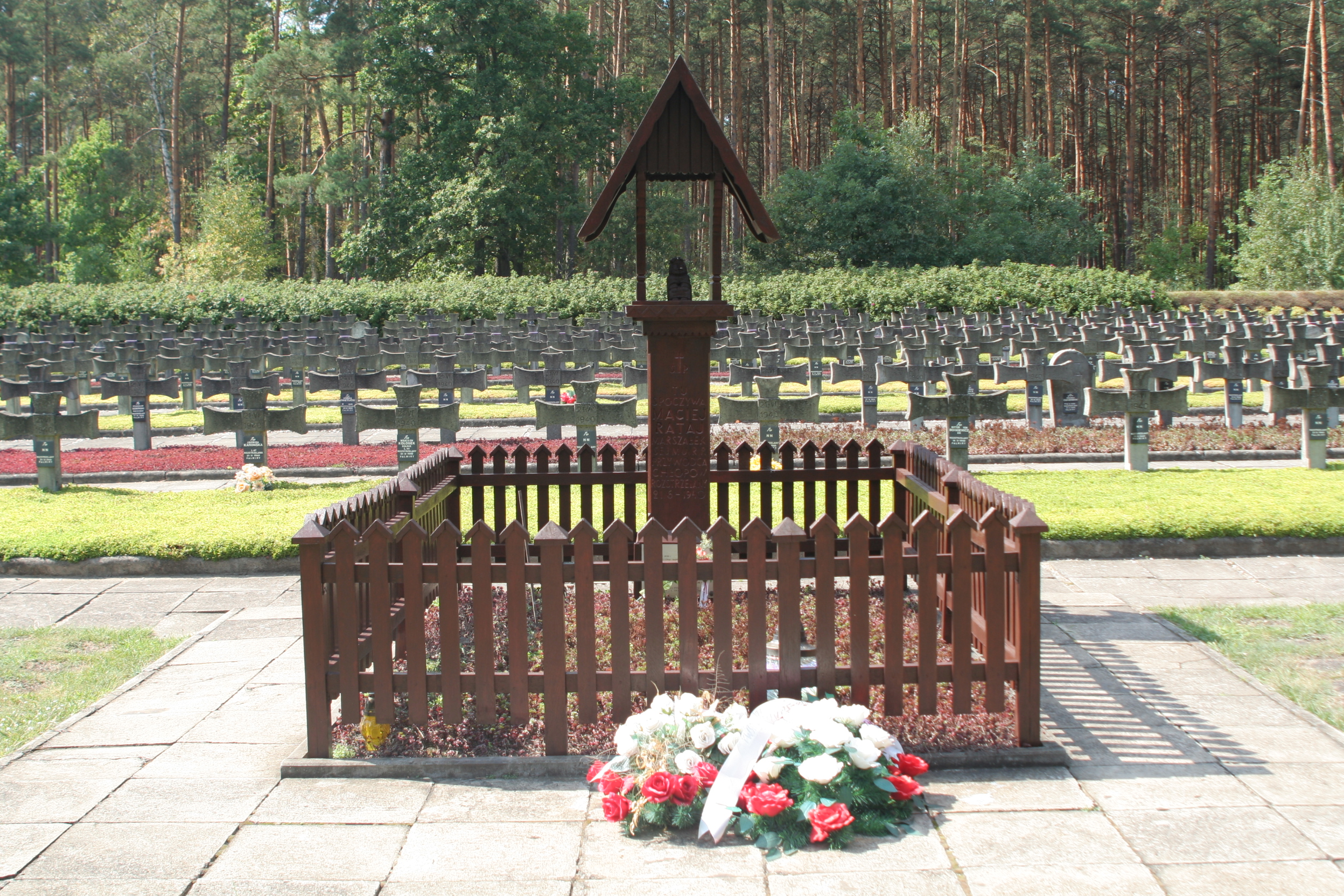
Grave of Maciej Rataj in Palmiry

Many of those taken by Aktion AB came from Warsaw, not only Poland's capital but its social and cultural centre. The arrests began at the end of March, targeting politicians, activists, teachers and professionals, all categories that in the opinion of the city's SS commander, Josef Albert Meisinger, could play a significant role in inciting and leading resistance to German rule. Among them were Maciej Rataj, former speaker of parliament and deputy president of the Polish Second Republic, and Jan Pohoski, vice president of Warsaw before the war. Arrests came in waves, and quickly. On April 20, 42 lawyers were arrested during a raid on the headquarters of the city's bar association. Three weeks later several primary school principals were arrested as a result of having dismissed students from school on Constitution Day, long a Polish national holiday, a week earlier. University professors were largely spared as Meisinger did not consider them, as a group, a significant threat.

Most of those arrested in the Warsaw District were held at Warsaw's Pawiak prison. Except for one group of 1,500 transported to Sachsenhausen at the beginning of May, most were, as Frank had directed, murdered. An open area of Kampinos Forest northwest of Warsaw, near the village of Palmiry, used for executions since late December, became the site of hundreds of shootings of those arrested in AB, beginning with approximately 20 people in mid-June. A week later a series of three transports took 358 detainees from Pawiak there. Among the notable Poles killed were Rataj, Stefan Bryła, builder of the Maurzyce Bridge; Tadeusz Tański, designer of the CWS T-1 automobile; socialist Mieczysław Niedziałkowski, Olympic champion runner Janusz Kusociński and biologist Stefan Kopec. Sitno and Żelechów, in the countryside, were also the sites of mass executions.

=== Kraków District ===
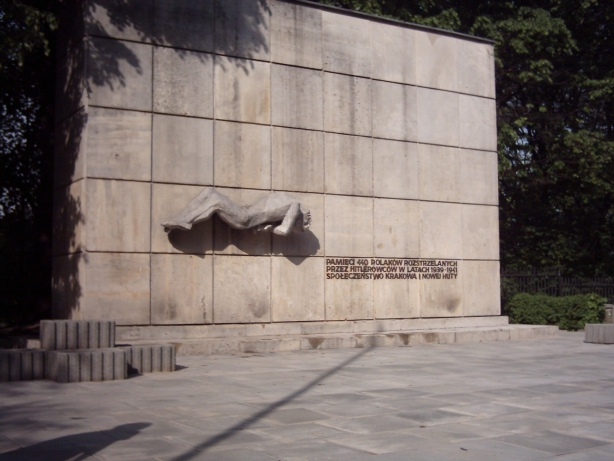
Memorial to victims at Fort Krzesławice

Arrests in the city of Kraków began at the end of March 1940 with a wave of a thousand taken into custody. On May 3, Constitution Day, German police arrested many of those on their lists as they were leaving church services. Others were arrested individually. Most were held at the Montelupich Prison, where a Standgerichten presided over by Ludwig Hahn heard cases on the ground floor. In May, 290 of those arrested were convicted of treason. While, as happened in Warsaw, some were taken to nearby forests at Przegorzały and Nowy Wiśnicz to be shot, at least 150 executions were carried out at Fort 49 in Wzgórza Krzesławickie in the city's northwest, continuing the site's use for that purpose since the preceding October.

Outside Kraków, arrests did not begin in earnest until after the second May meeting where Frank had expressed his preference for executions over transport to camps. Those arrested were often concentrated in large prisons at Sanok or Tarnów until their fate was decided. To the categories of intellectuals targeted by Aktion AB elsewhere in the GG were added all those who had been captured while trying to escape across the border into the Slovak Republic and Hungary. By April 1940 Sanok, near the border, held 619, and the Germans took advantage of AB to reduce its population. In early July 112 of those prisoners were shot on Gruszka Hill near Tarnawa Dolna, with an additional 93 killed in the woods near Sieklówka. All the deaths were officially listed as suicides. Most of those victims were officers and soldiers who had been trying to make their way to France and join Polish units there.

Rzeszów Castle was another center for holding those imprisoned by Aktion AB until they were massacred or transported. In late June a group of 83–104 prisoners, including 42 from youth resistance groups, was taken to the woods outside Lubzina and shot, a death toll complemented the following day when 93 Nowy Sącz prisoners were massacred in the woods near Trzetrzewina. Other small country towns in the region were also used as execution sites.

Those the Germans spared were often sent to Auschwitz. A 20 June transport from Nowy Wiśnicz brought 313 people there, with 65 Montelupich prisoners joining them the following month. Other destination camps were Sachsenhausen, where a group of 500 from Tarnów was taken early in August, and Ravensbrück, which received 126 women.

=== Lublin District ===
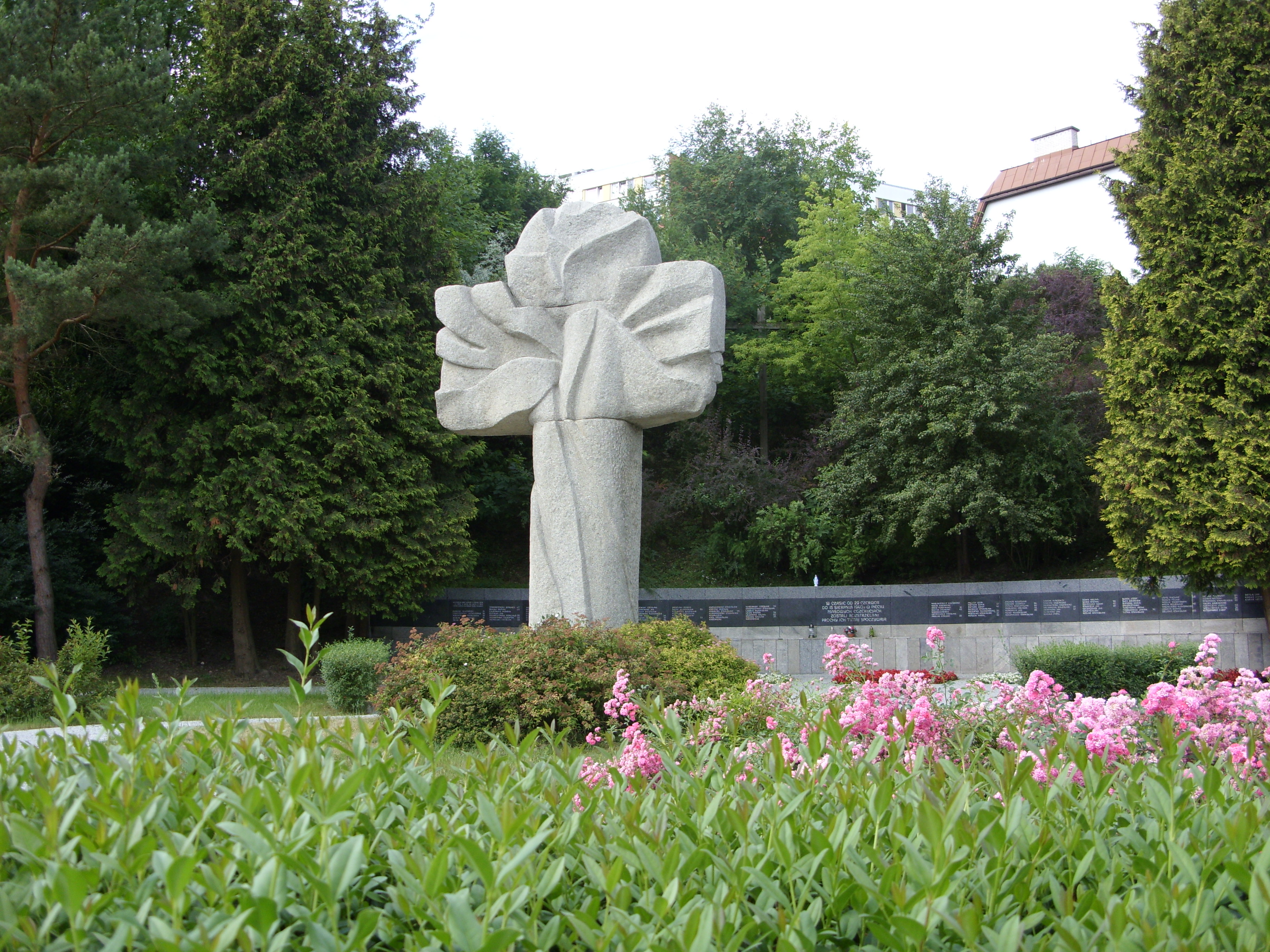
Memorial at the site of the executions in Rury Jezuickie

Aktion AB in the Lublin area did not start until June. Authorities there preferred mass arrests to operations against individuals. These started early in the month in Chełm, Puławy, Janów Lubelski, Radzyń Podlaski and other small towns. On 24 June, in the city of Lublin, 814 Poles aged 18 to 60 were arrested in one day and held at Lublin Castle; that day 40 teachers attending what they had been told was a conference in Biała Podlaska were also taken into custody. Arrests over the next two days in Zamość brought in 200, and on 26 June another 500 were arrested in Lubartów.

Those arrested in outlying areas were usually brought to Lublin Castle after a short stay in local prisons and jails such as the Zamość Rotunda. From Lublin, many were sent to camps, a thousand to Sachsenhausen with another 65 sent to Auschwitz in October. The rest, about 450–500, were executed at Rury Jezuickie, a short distance outside Lublin, in five large groups from the end of June through August, with some having been formally sentenced to death by the Standgerichten. Alternatively, a shooting range near Czechów Górny was used; other killings in the area took place at Niemce and Konopnica. Outside Chełm, 115 Poles arrested in the area were shot over 3–4 July in the woods near Kumowa Dolina.

=== Radom District ===
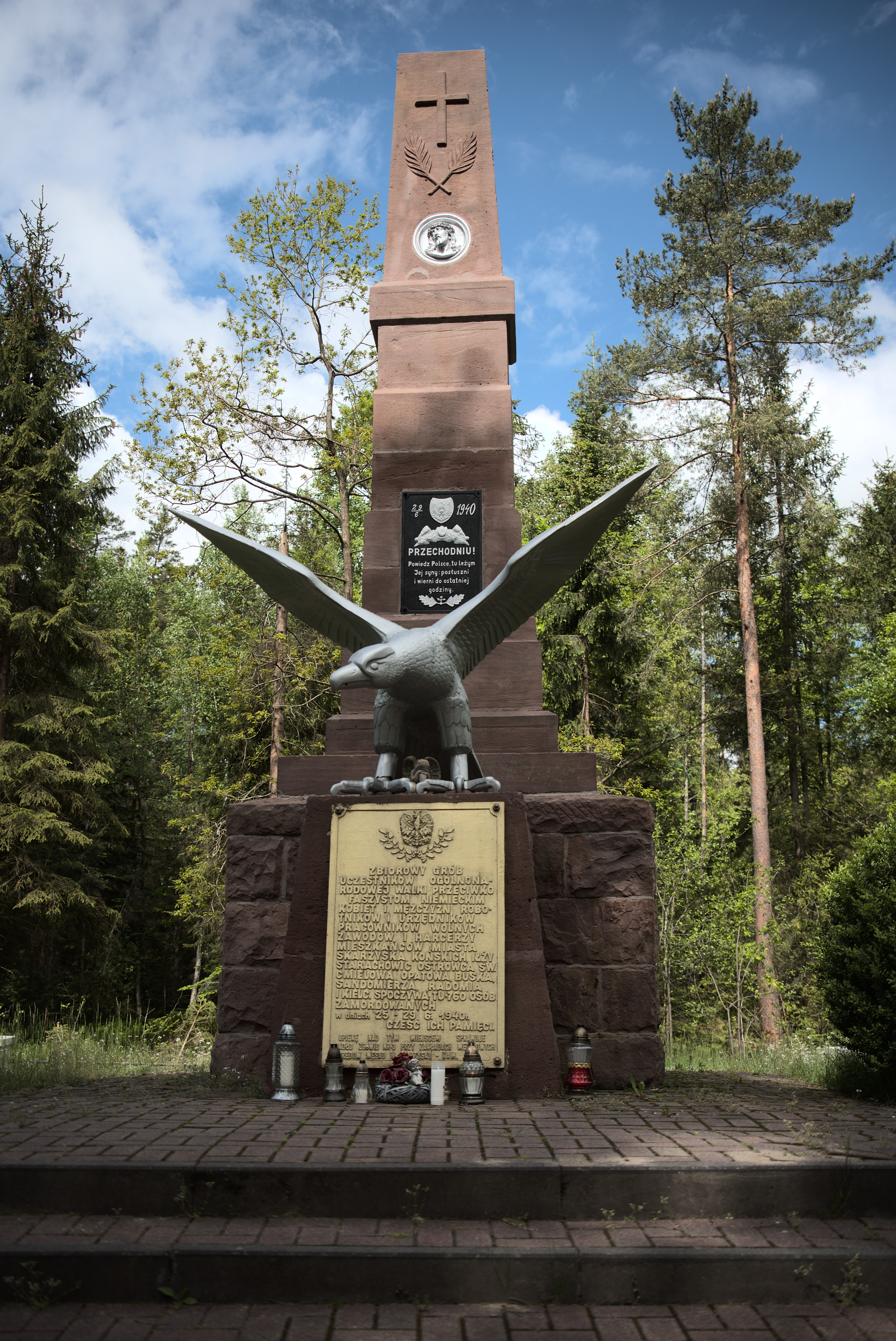
Monument to victims executed in Brzask Forest

Aktion AB is considered to have begun in the GG's Radom District with 42 arrests of "leadership class" intelligentsia in Częstochowa and another hundred in Radomsko and Piotrków Trybunalski. Two months later, additional raids were carried out in most towns within the district, with another 63 coming in Częstochowa, 53 (mostly school principals and teachers) in Radomsko and 120 in Piotrków Trybunalski on 12 June. The largest raid, with Volksdeutsche, local militia raised from ethnically German Poles, brought in 280 poles in Tomaszów Mazowiecki, with another hundred taken prisoner in Sulejów. Later raids in the Skarżysko-Kamienna area led to another hundred arrests. The last wave took place in early August, primarily in the western area of the district, with 130 arrested in Piotrków Trybunalski and another 150 from Częstochowa and Radomsko.

Most of the Radom District arrestees were sent to camps. A thousand from the early raids were taken to Sachsenhausen; in June a much smaller group was distributed among Auschwitz, Gross-Rosen and Dachau. Later prisoners were sent to Auschwitz, and in mid-August the last group was divided. Men were sent to Buchenwald and the women to Ravensbrück.

The Standgerichten sentenced some prisoners to death. Mass executions began in mid-June, with 63 prisoners shot at the forest stadium in Kielce, with others killed there over the next month. Around the same time, 117 Poles, mostly from Sandomierz, were shot in the woods near Góry Wysokie. On 29 June, one of the largest mass executions in the district took place in the Brzask Forest near Skarżysko-Kamienna: 760 prisoners were killed there, together with 19 residents of Królewiec who had been detained during a raid on the Detached Unit. At the same time, 42 more people were executed at an abandoned gunpowder magazine in the Wolborski Forest, north of Piotrków Trybunalski.

In the city of Radom itself, approximately 258 Poles were executed in a series of seven mass executions in the Firlej district from May to July. (Note: Older accounts put this total lower, around 228.) A total of 87 were shot in the woods near Olsztyn and Apolonka (Note: Based on a local court's investigation immediately after the war, historian Maria Wardzyńska has reported 400 victims at Olsztyn and an additional 60 at Apolonka. More detailed later research has not verified these numbers.) in three mass executions. Five were shot in the yard at Częstochowa prison.

== Conclusion ==
Several dates are given for the end of Aktion AB. The original plans called for all operations to be over by 15 June, and this date is considered the end by some historians. But some of the records suggest otherwise. Streckenbach did not report that AB was over for almost another month; Frank announced at a 23 July conference that it was finished. Transports to the camps and executions continued past that date, into the later months of 1940. From August to February, about 4,770 people were sent to camps from Warsaw area prisons. Historian Krzysztof Dunin-Wąsowicz thus considers Aktion AB to have symbolically ended on 17 January 1941, the day Streckenbach was dismissed from the GG.

The active persecution of Polish intellectuals continued for the rest of the war. The direct continuation of Aktion AB was a German campaign in the east started after the German invasion of the USSR. Among the most notable mass executions of Polish professors was the massacre of Lwów professors (in what is now Ukraine) during which approximately 45 people were murdered, including relatives and guests. Those killed included Tadeusz Boy-Żeleński, former Polish prime minister Kazimierz Bartel, Włodzimierz Stożek, and Stanisław Ruziewicz. Thousands more perished in the Ponary massacre, in German concentration camps, particularly Auschwitz, Gusen, and Stutthof, all originally designed for Polish intellectuals.

== Victims ==
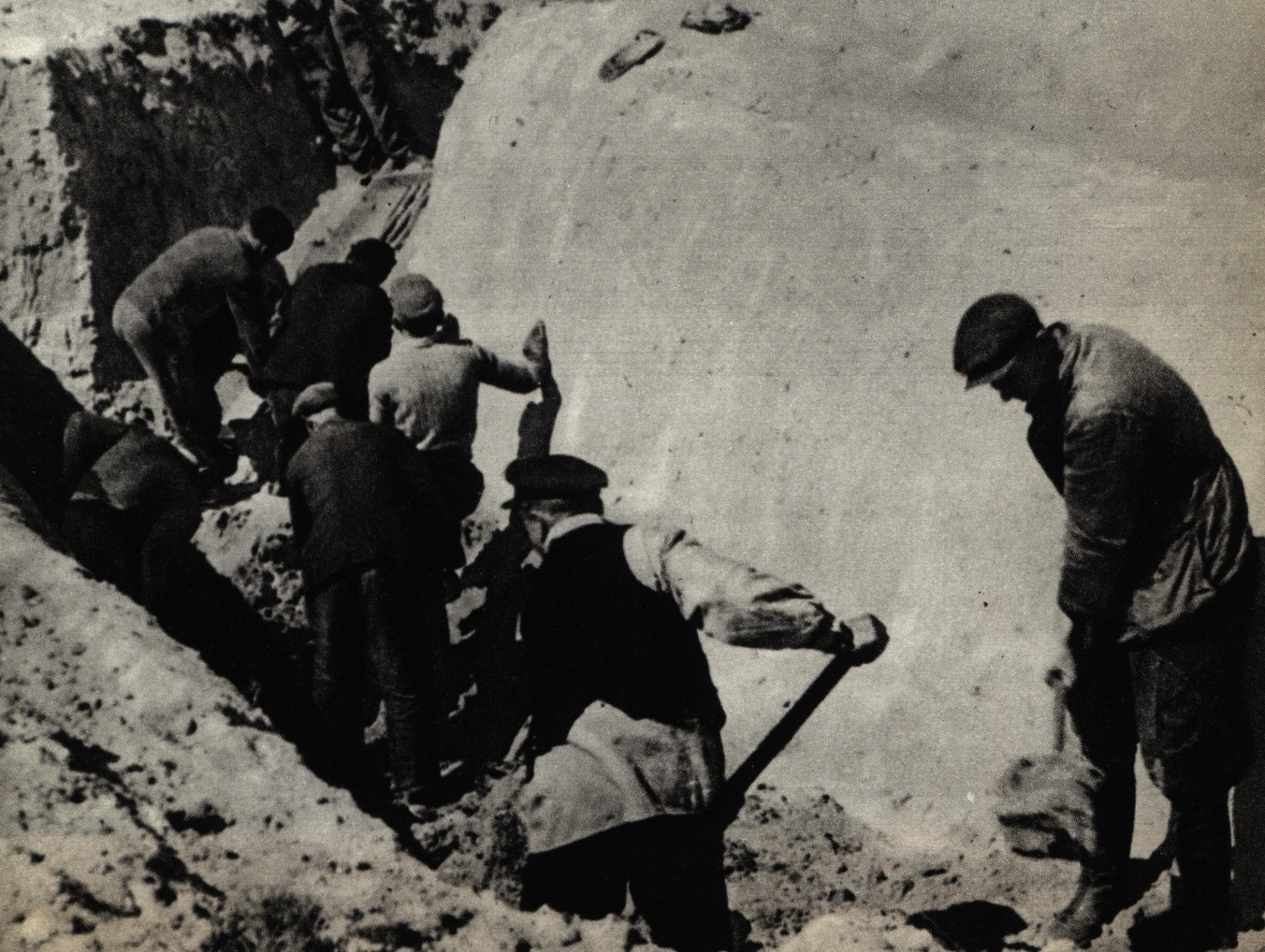
Exhumation of bodies at Palmiry after the war

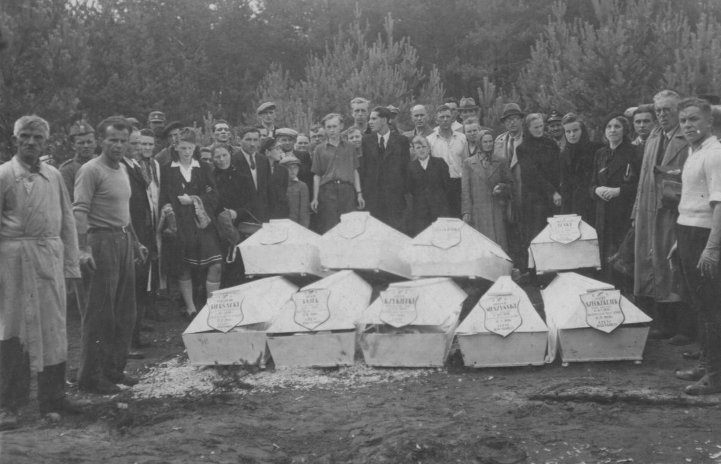
Exhumed bodies at Apolonka

Aktion AB is considered to have been fundamentally genocidal. There is no single comprehensive history of Aktion AB, and historians have not yet been able offer a full accounting of it. Most significant among the unknown facts is the exact count of victims. Czesław Łuczak, Czesław Madajczyk, and other Polish scholars have generally accepted Streckenbach's figure of 6,500—approximately 3,500 intelligentsia killed, along with 3,000 criminals. However, his accounting has never been verified, so that number is not considered authoritative. Records pertaining to the execution of the criminals are particularly fragmented and incomplete; it cannot be determined from them how many of those 3,000 actually were criminals. The deportation of many of those spared execution to concentration camps that few survived further complicates reaching an accurate count of the victims.

== Effect on resistance ==
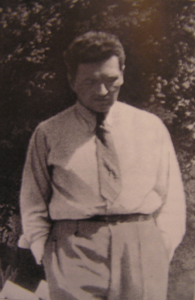
Rowecki in 1940

At first, as the Nazis had hoped, the rapid killing of so many members of the Polish elite had a damaging effect on the resistance, as many of its leaders and members were among those executed or deported. The Gestapo supplemented Aktion AB with several raids on small units of the Union of Armed Struggle (ZWZ). These operations further disrupted the remaining resistance organisations, which had already been demoralised by the fall of France in June. The Shoah Resource Center at Yad Vashem in Israel estimates that their numbers were reduced by a third. In November ZWZ general Stefan Rowecki wrote to the Polish government-in-exile in London that both working conditions and security for the resistance had become much worse since May. More specifically, he noted that the Germans had arrested several high-ranking resistance officers in Kraków, Rzeszów, Przemyśl, and Dębica in addition to eliminating several connections over the Slovak border, forcing the ZWZ to take even greater precautions.

In the longer term, however, Aktion AB had no effect on the growth of the resistance. Despite the setbacks he admitted, Growecki's reports to London also document continued activity. The ZWZ called on Poles to remain calm and focused, blunting German hopes of intimidating society. "Despite irreparable severe losses to Polish society, it stands taller", Growecki wrote in a January 1941 report. "More and more people are convinced that the losses to terror are war losses in the fight for survival and victory. Despite the terror, people continue to conceive plans for civil war and sabotage."

The German occupying authorities, too, came to doubt the long-term efficacy of Aktion AB. Officers in the security services believed that such ad hoc actions yielded minimal results that, ultimately, did not impede the growth of the resistance. (Note: German historian Hans von Krannhals later concluded that, paradoxically, Aktion AB made it harder for the security forces to suppress the resistance, because the fragmented and scattered cells left behind were much harder to gather intelligence on.) Streckenbach conceded at a GG meeting a year after the operation that the belief that resistance came exclusively from those who had been officers, officials, activists or highly educated had been "mistaken and very dangerous". While that did account for a core group of the resistance leadership, he conceded, it had been largely "peasants and workers" carrying out its actions. As a result the Germans decided, after concluding Aktion AB, to forsake similar mass actions, at least for a while, and concentrate instead on targeting specific Polish resistance cells.

== Fate of perpetrators ==
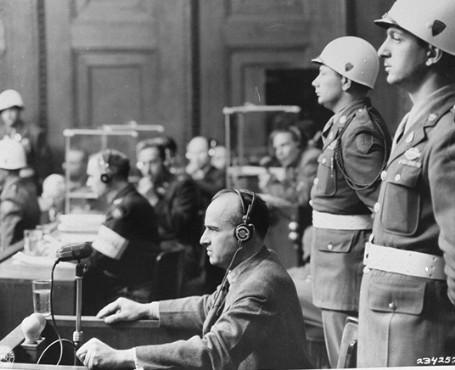
Frank during his trial at Nuremberg

Exactly how many people, and who among the German occupying authorities, were responsible for Aktion AB has never been conclusively established. Frank, as governor-general, bears most of the responsibility along with Krüger and Streckenbach, the senior SS officials in the GG. The four district governors—Ludwig Fischer (Warsaw), Otto Wächter (Kraków), Ernst Zörner (Lublin) and Karl Lasch (Frank's brother-in-law) (Radom)—also were intimately involved in planning the operation, along with the district SS and police commanders like Odilo Globocnik and Fritz Katzmann. Those plans were then implemented by the SD and SP in the districts, led by Meisinger and Ludwig Hahn, among others. Many lower-level members of those organizations also took part; those who sat on the Standgerichten bear special responsibility since they handed down formal death sentences when those were desired. (Note: Their standards of guilt, and thus for executions, were also very low. After Częstochowa vice-president Stanisław Nowak denied any knowledge of the resistance organizations the Germans suspected him of having, the Standgericht hearing his case recommended executing him anyway since, having served for over 35 years in local public office, he "exemplified the Polish way of thinking" and was thus too dangerous to be allowed to live.)

A few of the perpetrators were tried for crimes against humanity, including Aktion AB, (Note: German researcher Dieter Schenk argues that all the Nazi mass murders of Polish intelligentsia, whether by execution or extermination through labour in the camps, constitute an act of genocide by themselves under international law.) after the war. Frank and his deputy, Arthur Seyss-Inquart, were convicted at Nuremberg and hanged. Fischer, Meisinger and Josef Bühler, State Secretary of the GG, were tried in Poland under the Moscow Declarations as that was where they had committed their crimes. They were convicted by the Supreme National Tribunal (NTN) and hanged as well.

Hahn, the presiding judge of the Stulpenich Standgerichten, initially remained free in postwar Germany, living under his own name in Hamburg when he was arrested in 1960. Two attempts to bring him to trial failed due to insufficient evidence to support the charges; in 1972 he was finally tried, but convicted only on charges related to the execution of Polish political prisoners at Pawiak in 1944 and sentenced to eight years. In 1975 he was convicted of other charges relating to the deportation of Warsaw Jews to Treblinka and sentenced to life. Hahn was released in 1983 for health reasons and died three years later.

Before the war was over, Lasch faced German criminal charges. He was appointed governor of the newly created District of Galicia in August 1941, an area attached to the GG that had been part of the Ukrainian SSR before the war. A pawn in a power struggle between Frank and Himmler, he was relieved of that position and jailed in Kraków at the beginning of 1942 on embezzlement charges. Before Lasch could be tried, he was shot at the prison in Wrocław at Himmler's order. Whether this was by his own hand or a firing squad, and when, remains unclear.

Some other perpetrators of AB took their own lives as the war ended. Krüger, having survived a 1943 assassination attempt in Kraków, went on to command Waffen-SS units in Yugoslavia, Finland, and finally Austria, where he killed himself in May 1945 as Germany surrendered. Globočnik was also in Austria at that time and was captured by British troops along with other Nazis. He took a cyanide capsule and died before he could be questioned. Liphardt also took his own life in a Szczecin prison shortly after being returned to Poland. Zörner, removed as Lublin's district governor in 1943 and recalled to the Reich, is last known to have been serving with an army unit near Prague. He may have lived under an assumed name after that; his daughter's 1960 request to have him declared legally dead as of 21 December 1945 was granted.

A few avoided trial entirely. Streckenbach, after declining a senior SS post in Austria in 1943, served in the Waffen-SS at his request until being taken prisoner by the Red Army, along with other survivors of Army Group Courland, in Latvia shortly after the end of the war. After his release in 1955, he returned to Hamburg and worked as a clerk. Charges against him for his activities as the city's Gestapo chief were dropped for insufficient evidence. In 1973, after documentation was found, he was charged again in the deaths of a million, but due to Streckenbach's failing health his trial was postponed until the following year, and he died in 1977.

Katzmann disappeared at the end of the war. He returned to Germany under an assumed name, without contacting his wife and children. In 1957, dying in a Darmstadt hospital, he revealed his true identity to the chaplain. Also using a false name, Wächter made his way to Rome via ratline from Austria after the war. There he was sheltered in a Catholic college by pro-Nazi Austrian bishop Alois Hudal and lived for a time as a monk. In 1949, while preparing for a flight to South America, he was taken ill with a blood disease, and upon being taken to hospital where he died a few days later, revealed his identity.

== Alleged coordination with Soviets ==
At the same time that Aktion AB began, in April and May of 1940, the Soviet secret police massacred captured Polish prisoners of war, mostly officers captured during their invasion of Poland. There has been speculation that the two powers coordinated their targeting of Polish leadership classes. German officers were tried for Katyn after the war; the Soviets did not admit their own culpability until the USSR collapsed. The March 1940 GG meeting at which AB was authorised preceded by three days a meeting of the Soviet Politburo that similarly resulted in the decision to murder the captive Poles. At one of a series of Gestapo-NKVD conferences, held near Zakopane, it has been argued by some historians that the plans for both AB and Katyn were shared and agreed by both sides.

These allegations have been disputed. None of the documentary evidence from the Zakopane meeting, or any other Gestapo–NKVD conference, records any suggestion the two sides informed each other of their plans to murder many members of Poland's elite. Extant Soviet records also suggest that such cooperation was improbable. It has thus been reasonably assumed that the Germans were unaware of the Katyn massacres until they unearthed the bodies after taking the area in 1943 and convened the Katyn Commission.

== In popular culture ==
In William Styron's novel Sophie's Choice and its film adaptation, the title character's father and husband are revealed to both have been professors in Kraków who, despite being strongly antisemitic Nazi sympathizers, were nevertheless arrested and executed along with their colleagues.

== See also ==
- World War II atrocities in Poland
- Nazi war crimes in occupied Poland during World War II
- Pacification operations in German-occupied Poland
- Operation Tannenberg, German plan to eliminate Polish intellectuals
- Anti-Polonism
- History of Poland (1939–45)
- Chronicles of Terror, Polish national records of witness statements to war crimes

== Works cited ==
- Bartoszewski, Władysław (1970). Warszawski pierścień śmierci 1939–1944 [Warsaw Death Ring 1939-1944]. Warsaw: Interpress. ISBN 9788324712427.
- Biernacki, Stanisław (1989). Okupant a polski ruch oporu: Władze hitlerowskie w walce z ruchem oporu w dystrykcie warszawskim 1939–1944 [The occupation and the Polish resistance movement: The Nazi powers in the struggle with the resistance movement in the Warsaw District, 1939–1944] (in Polish). Warsaw: GKBZpNP-IPN. OCLC 25927807.
- Gałan, Alina (2003–2004). ""Akcja AB" na Lubelszczyźnie" ["Aktion AB" in the Lublin region]. Biuletyn IPN (in Polish). 12-1 (35-36). Warsaw: Institute of National Remembrance.
- Grzesiuk, Stanisław (2010). Pięć lat kacetu [Five Years in the Camps] (in Polish). Warssaw: Książka i Wiedza. ISBN 9788305135740.
- Kisiel, Helena (2001). "Początki okupacji niemieckiej w dystrykcie radomskim (wrzesień 1939 – czerwiec 1940)" [The beginning of the German occupation in the Radom District (September 1939 – June 1940)]. Biuletyn Kwartalny Radomskiego Towarzystwa Naukowego (in Polish). 36. Radom.
- Łojek, Jerzy (1990). Agresja 17 września 1939 [The aggression of 17 September 1939]. Warsaw: Instytut wydawniczy PAX. ISBN 8321114105.
- Mańkowski, Zygmunt (1992). Ausserordentliche Befriedungsaktion 1940 – akcja AB na ziemiach polskich: materiały z sesji naukowej (6–7 listopada 1986 r.) [Ausserordentliche Befriedungsaktion 1940 – Aktion AB on Polish soil: material from the academic session (6–7 November 1986)] (in Polish). Warsaw: Zakład Historii Najnowszej Uniwersytetu Marii Skłodowskiej-Curie i OKBZpNP-IPN w Lublinie. OCLC 568695969.
- Pietrzykowski, Jan (1971). Akcja AB w Częstochowie [Aktion AB in Częstochowa] (in Polish). Katowice, Poland: Wydawnictwo „Śląsk” i Śląski Instytut Naukowy w Katowicach. OCLC 5180784.
- Sierchuła, Rafał; Muszyński, Wojciech (4 April 2008). "Katyń i Palmiry 1940 (Dodatek specjalny IPN)" [Katyn and Palmyra 1940 (Special Appendix)]. Niezależna Gazeta Polska (in Polish). Warsaw. ISSN 2081-4763.
- Radziwończyk, Kazimierz (1966). Zbrodnie generała Streckenbacha [The Crimes of General Streckenbach] (in Polish). Warsaw: Zachodnia Agencja Prasowa. OCLC 246029897.
- Schenk, Dieter (2009). Hans Frank. Biografia generalnego gubernatora [Hans Frank: A Biography of the Governor-General] (in Polish). Kraków: Wydawnictwo Znak. ISBN 9788324012275.
- Schenk, Dieter (2017). "The Genocidal Extermination of the Polish Intelligentsia". Studia nad Totalitaryzmami i Wiekiem XX (1). Toruń, Poland: Instytut Solidarności i Męstwa im. Witolda Pileckiego: 240–253.
- Sikora, Tadeusz; Gajewski, Albert (2009). Kronika Orła Białego [The Chronicle of the White Eagle] (in Polish). Skarżysko-Kamienna: Muzeum Orła Białego. ISBN 9788392871408.
- Wardzyńska, Maria (2009). Był rok 1939. Operacja niemieckiej policji bezpieczeństwa w Polsce. Intelligenzaktion [It was 1939: Operations of the German security forces in the Polish Intelligenzaktion] (in Polish). Warsaw: Instytut Pamięci Narodowej. ISBN 9788376290638.
- Armia Krajowa w dokumentach, Tom 1: wrzesień 1939 – czerwiec 1941 [The Home Army in documents, Volume I: September 1939 – June 1941] (in Polish). Wrocław-Warsaw-Kraków-Gdańsk-Łódź: Ossolineum. 1990. ISBN 8304036290.
