= Intelligenzaktion =

Plan of extermination of Polish intelligentsia by German troops in 1939

- Part of Generalplan Ost and the genocide of Poles by Nazi Germany
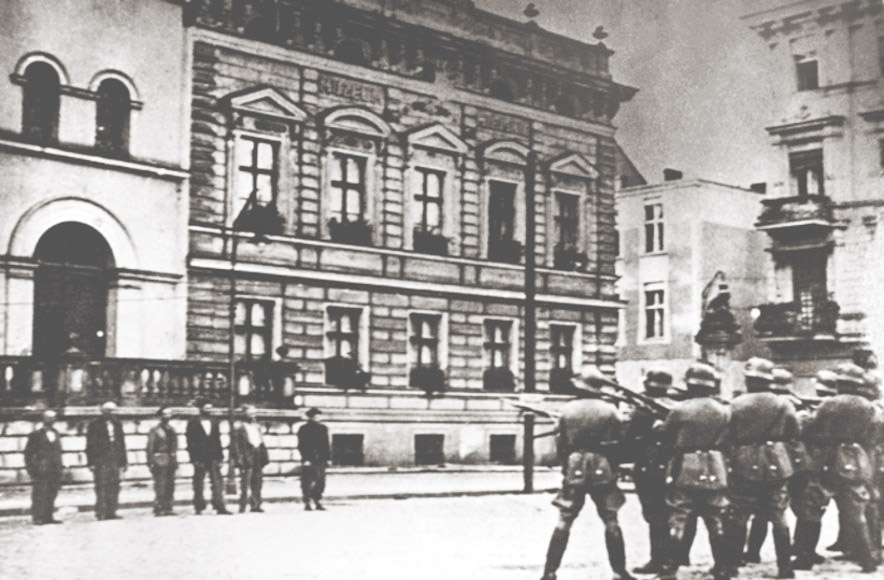
- In occupied Poland, on 9 September 1939, the Germans publicly executed twenty-five prominent citizens, in front of the Municipal Museum, in the Market Square of Bydgoszcz, as part of the mass shootings of Polish intelligentsia. To terrorise the townsfolk, the Germans displayed the bodies for six hours.
- Native name: Intelligenzaktion
- Location: Occupied Poland
- Date: 1939–1940
- Target: Poles (teachers, priests, intellectuals, civic officials, and the upper classes)
- Attack type: mass murder, mass shooting, genocidal massacres
- Weapons: Automatic weapons and small arms
- Deaths: 100,000 (61,000 from lists)
- Perpetrators: SiPo, Kripo, Gestapo, SS
- Motive: Consolidation of Nazi control of Poland, Germanisation, Anti-Polish sentiment

The Intelligenzaktion (German pronunciation: [ɪntɛliˈɡɛnt͡s.akˌt͡sjoːn] was a series of mass murders committed against the Polish intelligentsia (teachers, priests, physicians, and other prominent members of Polish society) during the early years of the Second World War (1939–45) by Nazi Germany. The Germans conducted the operations in accordance with their plan to Germanize the western regions of occupied Poland, before their territorial annexation to the German Reich.

The mass murder operations of the Intelligenzaktion resulted in the killing of 100,000 Polish people; by way of forced disappearance, the Germans imprisoned and killed select members of Polish society, identified as enemies of the Reich before the war; they were buried in mass graves in remote places. To facilitate the depopulation of occupied Poland, the Germans terrorised the general populace by carrying out public, summary executions of select intellectuals and community leaders, before they expelled the general population from occupied Poland. The executioners of the Einsatzgruppen death squads and members of the local Volksdeutscher Selbstschutz, the German-minority militia, justified their actions by falsely stating that the purpose of their police-work was to remove politically dangerous people from Polish society.

The Intelligenzaktion was a major step towards the implementation of Sonderaktion Tannenberg (Special Operation Tannenberg), the installation of Nazi policemen and functionaries—from the SiPo (composed of Kripo and Gestapo members), and members of the SD—to manage the occupation and facilitate the realization of Generalplan Ost, the German colonization of Poland. Among the 100,000 people who were killed in the Intelligenzaktion operations, approximately 61,000 of them were members of the Polish intelligenzia, people who the Germans considered political targets according to the Special Prosecution Book – Poland, a book which was compiled before the war began in September 1939. The Intelligenzaktion occurred soon after the German invasion of Poland (1 September 1939), and lasted from the autumn of 1939 until the spring of 1940; the mass murder of the Polish intellectuals continued with the operations of the AB-Aktion.

== Purpose ==
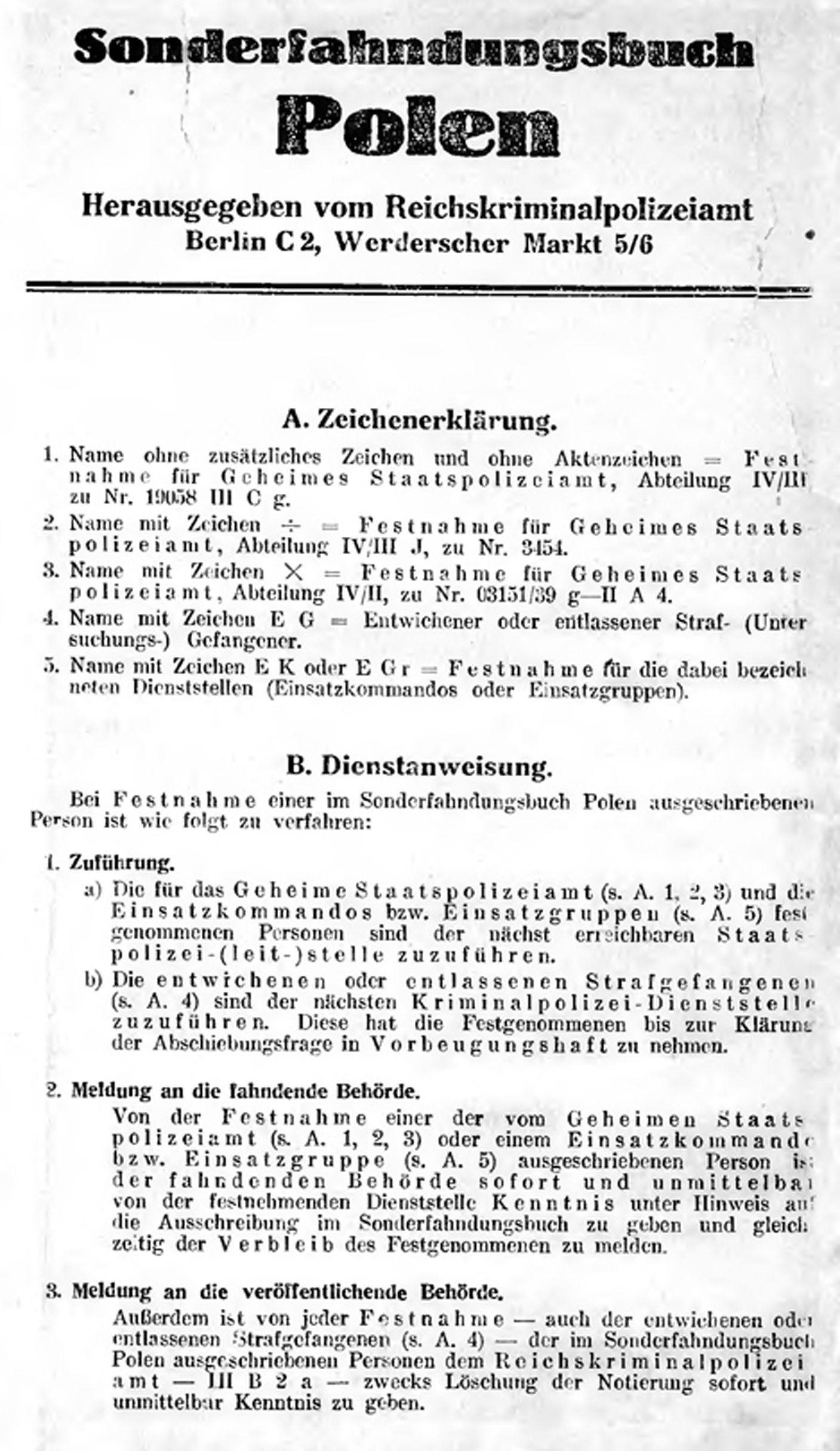
Sonderfahndungsbuch Polen book – lists of 60,000 targets in Intelligenzaktion

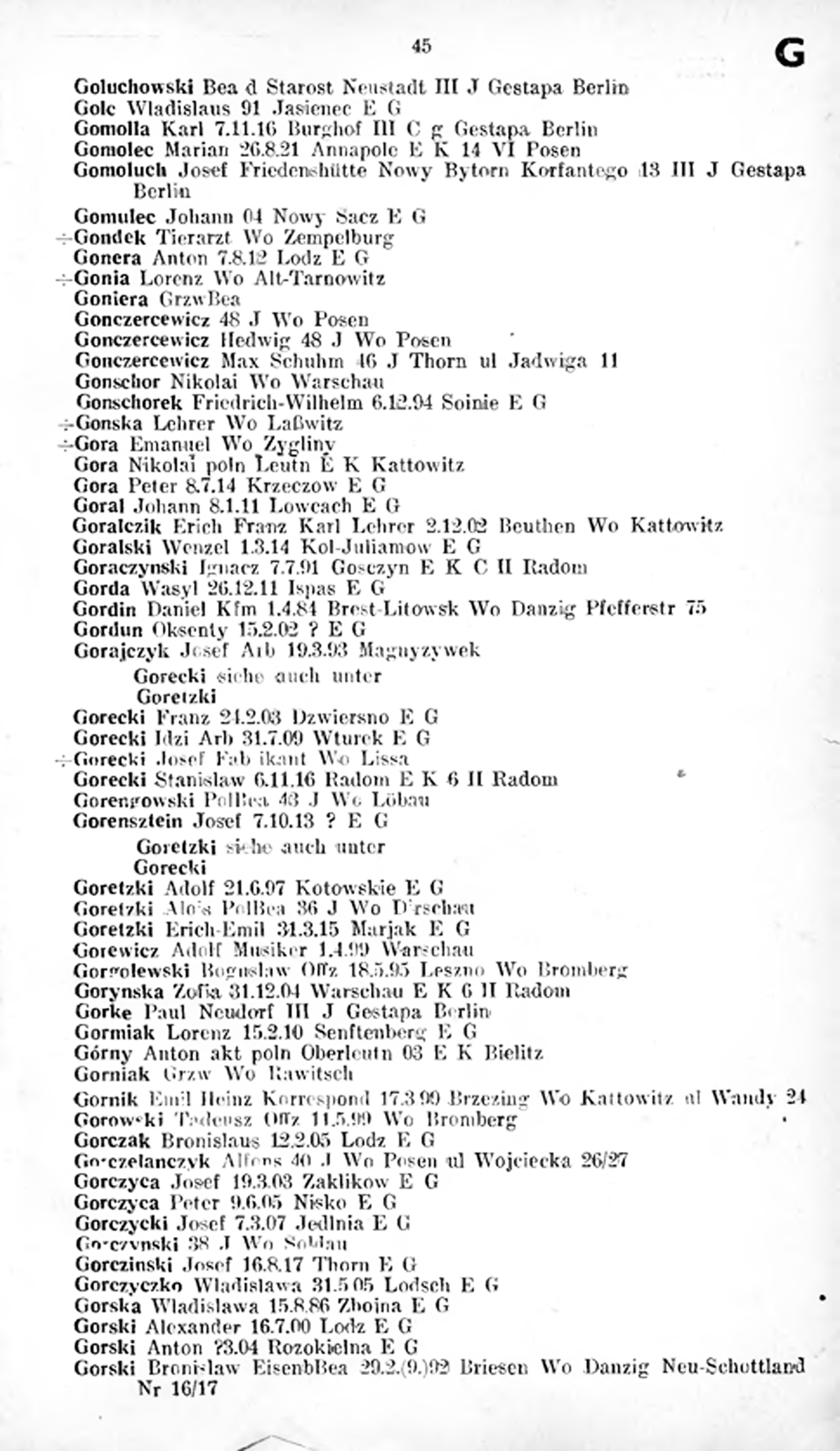
Sonderfahndungsbuch Polen – page with names under the letter "G" with abbreviations. EK stands for Einsatzkommando death squad, and EG stands for Einsatzgruppen authorities.

Adolf Hitler ordered the murder of the intelligentsia and the social élites of Poland to prevent them from organising the Poles against their German masters, and thwart the occupation and colonisation of the country; the mass murder was to occur before the annexation of western Poland to the Greater Germanic Reich:

Once more, the Führer must point out that the Poles can only have one master, and that is the German; two masters cannot and must not exist side by side; therefore, all representatives of the Polish intelligentsia should be eliminated [umbringen]. This sounds harsh, but such are the laws of life.

Nazi racialism considered the Polish élites as being most likely of German blood, because their style of dynamic leadership contrasted positively against the “Slavonic fatalism” of the Russian people; nonetheless, the extermination of such national leaders was necessary, because their patriotism (moral authority) would prevent the full-scale Germanization of the enslaved populace of Poland.

Moreover, by way of the Rassenpolitisches Amt der NSDAP (Nazi Party Office of Racial Policy), the racially valuable (Aryan-looking) children of the Polish intelligentsia were to be kidnapped to the Reich proper, for Germanization; Nazi ideology claimed that such non-Slavic acculturation would prevent the generational resurgence of the Polish intelligentsia, and thus prevent the resurgence of Polish nationalism in Germanised Poland.

== Method ==
Upon controlling Poland, the Germans arrested, imprisoned, and killed approximately 61,000 people as enemies of the German Reich, all of whom were identified as the intelligentsia of each city, town, and village. Each man and woman was biographically listed in the Special Prosecution Book – Poland (Sonderfahndungsbuch Polen), which German citizens of Poland loyal to the Nazi party in the German Reich compiled before the war for the German police and security forces of the SiPo (Security Police) and the SD (Security Service).

The Einsatzgruppen and the Volksdeutscher Selbstschutz, the Ethnic Self-defence militia of the German minority in Poland, were to kill the intelligentsia identified in the Special Prosecution Book–Poland. Aware they would be killing unarmed civilians, the commanders of the paramilitary militias strengthened morale with ideological and racialist instructions to the soldier–policemen, that their political role in the ethnic cleansing of Poland (executions, counterinsurgency, policing) would be more difficult than fighting in battle against soldiers; as noted by Martin Bormann, in a meeting (2 October 1940) between Hitler and Hans Frank:

The Führer must emphasize, once again, that for Poles there is only one master, and he is a German; there can be no two masters, beside each other, and there is no consent to such, hence, all representatives of the Polish intelligentsia are to be killed. . . . The General Government is a Polish reservation, a great Polish labour camp.

As part of Generalplan Ost, the political purpose of the Intelligenzaktion was extermination of the élites of Polish society, which the Nazis broadly defined as the Szlachta (Polish nobility), the intelligentsia, teachers, social workers, judges, military veterans, priests and businessmen; any Polish man and woman who had attended secondary school, and so could provide nationalist leadership to resist the German occupation of Poland.

== Regional operations ==
1. Intelligenzaktion Pommern, a regional mass murder operation in the Pomeranian Voivodeship; 23,000 Poles were arrested, imprisoned, and killed soon after identification and arrest. To terrorise the general populace, the Germans then selected prominent citizens, from the arrested people, and publicly executed them, leaving the corpses on display, as formal warning against resistance to German occupation.
2. Intelligenzaktion Posen, the mass murder of 2,000 victims from Poznań.
3. Intelligenzaktion Masovien, regional mass murder in the Masovian Voivodeship, 1939–40, 6,700 people killed, from Ostrołęka, Wyszków, Ciechanów, Wysokie Mazowieckie, and Giełczyn, near Łomża.
4. Intelligenzaktion Schlesien, regional mass murder in the Silesian Voivodeship in 1940; 2,000 Poles killed.
5. Intelligenzaktion Litzmannstadt, regional mass murder in Łódź, 1939; 1,500 people killed.
6. Sonderaktion Krakau, mass arrest of intelligentsia, 183 professors from Jagiellonian University, whom the Germans deported to Sachsenhausen concentration camp.
7. Zweite Sonderaktion Krakau
8. Sonderaktion Tschenstochau in Częstochowa
9. Sonderaktion Lublin, regional mass murder in Lublin; 2,000 people killed, most were priests of the Roman Catholic Church.
10. Sonderaktion Bürgerbräukeller in the Łódź Voivodeship
11. Professorenmord, mass murder of the intelligentsia in the Stanisławów, the Kresy region, Czarny Las Massacre; 250–300 Polish academics killed.

== See also ==
- Germanisation#Germanisation in the east
- Kulturkampf#Anti-Polish aspect of Kulturkampf
- Chronicles of Terror
- Nazi crimes against the Polish nation
- Polish areas annexed by Nazi Germany
- Gestapo–NKVD conferences (1939–1940)
- Katyn massacre
- Soviet repressions of Polish citizens (1939–1946)
- The Holocaust in Poland
- Destruction of Warsaw
- The Forgotten Holocaust
