= Rury, Lublin =

Rury
- Lublin District
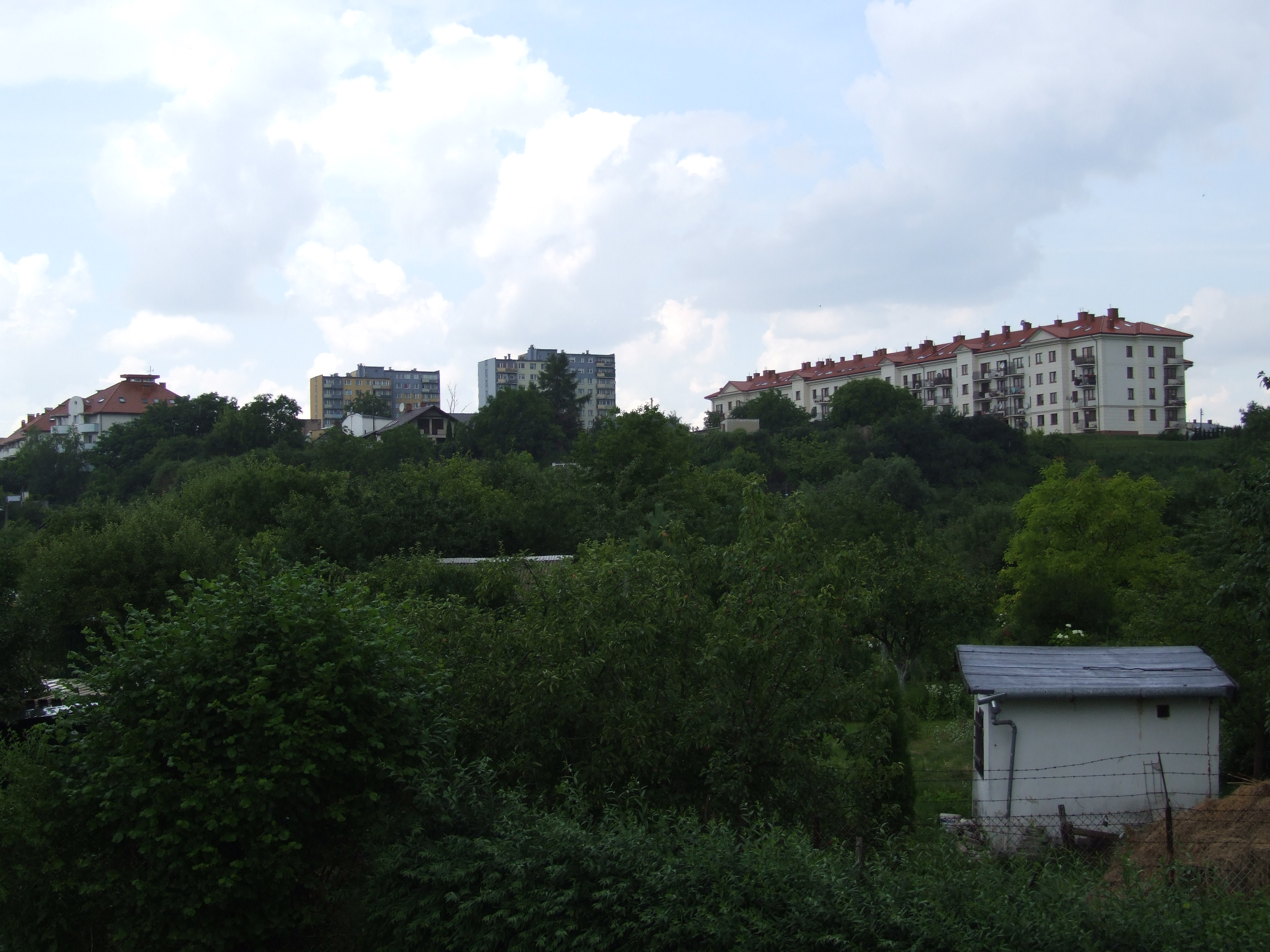
- View upon allotments and apartments by Nadbystrzycka Street

- Location of Rury within Lublin
- Coordinates: 51°14′19″N 22°30′59″E
- Country: Poland
- Voivodeship: Lublin
- County/City: Lublin

Area
  - Total: 3.61 km^{2} (1.39 sq mi)

Population (2016)
  - Total: 30,093
  - Density: 8,340/km^{2} (21,600/sq mi)
- Time zone: UTC+1 (CET)
  - Summer (DST): UTC+2 (CEST)
- Postal code: 80-506; 80-528
- Area code: +48 58
- Vehicle registration: LU

Rury is one of the quarters of the city of Lublin, Poland located in the west-central part of the city. The district grew upon the hillside, former city fields, extending to Konopnica. From February 23, 2006 the district became an administrative region of Lublin.

== History ==
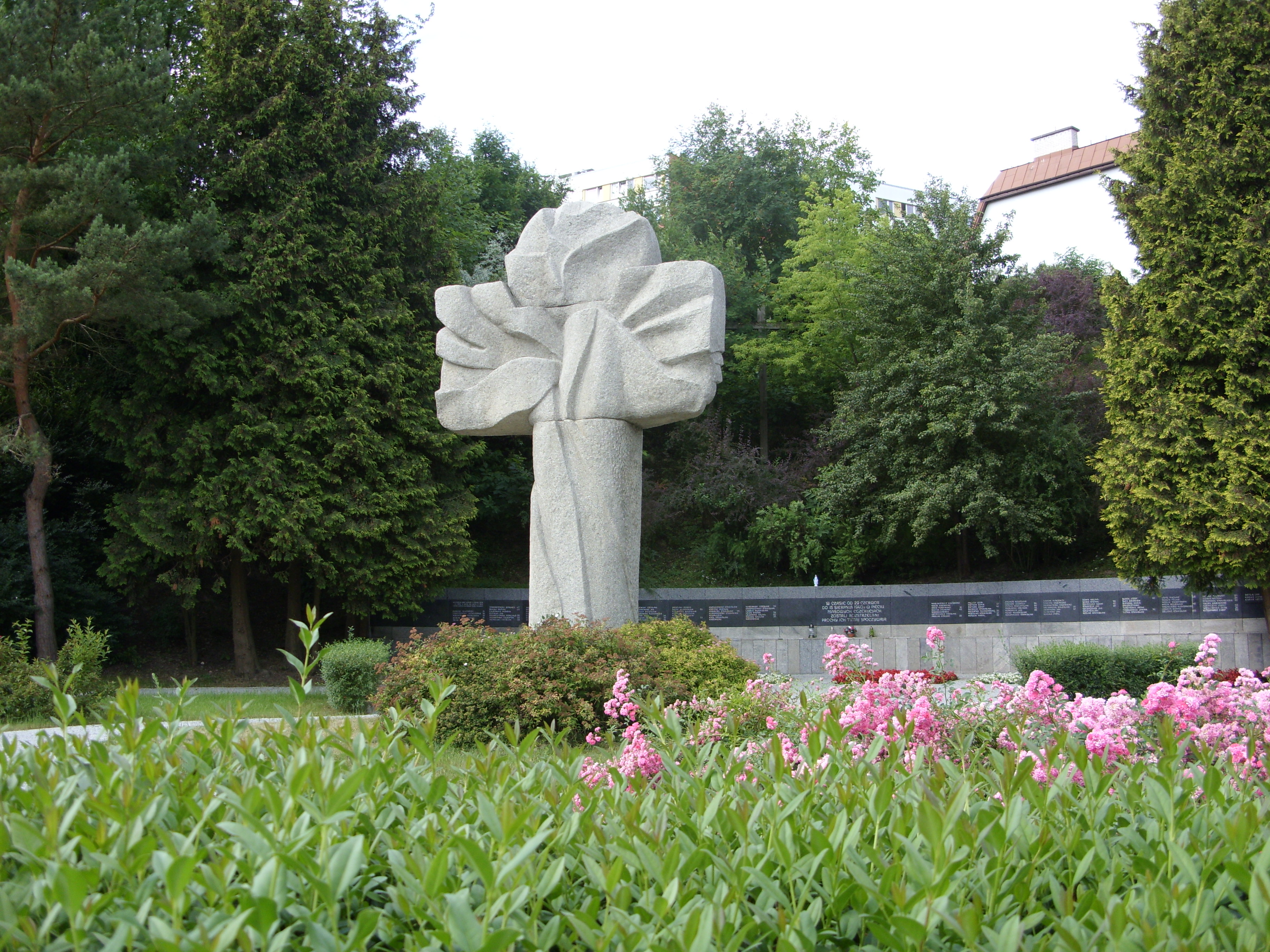
Memorial and mass grave of Poles murdered by the Germans in Rury in 1940

During the German occupation of Poland (World War II), in 1940, the Germans murdered about 500 Poles from the region in several massacres in the settlement of Rury Jezuickie, now located within the district. Among the victims were activists, students, doctors, engineers, local officials, judges, lawyers, military officers, members of the Sejm (Polish parliament), etc. There is a memorial at the site. The quarter is also the birthplace of the former Polish Communist Politician, Bolesław Bierut.
