= Timeline of Lublin =

The following is a timeline of the history of the city of Lublin, Poland.

== Middle Ages ==
- In between 501–600: The creation of settlements on Czwartek hill ("Thursday"). Czwartek was a rural settlement. It is considered the oldest early medieval settlement of Lublin. Archaeological excavations have revealed the remains of 20 residential half-dugouts and several cavities of an economic nature.
- In between 501–600: The creation of the settlement on Grodzisko

From the 6th century people started erecting their settlements on Grodzisko hill (Today called Castle Hill). Later the settlement had facilities for business and was servicing the Gord.

- In between 701–800: First castle erected on the hill Old Town

In the eighth century, Hill Old Town was a place where a tribal stronghold was built.

- 1050–1125: Undocumented church assumption on Czwartek (currently a city district). The Church of St. Nicholas situated on the steep hill is considered the oldest church in Lublin.
- 1190–1205: The mention of Lublin in the "Chronicle" of Wincenty Kadłubek
- 1198: The oldest source record name of Lublin - "Lubelnia", the rise of Lublin archdeaconry

Lublin is one of the oldest cities in Poland. According to both Dlugosz and Kadłubek the founding of the city took place in 810. The first preserved sources mention the name of the city however, only from the XII-XIII .: "de Lubelnia" (1198). "Lublin" (1224). Sources are documents of ordinary official operations - the document attesting to the creation of the Lublin archdeaconry unit, forming part of the diocese of Kraków.

- 1205: Defense of Lublin from the invasion of Prince Roman Mstislavic's troops. Information appeared in "History of Poland" published in the fifteenth century by Jan Długosz. The city was besieged by Prince Roman. They ceased besiege and retreated when behind the line of Vistula River troops of Leszek the White began to gather.
- 1224: Sources of information about Castellans of Lublin
- 1230 - 1235: The arrival of the Dominican Order in Lublin. It seems that the Dominicans came to Lublin already around 1230, although the origins of their activities are covered by the darkness of history. Usually setting Ordo Fratrum Praedicatorum indicated a high rank of the city. It is known that years later they built their first wooden church.
- 1241: First Mongol invasion of Poland - robbery and destruction of Lublin. The devastation of the area during the march of the Mongol troops was written extensively by Jan Długosz in the seventh book of "Annals or Chronicles of the Famous Kingdom Polish."
- 1474: Lublin became capital of the newly formed Lublin Voivodeship within Poland.

== 16th to 19th centuries ==
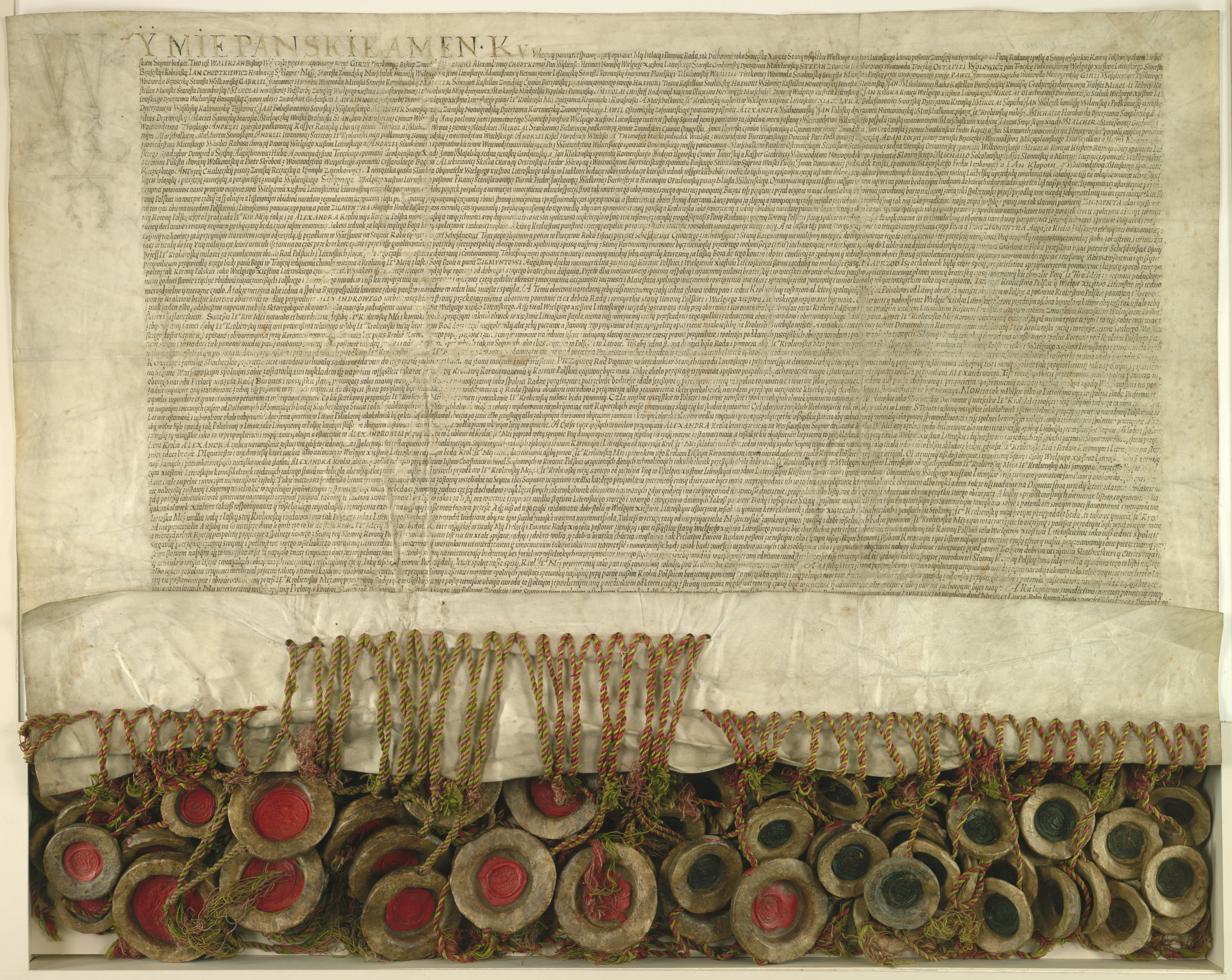
Act of the Union of Lublin from 1569

- 1506: Sejm of the Kingdom of Poland held in Lublin.
- 1554: Sejm of the Kingdom of Poland held in Lublin.
- 1566: Sejm of the Kingdom of Poland held in Lublin.
- 1569
  - Sejm of the Kingdom of Poland held in Lublin.
  - June 28: Union of Lublin signed.
  - July 27: Albert Frederick, Duke of Prussia paid homage to King of Poland Sigismund II Augustus.
- 1578: Crown Tribunal of the Lesser Poland Province of the Crown of the Kingdom of Poland placed in Lublin. It was the highest appeal court of the province.
- 1594: Poet and composer Sebastian Klonowic became mayor of Lublin.
- 1625: Baroque St. John the Baptist Cathedral completed.
- 1644: Lublin Renaissance St. Joseph's Church completed.
- 1703: Sejm of the Polish–Lithuanian Commonwealth held in Lublin.
- 1786: Church of St. Josaphat completed.
- 1809: Polish 13th Hussar Regiment formed in Lublin.
- 1815: Lublin became part of the Russian Partition of Poland.
- 1826: Union of Lublin monument unveiled.

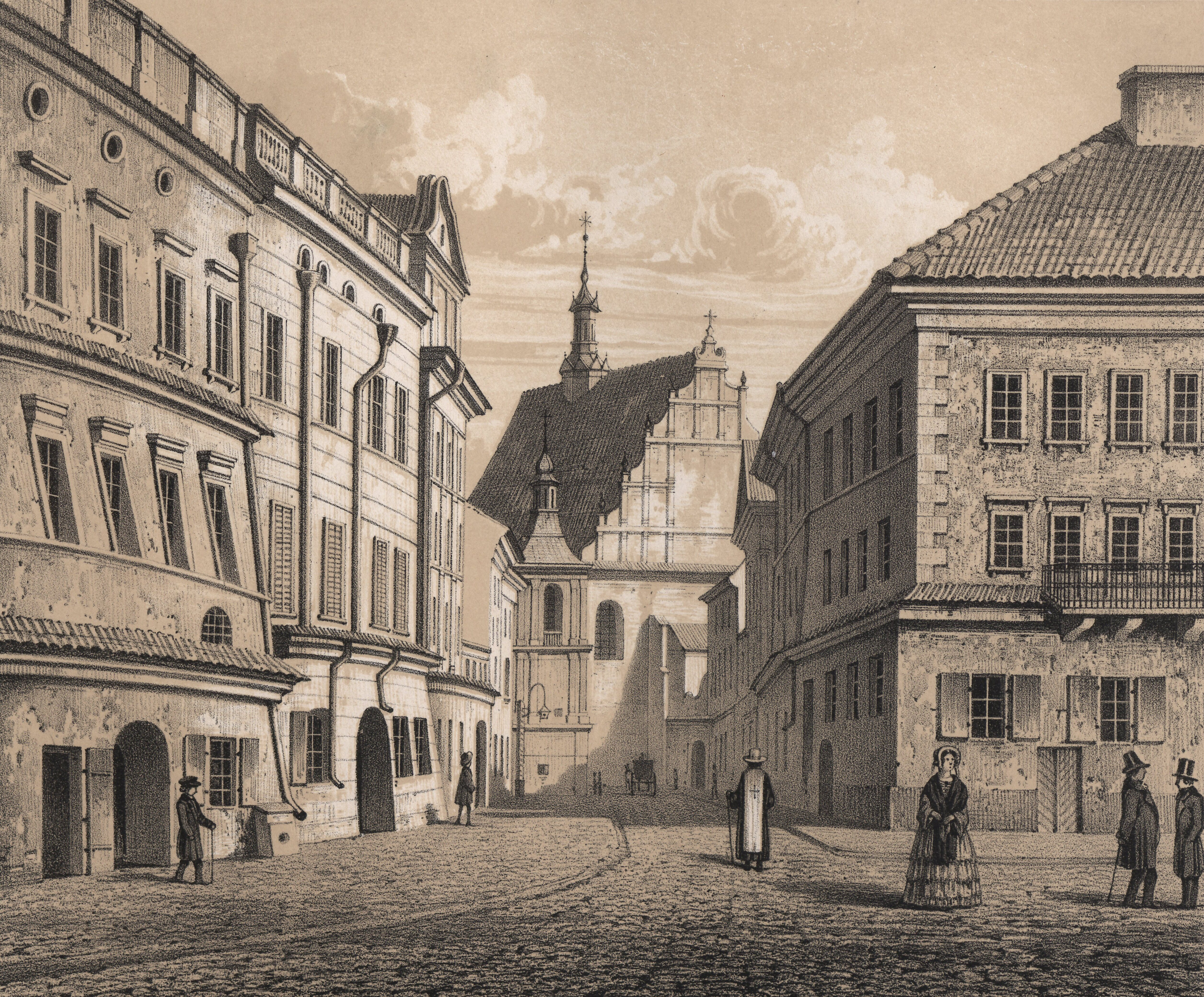
Lublin Old Town in 1860

- 1863
  - 29 June: Clash between Polish insurgents and Russian troops during the January Uprising.
  - 18 August: Clash between Polish insurgents and Russian troops during the January Uprising.
  - 18 October: Clash between Polish insurgents and Russian troops during the January Uprising.
  - 25 October: Clash between Polish insurgents and Russian troops during the January Uprising.
- 1877: Lublin Główny railway station opened.
- 1894: District Courthouse completed.
- 1900: Grand Hotel Lublinianka completed.

== Early 20th century ==
- 1909 - Population: 65,870.
- 1915: World War I: Lublin becomes capital of the Military Government of Lublin under Austro-Hungarian occupation.
- 1916: Constitution of 3 May 1791 monument unveiled.
- 1918
  - July 27: Catholic University of Lublin established.
  - November 1–2: a congress of various Polish scout organizations was held in Lublin, at which the Polish scout movement was unified into the Polish Scouting and Guiding Association.
  - November: 7th Lublin Uhlan Regiment formed in Lublin.
- 1921: KS Lublinianka football club founded.
- 1931: Jan Kochanowski monument unveiled.

== World War II ==
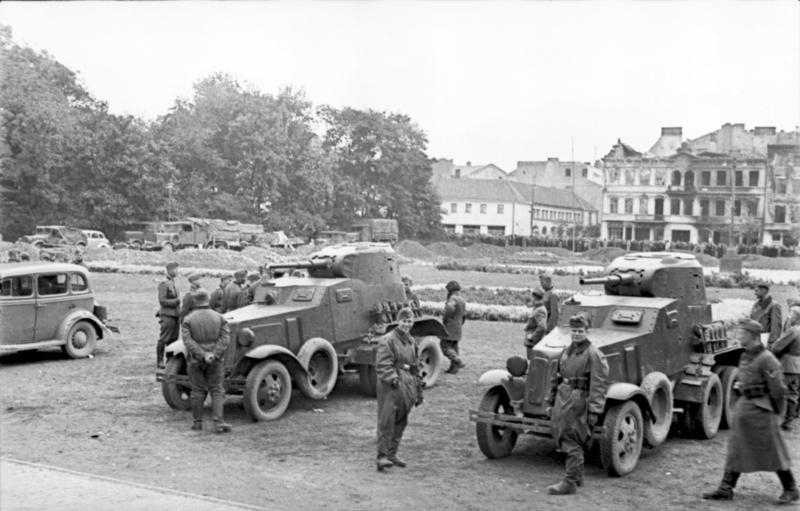
German and Soviet troops in Lublin during the invasion of Poland in September 1939

- 1939
  - September 4–5: part of the Polish gold reserve evacuated from Warsaw to Lublin by the Polish government during the German invasion of Poland, which started World War II.
  - September 7–8: the Polish gold reserve was evacuated further east to Łuck.
  - November 9: the Germans carried out mass arrests of hundreds of Poles, including teachers, judges, lawyers, engineers and priests, as part of the Intelligenzaktion.
  - November 11: the Germans carried out arrests of 14 lecturers of the Catholic University of Lublin.
  - November 17: the Germans closed down the Catholic University of Lublin and arrested around 60 of its students, as well as many local priests and lecturers of the local theological seminary.
  - December 23–24: the Germans carried out an execution of 21 well-known and respected citizens of the region in Lublin.
  - December 25: the German police carried out an execution of 10 Poles at the local Lemszczyzna brick factory. Among the victims were local lawyers, professors, school principals and starosts of Lublin and Lubartów counties.
- 1940
  - January 25: the Germans carried out arrests of 23 Capuchin friars.
  - February 2: the Germans carried out arrests of 43 Jesuit friars.
  - April–May: the Russians carried out executions of many Poles from Lublin, including 94 lecturers, alumni and students of the Catholic University of Lublin during the large Katyn massacre.
  - June 24: the Germans carried out mass arrests of over 800 Poles, as part of the AB-Aktion.
  - June 29: the Germans committed a massacre of Poles in the present-day district of Rury.
  - June–July: deportation of around 1,000 Poles from the Lublin Castle to the Sachsenhausen concentration camp.
  - July 3: the Germans committed a massacre of Poles in the present-day district of Rury.
  - July 5: the Germans committed a massacre of Poles in the present-day district of Rury.
  - August 15: the Germans committed a massacre of Poles in the present-day district of Rury.
  - October: deportation of around 100 Poles from the Lublin Castle to the Auschwitz concentration camp.
  - December 31: the Germans committed a massacre of Poles in the present-day district of Rury.
- 1941
  - March: Lublin Ghetto established by the occupiers.
  - August 21: Stalag 301 German prisoner-of-war camp for Allied POWs relocated from Sieradz to Lublin.
  - September: Stalag 301 camp relocated from Lublin to Kowel.
  - October: Majdanek concentration camp established by the occupiers.
- 1943
  - the Germans imprisoned around 9,000 expelled Poles from the Zamojszczyzna region in the Majdanek concentration camp and in a transit camp at Krochmalna Street; many were then deported to forced labour in Germany.
  - August: around 2,200 people were released from the camps at Majdanek and Krochmalna Street thanks to efforts of the Polish Rada Główna Opiekuńcza charity organisation.

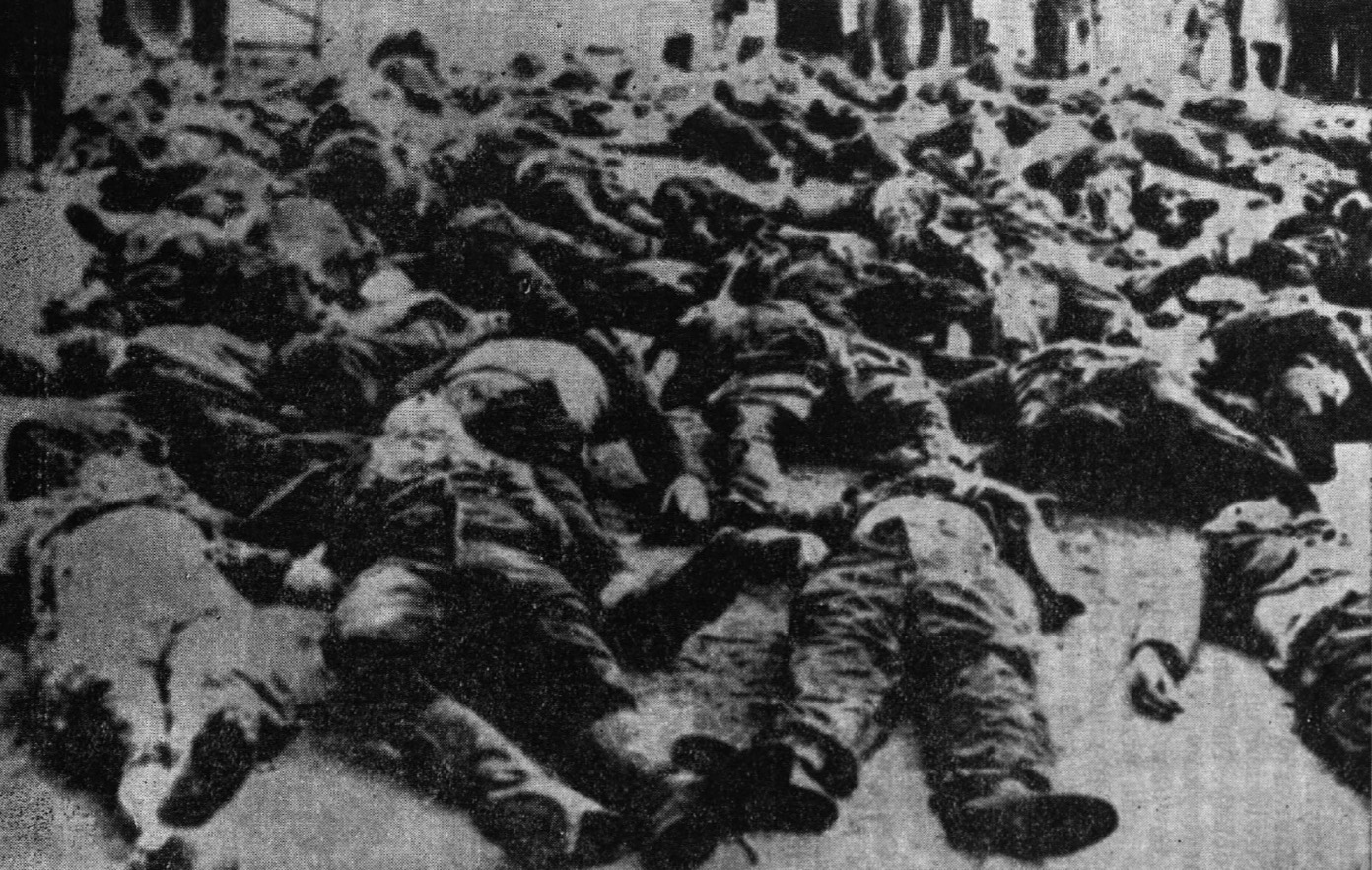
Victims of Nazi Germany found in the castle in 1944

- 1944
  - July 22: Majdanek concentration camp dissolved.
  - July 22: Massacre of over 300 prisoners perpetrated by the Germans at the Lublin Castle.
  - July 24: City captured by the Soviet Army.
  - August 3: The Soviets arrested Władysław Cholewa, the regional delegate of Polish government-in-exile.
  - August 4: The Soviets arrested Colonel Kazimierz Tumidajski, the commander of the regional branch of the Home Army.
  - Autumn: Communist prison and court established by the Soviets at the Lublin Castle.
  - December 30–31: Związek Samopomocy Chłopskiej (transl. Peasants' Mutual Aid Association) founded.
- 1945 – September: Tajna Organizacja Wojskowa (Secret Military Organization) and Bój Polish anti-communist resistance organizations founded.

== Post-war period ==
- 1946
  - February: Bojówka o Niepodległość Polish anti-communist resistance organization founded.
  - August: Polish military anti-communist resistance Tracz Organization founded.
- 1948: Stalowi Polacy (Steel Poles) Polish anti-communist resistance organization founded.
- 1949
  - October: Młodzieżowa Organizacja Niepodległościowa (Youth Independence Organization) Polish anti-communist resistance organization founded.
  - December: Ruch Wyzwolenia Młodzieży Słowiańskiej (Slavic Youth Liberation Movement) Polish anti-communist resistance organization founded.
- 1950
  - February: Trójki Polish anti-communist resistance organization founded.
  - April: Podziemny Ruch Wyzwoleńczy (Underground Liberation Movement) Polish anti-communist resistance organization founded.
  - FSC Lublin Automotive Factory founded.
  - Motor Lublin football club founded.
- 1954
  - Prison at the Lublin Castle closed; cultural center opened there.
  - Karol Wojtyła (future Pope John Paul II) starts lecturing at the Catholic University of Lublin.
- 1956
  - October: Establishment of a civic committee to organize aid for the Hungarian Revolution of 1956. Mass raising of food, medical supplies and blood donation for Hungarian insurgents (see also Hungary–Poland relations).
  - 25 October: First blood shipment to Hungary.
- 1957: Museum opened at the Lublin Castle.
- 1964: Marie Curie-Skłodowska Monument unveiled.
- 1969: Lublin hosts the 4th Women's Chess Olympiad.
- 1973: Nicolaus Copernicus monument unveiled.
- 1978: Henryk Wieniawski monument unveiled.
- 1980: Strikes.
- 1987: Visit of Pope John Paul II.
- 1992: Roman Catholic Diocese of Lublin promoted to Archdiocese.
- 1995: Sister city partnership signed between Lublin and Debrecen, Hungary.

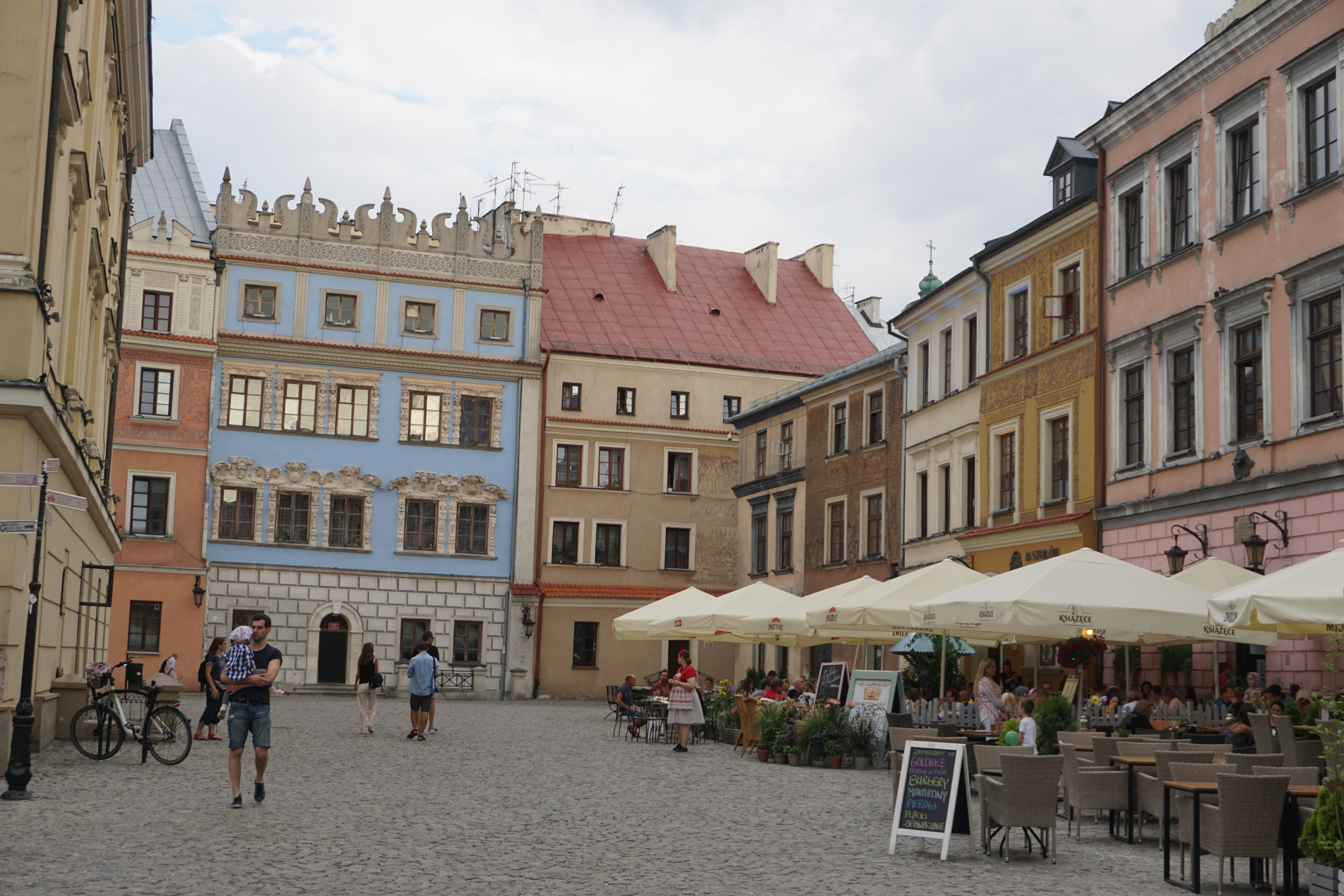
Lublin Old Town in 2019

- 2001: Józef Piłsudski monument unveiled.
- 2014
  - Arena Lublin completed.
  - 18 October: Sister city partnership signed between Lublin and Tbilisi, Georgia.
- 2017: Khachkar unveiled.
- 2018
  - June: Honorary Consulate of Slovenia opened.
  - July 11: Monument to the victims of Massacres of Poles in Volhynia and Eastern Galicia unveiled.
- 2019: Lublin co-hosts the 2019 FIFA U-20 World Cup.
- 2020
  - July 28: The Lublin Triangle format of regional cooperation is signed in a joint declaration by the foreign ministers of Poland, Ukraine and Lithuania.
  - October: Monument of Hungarian gratitude for Polish solidarity and aid for the Hungarian Revolution of 1956 unveiled.
- 2022: Motor Lublin wins its first Team Speedway Polish Championship.
- 2023: Lublin designated the European Youth Capital.

== See also ==
- Lublin history
- History of Lublin

== Bibliography ==
- "Lublin (town)" . Encyclopædia Britannica. Vol. 17 (11th ed.). 1911. p. 87.
- "Lublin", Russia, Leipzig: Karl Baedeker, 1914, OCLC 1328163
