= Orangery in Radzyń Podlaski =

The Orangery Oranżeria (in Polish)
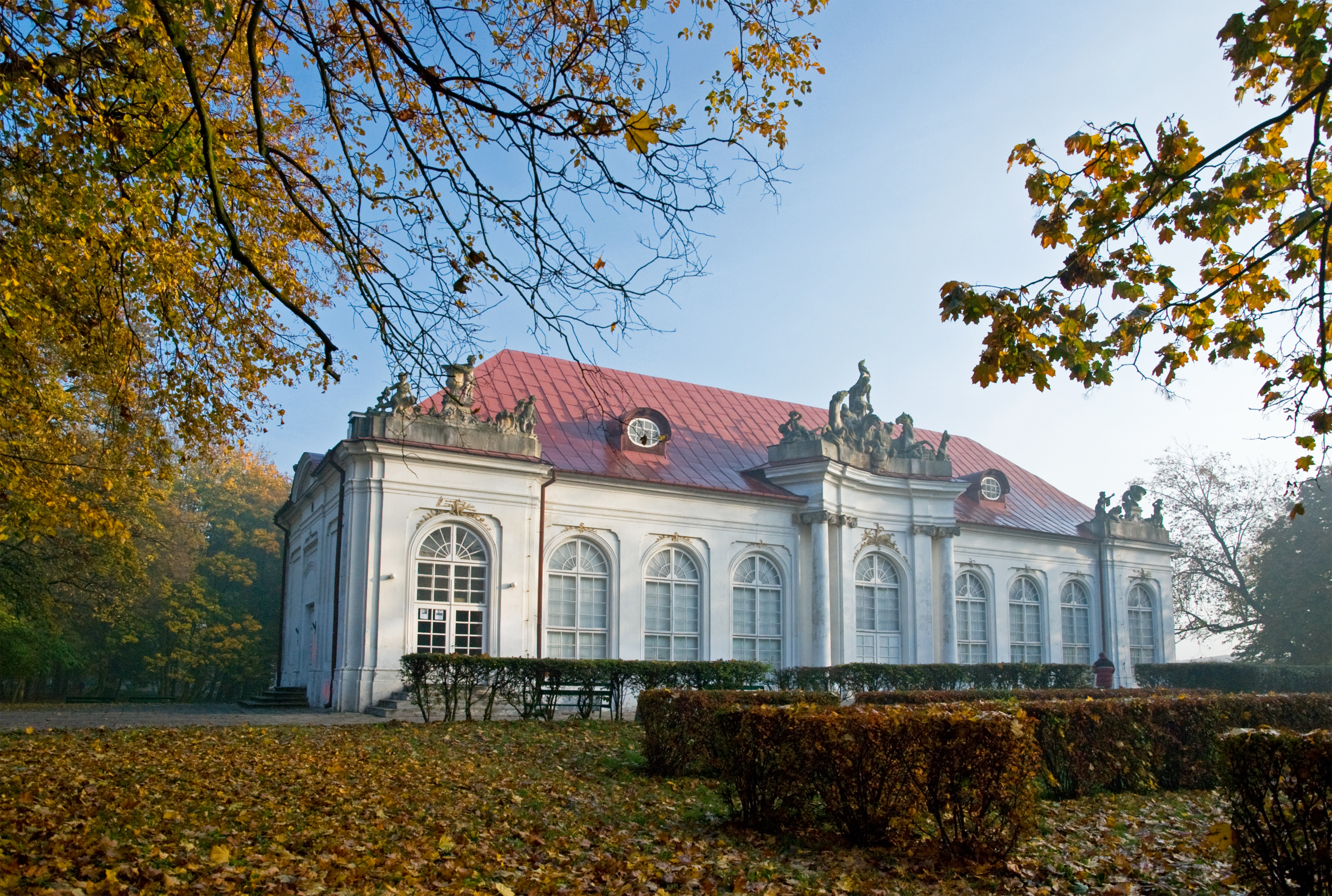
- Interactive map of The Orangery; Oranżeria (in Polish)

General information
- Architectural style: Rococo
- Location: Radzyń Podlaski, Poland
- Coordinates: 51.78417498940011°N 22.624142274873112°E
- Year built: 1760–63

Design and construction
- Architect: Jakub Fontana

The Orangery (or Orangehouse, Polish: Oranżeria, Polish pronunciation: [ɔranʐɛrʲa]) is a building designed by Jakub Fontana, that was completed between 1760 to 1763, and is part of the palace and park complex in Radzyń Podlaski, Poland. The Orangery is a notable example of Rococo architecture. One of the most important elements of the building is a sculpture by Jan Chryzostom Redler depicting Apollo's chariot. The building now serves as a conference and concert hall and is also a place for the hosting of important social events for the residents of Radzyń Podlaski. The Orangery is also the seat of the Radzyń Cultural Centre (Polish: Radzyński Ośrodek Kultury).

== History ==
=== 18th century ===
The orangery was constructed in the final phase of transforming the old palace into a grand noble residence and has been an integral part of the palace and park complex since its inception. This transformation was commissioned by Eustachy Potocki and his wife, Marianna from the Kątski family.

The orangery was used for cultivating exotic plants and storing plants that could not survive the winter in temperate climates. It also functioned as a winter garden. In the "Opis Parafiów" of 1783, it was mentioned: "A splendid garden with gardener's outbuildings, a brick orangery with a greenhouse, in which many fruit trees, flowers, and other things pleasing to the human eye can be found."

=== 19th century ===
At the beginning of the 19th century the Radzyń estate was sold by the Potocki family to Princess Anna Sapieżyna. Her daughter, Anna Zofia, brought it as a dowry to Adam Jerzy Czartoryski in 1817. After the fall of the November uprising and the confiscation of the Czartoryski estates, the residence, which had been put up for auction, was purchased by Antoni Korwin Szlubowski. The palace and park complex (and the Orangery) remained in the hands of his family until 1920.

=== First half of the 20th century ===
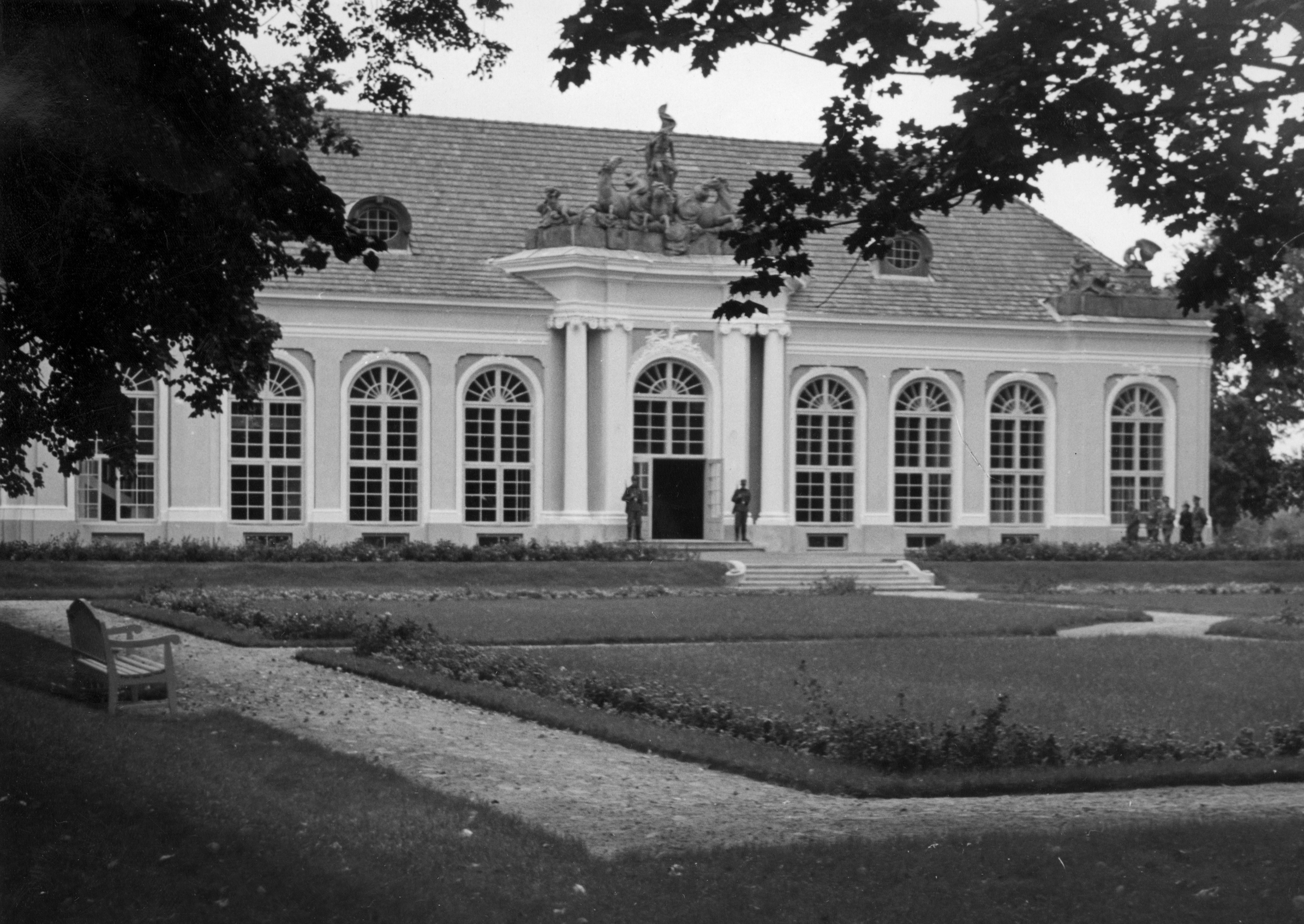
The facade of the Orangery renovated by the German occupiers, 1939–44

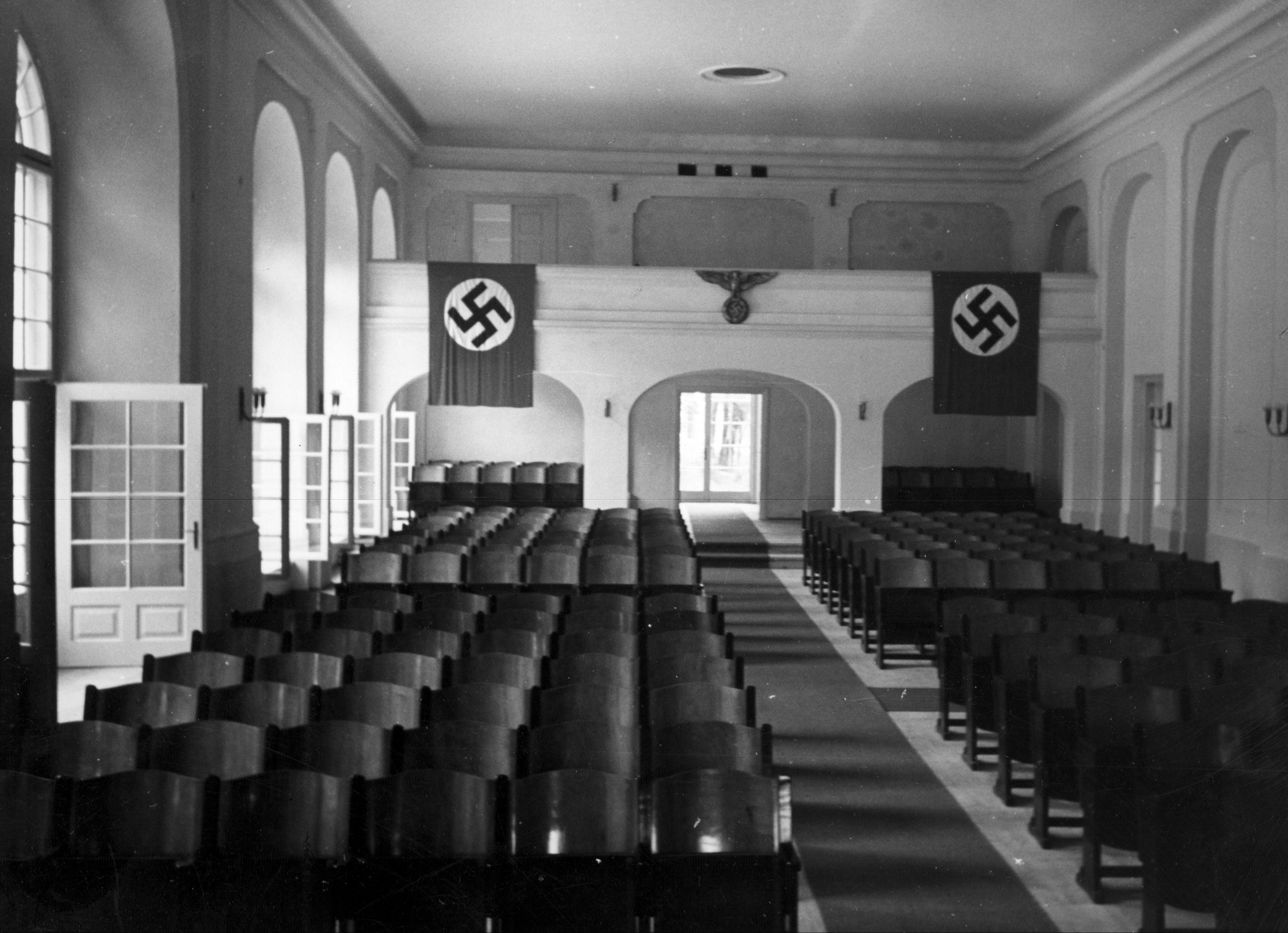
Interior of the German House in the Orangery

After the establishment of the independent Polish State, on 29 May 1920, Bronisław Szlubowski – Antoni's grandson – transferred the palace and park complex, including the Orangery and 19 hectares of land, to the state treasury for military purposes. During this period, the Orangery's condition deteriorated, and its interior contained a warehouse for gardening tools.

In August 1939, a group of residents from Radzyń Podlaski, affiliated with the Society of Stage and Music Enthusiasts (Polish: Towarzystwo Miłośników Sceny i Muzyki), petitioned the city authorities for the orangery building to establish a theatre. But their plans were interrupted by the outbreak of World War II. Between 1939 and 1943, the orangery was renovated and adapted into a German House with a concert hall featuring an integrated music gallery.

After the German troops withdrew from Radzyń Podlaski in July 1944, the furnishings of the German House were stolen by the town's residents. The final devastation of the building was carried out by Red Army soldiers after they entered and took control of the city in the same year.

=== Second half of the 20th century ===
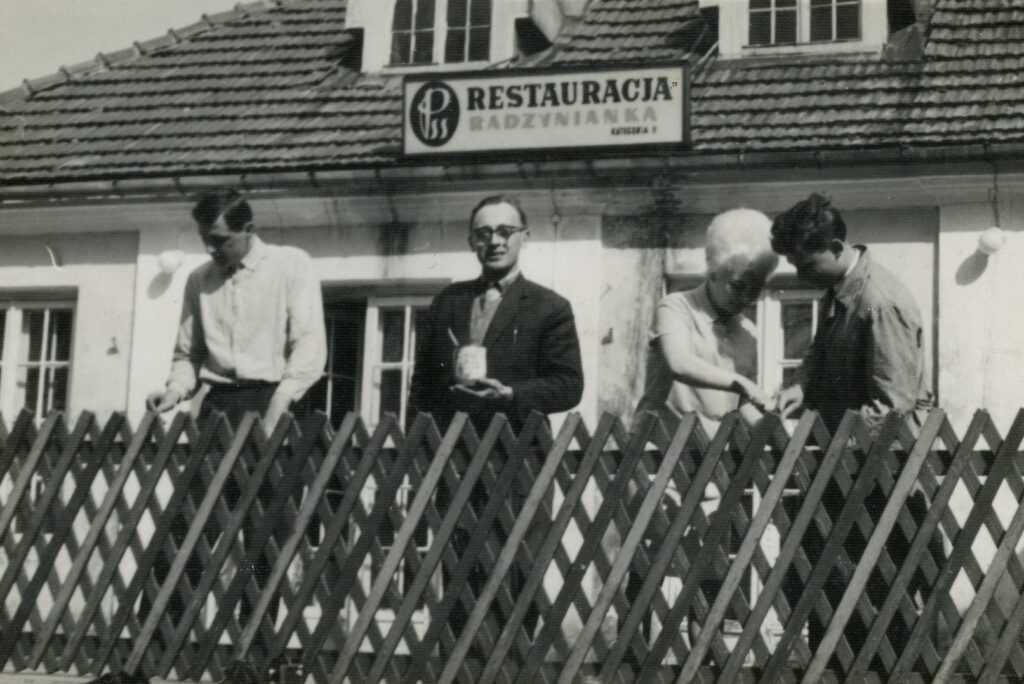
Employees of the "Radzynianka" restaurant on the terrace of the Orangery in Radzyń Podlaski

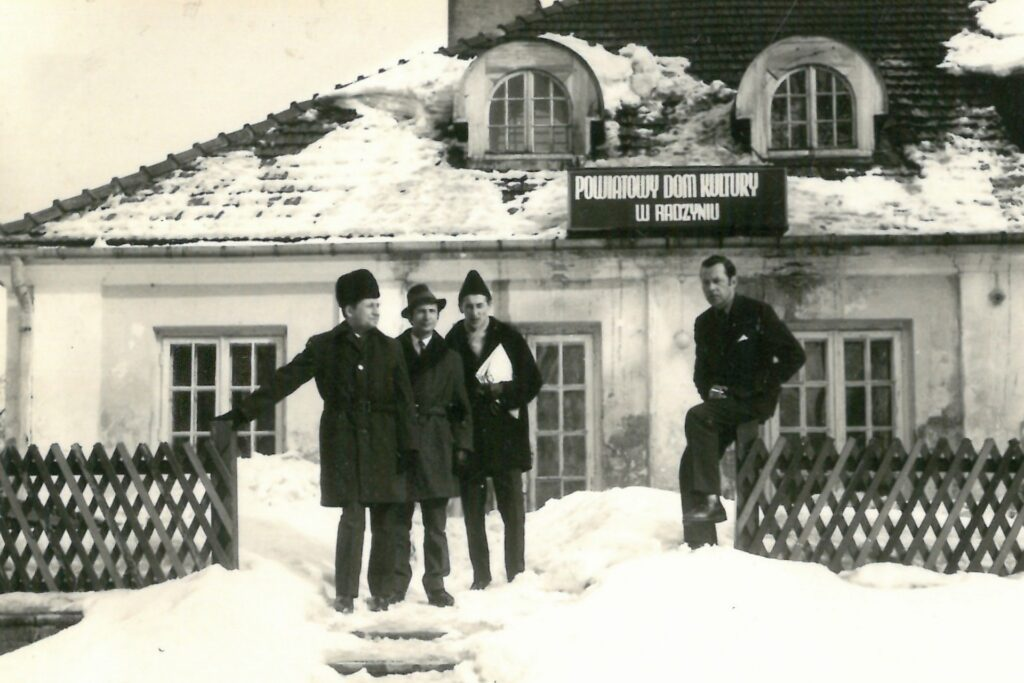
Residents in the background of the District Cultural Center in the Orangery in Radzyń Podlaski

After the war, in 1946, efforts were made to renovate the historic Orangery. The building housed the House of Culture and Art (Polish: Dom Kultury i Sztuki), and together with it a theatre, concert hall, library, reading room, canteen and apartments for the manager and administrative supervision. Since then, the Orangery has permanently become the main place of cultural and social meetings for the residents of Radzyń Podlaski.

For a certain period, until 1968, the Orangery also housed the "Radzynianka" restaurant, run by the General Consumer Cooperative.

The Orangery housed a cinema known as "Jelonek" until 1975, and then as the "Oranżeria" cinema. It was a popular venue for film screenings and various cultural events. Since 1968, the Orangery has become the seat of the cultural center, which has operated under various names over the years. From its inception until 1975, it was known as the District Cultural Hall. From 1975 to 1994, it operated under the name Radzyń Cultural Hall, and then, from 1994, as the Radzyń Cultural Center. It has operated under this name in the historic Orangery to this day.

Since 1974, the Orangery has hosted the Karol Lipiński Days, a prestigious event honoring the legacy of the renowned violinist and composer born in Radzyń Podlaski. This annual celebration features performances by esteemed musicians from Poland and abroad, transforming the historic venue into a focal point of cultural life in Radzyń Podlaski. As part of the Karol Lipiński Days, many outstanding musicians (such as Mirosław Ławrynowicz, Jarek Śmietana and Dorota Miśkiewicz) have performed on the Orangery stage. The event not only commemorates Lipiński's contributions to music but also reinforces the Orangery's status as a vibrant cultural hub.

Since 1996, the Orangery has been the venue for the National Meetings with Author's Song "Orangery" (Polish: Ogólnopolskie Spotkanie z Piosenką Autorską „Oranżeria"). This event has become a key gathering for young authors and composers who perform their original songs. Beyond being a competition, the event also features artistic workshops and performances by esteemed artists in the genre. Over the years, the Orangery has hosted notable performers such as Jacek Kaczmarski, Stanisław Sojka, Halina Frąckowiak and bands like Stare Dobre Małżeństwo and Raz Dwa Trzy.

In 1996 the Orangery Gallery was established in the basement of the Orangery building. Every year a dozen or so exhibitions are held there, mainly paintings, photography and sculpture.

From 2007 to 2019 the Orangery building was also the venue for the cyclical guitar workshops "Ro(c)kowisko", led by experienced and respected guitarists from all over the world. The workshops and accompanying guitar concerts attracted participants from all over Poland. During the thirteen editions of the event, many musicians performed on the Orangery stage, such as Jennifer Batten, Neil Zaza, as well as the bands Closterkeller, The Analogs, Farben Lehre.

== Appearance ==
The Orangery stands at the intersection of the main axis of the park and the street leading from the main road (currently Międzyrzecka Street). The building is designed in the shape of a T, with its side avant-corps adorned with vases and putti. Symmetrically placed on either side of the avant-corps are four porte-fenetre windows, each topped with arches and delicate rocaille motifs. These tall and wide windows were strategically positioned on the south side to maximize light and warmth for the plants inside.

The entablature is supported by prominent columns and Ionic pilasters, featuring carvings of Apollo's Chariot. Above the side avant-corps are sculptural groups of putti placing vases surrounded by flower garlands. The side walls of the façade feature single-axial pseudo-risals. The main entrance is located in the central avant-corps.

Adjacent to the Orangery on the north side is a building that served as a support facility for the Gardener's Cottage. This extension includes stairs leading to the gallery in the main section. The basement, constructed of brick and plastered, is barrel-vaulted. On the west side, there is a separate single-span vestibule. The building's transverse section features a two-bay layout with a corridor, although the interiors have been significantly altered.

The Orangery's design was inspired by the Bourbon Palace in France and resembles the Orangery in the park near Gross Sedlitz, near Dresden, Germany.

== Sculptures ==
The primary function of the Orangery is reflected in its sculptures, which depict Apollo's chariot, symbolizing the life-giving sun, and two groups of putti on the parapets of the pseudo-risalits. Above the central vault, amid the clouds, is a large sculpture of Apollo, representing the passage of the day. Apollo, draped in a flowing cloak, sits on a chariot (currently with a broken right wheel), drawn by three horses, originally holding the reins. At the edges of the composition are putti symbolizing Night and Day (or Twilight and Morning).

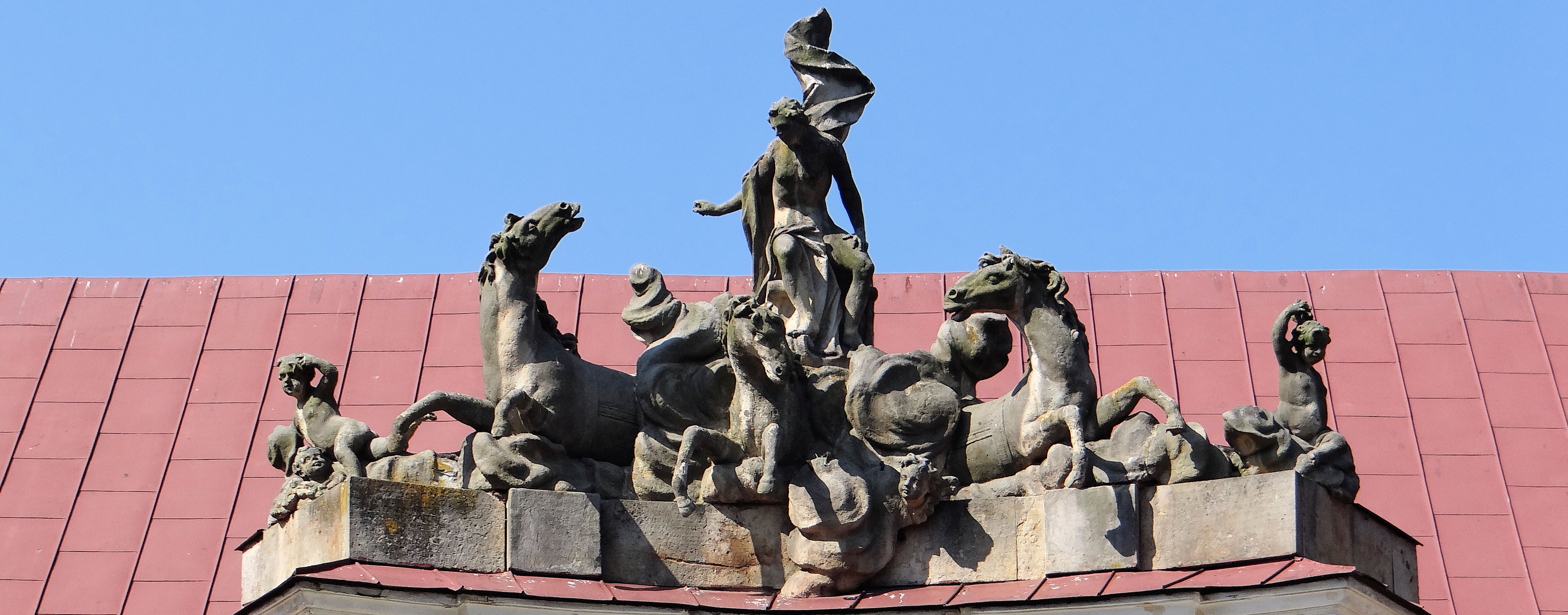
Apollo's Chariot Sculpture

Above the extreme avant-corps, on the sections of the attic, are two similarly composed figural groups featuring a trio of putti and a vase. In the western group, the central vase is held by a standing putto on a small pedestal decorated by a flower branch, featuring concave walls that transition into volutes. Flanking the vase, next to Rocaille cartouches, are two putti: on the left, likely a girl with a mis-reconstructed boy's head, holding a flower branch in her right hand and a cartouche with her left; on the right, a boy holding grape branches with both hands.

The eastern group features a tilted vase in the center, adorned with a flower branch, similar to the western pedestal, with a kneeling putto attached to it. Flanking the vase, next to Rocaille cartouches, are two putti pulling on ropes originally attached to a now-lost element, possibly a carved orange tree emerging from the vase. While the rope in the left putto's hands is missing, it is partially visible in the right putto's.

The putti above the western avant-corps likely represent the seasons: spring (leftmost), summer (middle), and autumn (rightmost). The putti above the eastern avant-corps are interpreted as a personification of Garden Works. Redler's sculptures decorating the Potocki residence in Radzyń Podlaski are unique on a European scale and are the most valuable element of the palace and park complex.

== See also ==
- Architecture of Poland
