= Urban Highline Festival Lublin =

Urban Highline Festival
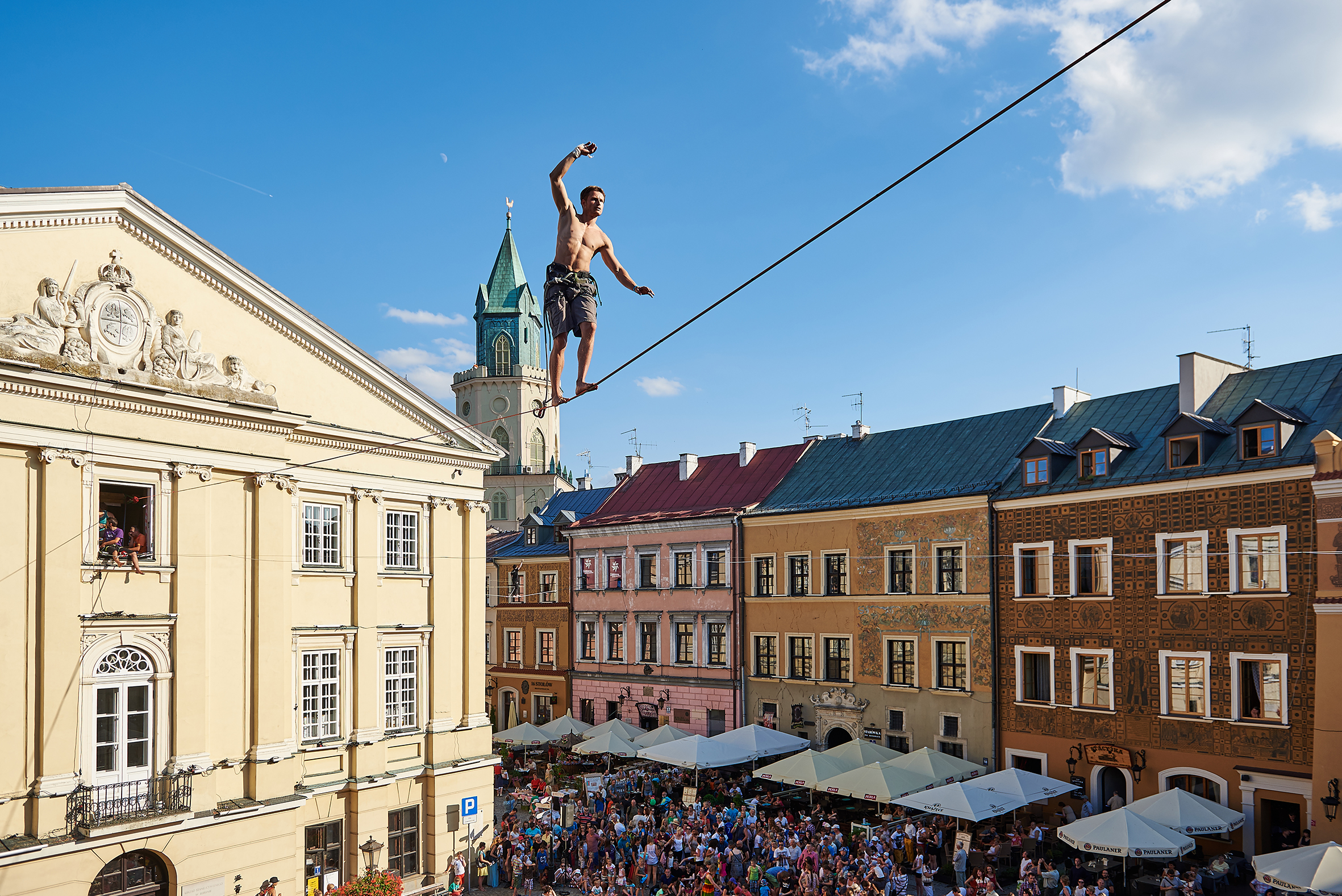
- Location: Lublin
- Founded: 2009
- Hosted by: City of Lublin
- Website: urbanhighline.pl

The Urban Highline Festival is a worldwide biggest urban highline event held annually in Lublin, Poland. The oldest and largest official rally of slackliners and highliners in Poland organised in last days of July in parallel to Carnaval Sztukmistrzów in Old Town of Lublin. The Urban Highline Festival 2019 had more than 300 highliners from all around the World. in 1996 Der Spiegel Raise mentioned Festival as one of the top 10 highline festivals in the world.
