= Szymonowicz =

Szymonowicz or Szymonowic is a Polish-language surname. It is a patronymic surname derived from the given name Szymon. Notable people with this surname include:

- Dawid Szymonowicz
- Szymon Szymonowic a.k.a. Simon Szymonowicz
- Jerzy Szymonowicz
