= Szymanek =

Szymanek is a Polish surname. It is a patronymic surname derived from the given name Szymon..Notable people with the surname include:

- Nik Szymanek, British amateur astronomer and astrophotographer
- Wojciech Szymanek (born 1982), Polish footballer
- Jolanta Szymanek-Deresz (1954–2010), Polish politician
- Stacy Szymaszek (born July 17, 1969), American poet, professor, and arts administrator
