= Kraków Gate (Lublin) =

City gate in Lublin, Poland

Coordinates: 51°14′51″N 22°33′59″E

Kraków Gate in Lublin
- Brama Krakowska w Lublinie
- Lublin, Poland
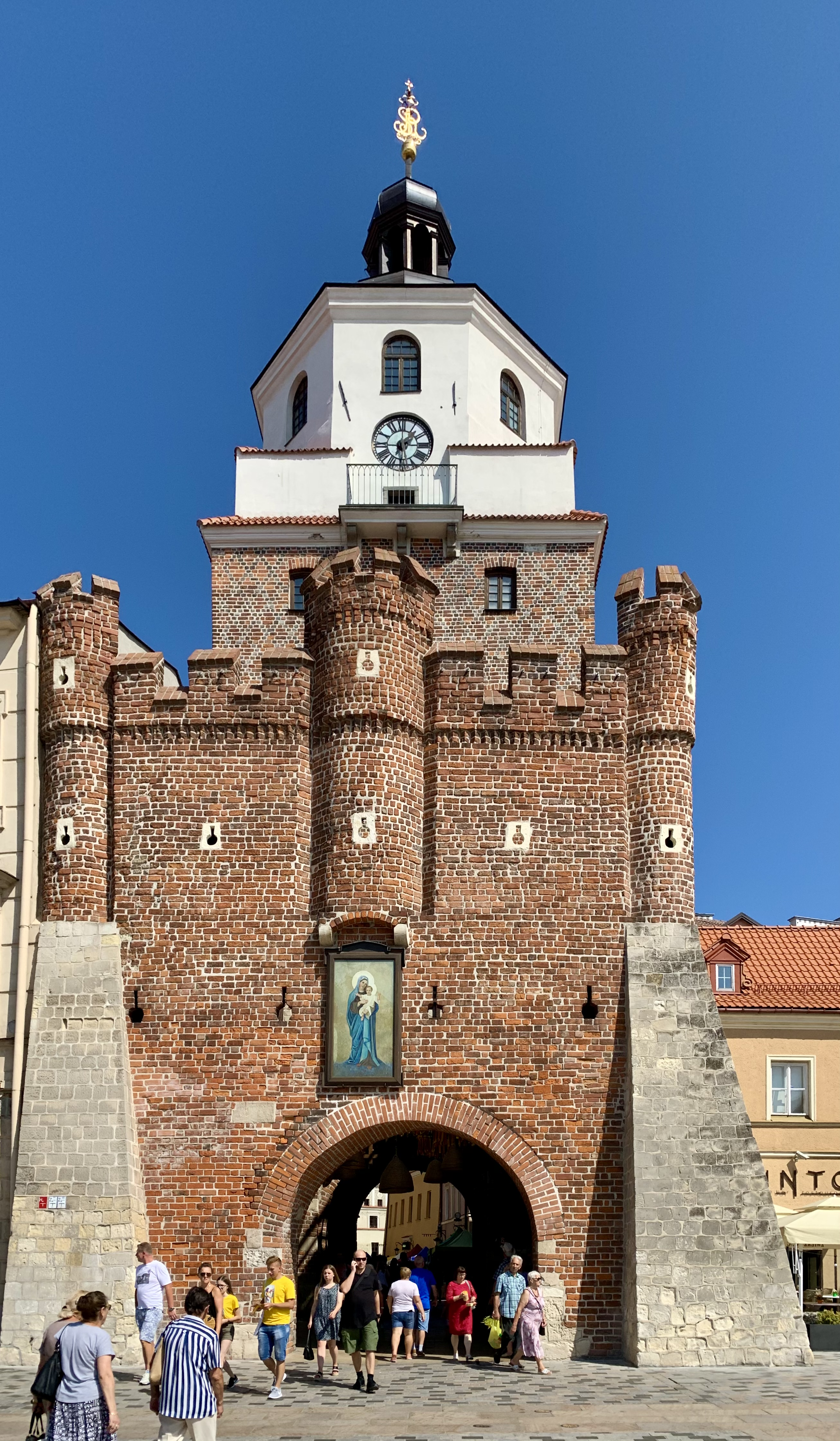

Site information
- Type: Wall

Location
- Height: 180 feet

Site history
- Built: 1342

Historic Monument of Poland
- Designated: 2007-04-25
- Part of: Lublin – historic architectural and urban ensemble
- Reference no.: Dz. U. z 2007 r. Nr 86, poz. 574

Kraków Gate is a Gothic city gate in Lublin, Poland. It was built in the 14th century, during the reign of King Casimir III the Great. It is a protected monument in Poland. The gate resides within the historic portion of Lublin, which is itself a historic monument of Poland.

The tower is one of the last remaining components of the original Lublin city walls. It provided access to routes leading to Kraków. It also features facilities for a trumpeter and a clock.

== History ==
In 1341, the city was attacked by Mongols.

According to historian Zygmunt Gloger, the tower was probably produced on the order and support of Casimir the Great in 1342. King Stanisław August renovated the structure in 1787. It was again renovated by the municipality in the 19th century. From 1845, the fire brigade used the structure.

In 1901, author Jadwiga Chrząszczewska described the building as "magnificent."

== Archaeology ==
In 2018, archaeological work at the site suggested that a medieval cemetery had existed nearby. Digging also uncovered a coin from the 11th century.

== See also ==
- Opatów Gate
- St. Florian's Gate
- Golden Gate (Gdańsk)
- Gothic architecture in modern Poland
