= Radzyń Podlaski =

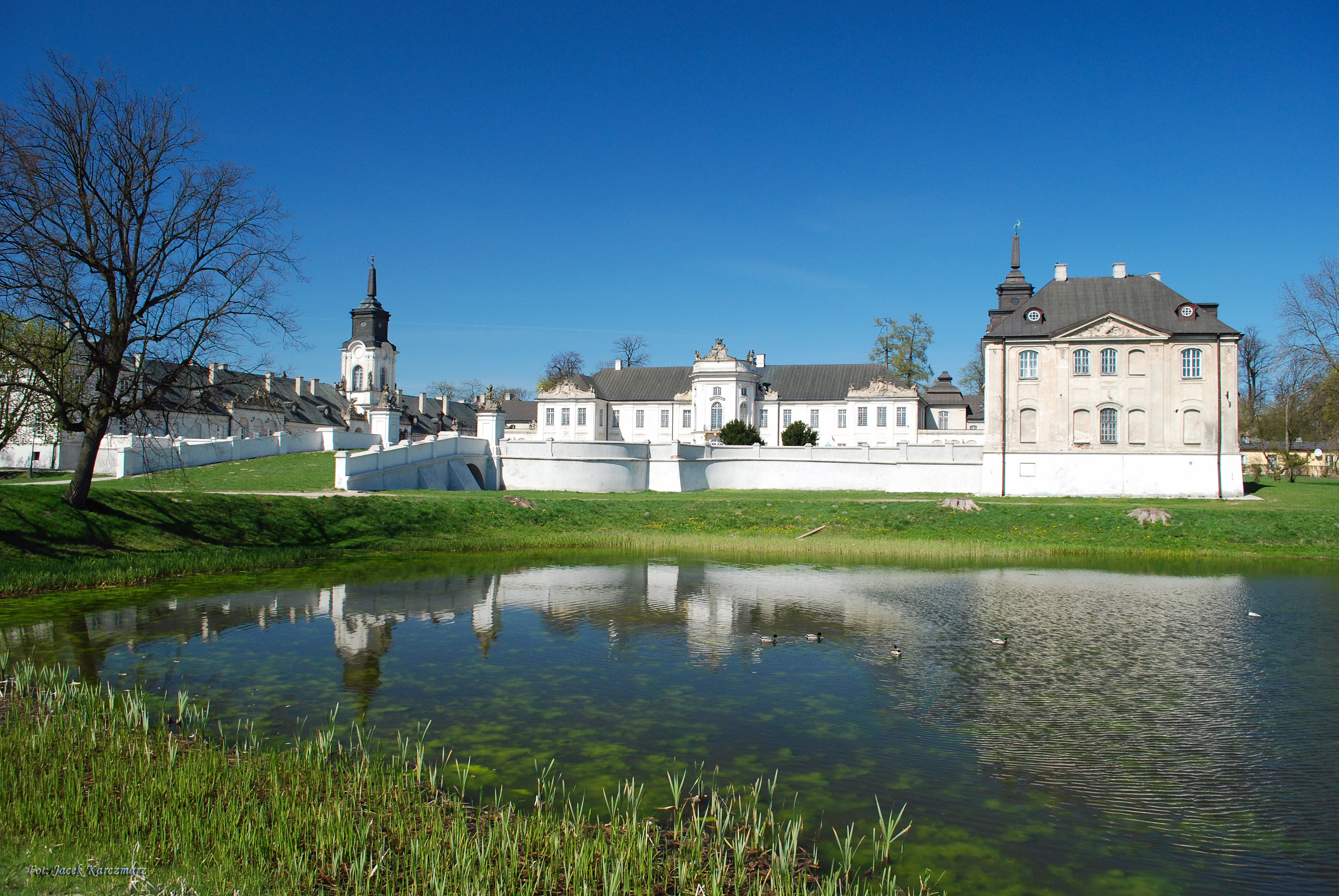
- Potocki Palace

- Coat of arms

- Location within Poland
- Coordinates: 51°46′58″N 22°37′27″E
- Country: Poland
- Voivodeship: Lublin Voivodeship
- County: Radzyń
- Gmina: Radzyń Podlaski (urban gmina)
- Town rights: 1468

Government
  - Mayor: Jakub Jakubowski (Ind.)

Area
  - Total: 19.31 km^{2} (7.46 sq mi)

Population (2017)
  - Total: 15,808
  - Density: 818.6/km^{2} (2,120/sq mi)
- Time zone: UTC+1 (CET)
  - Summer (DST): UTC+2 (CEST)
- Postal code: 21-300, 21-315
- Car plates: LRA
- Website: http://www.radzyn-podl.pl/

Radzyń Podlaski pronounced [ˈrad͡zɨɲ pɔdˈlaskʲi] is a town in eastern Poland, about 60 km (37 mi) north of Lublin, with 15,808 inhabitants (2017). The town has been part of the Lublin Voivodeship since 1999, previously it was part of the Biała Podlaska Voivodeship (1975–1998). It is the capital of Radzyń County, and historically belongs to the region of Lesser Poland (despite the adjective Podlaski, which suggests that it is part of another Polish province, Podlaskie). The town was founded in 1468, and its most important landmark is the rococo Potocki Palace.

Radzyń lies on the Białka River within the South Podlasie Lowland, at a height of 150 metres (490 ft) above sea level. The town has an area of 20.29 square kilometres (7.83 sq mi), of which forests make only 5%. It is located along the Expressway S19, which passes through Białystok, Lublin and Rzeszów.

== History ==
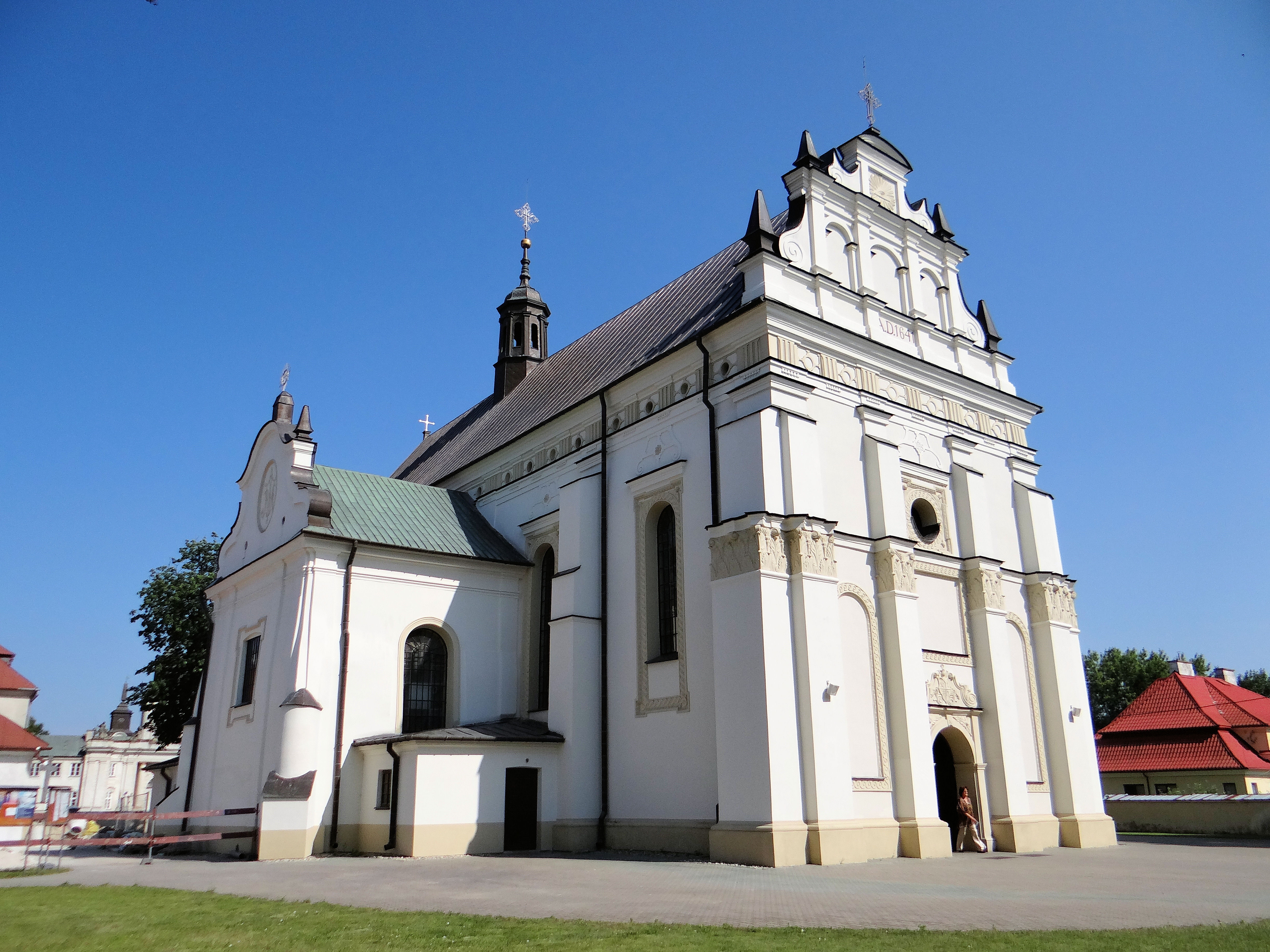
Lublin Renaissance Holy Trinity Church

In the early years of Polish statehood Radzyń was located in extreme northeastern corner of Lesser Poland, near the border with Podlachia, which often passed between Poland, Ruthenia and the Duchy of Lithuania. The region was frequently raided by its neighbors, which had a negative impact on the economy. This sparsely populated borderland of Lesser Poland began to see improvements after 1385, when Poland and Lithuania formed the Polish–Lithuanian union under the Union of Krewo. Settlers from other part of Lesser Poland, as well as Mazovia, came to Radzyń, churches were built and villages were founded. According to historical documents, the town of Radzyń was preceded by a settlement called Kozirynek (also spelled as Cozirynek and Kozyrynek; this name appears in documents as late as 1580).

In 1456, first Roman Catholic parish at Radzyń was created, and in 1468, the town was incorporated based on Magdeburg rights. It was a royal possession, leased by kings to different noblemen, such as the Mniszech family. In 1690, King John III Sobieski granted several privileges to town's residents. At that time, Radzyń had Roman Catholic, Greek-Catholic and Orthodox churches, as well as a synagogue. Radzyń was a private town, administratively located in the Lublin Voivodeship in the Lesser Poland Province of the Polish Crown. Since 1741 until the late 18th century, Radzyń belonged to the Potocki family. General Eustachy Potocki built a rococo palace here. His son Ignacy Potocki (1750–1809) was born here.

=== 19th century ===
Following the Partitions of Poland at the end of the 18th century, Radzyń was annexed by Austria, then following the Austro-Polish War, in 1809, it was liberated by Poles and included within the short-lived Duchy of Warsaw, and after its dissolution, in 1815 it became part of Russian-controlled Congress Poland. Many inhabitants participated in the large Polish uprisings of 1830–1831 and 1863–1864. In 1867 Russian authorities created Radzyń County, which gave the town a boost. Later on, Radzyń got a rail connection with Lublin and Siedlce, and the town began a period of development.

=== World War I ===
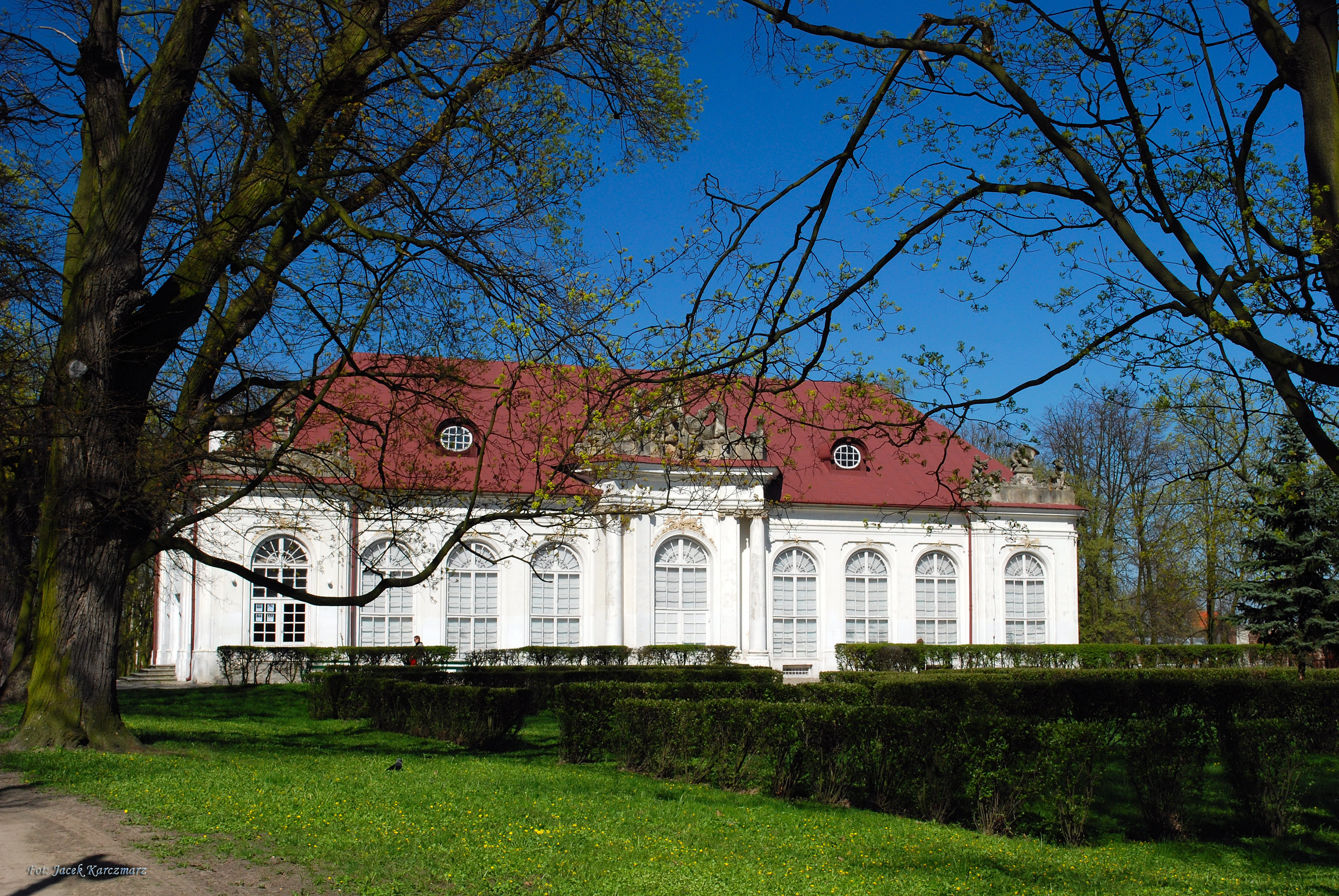
Baroque orangerie

During World War I, the town was occupied by Germany. In November 1918, Poland regained independence, and the occupying German forces opened fire on Poles who tried to liberate the town, but it was still reintegrated with the reborn Polish state. Within the Second Polish Republic, Radzyń was the seat of a county in Lublin Voivodeship. The town was briefly occupied by the Russians during the Polish–Soviet War in mid-August 1920, and recaptured by Poles on August 16, 1920. After a major fire in 1930, the houses on the market square, formerly from wood, were rebuilt of stone and brick.

=== World War II ===
During the joint German-Soviet invasion of Poland, which started World War II, on September 9, 1939, Radzyń was bombed by the Luftwaffe. In late September of that year, it was one of centers of Polish resistance, with units of Independent Operational Group Polesie stationed there for some time. The first Germans appeared in Radzyń after the Battle of Kock, in early October 1939.

In June 1940, during the AB-Aktion, the Germans carried out mass arrests of Poles, many of whom were afterwards imprisoned in the Lublin Castle and deported to concentration camps. The pacification actions were conducted by the Nazi German Reserve Police Battalion 101. The town was a major center of Home Army, with 4,200 members, and the German occupation lasted until July 23, 1944, when the Red Army entered the town. The Jewish community was never reconstituted.

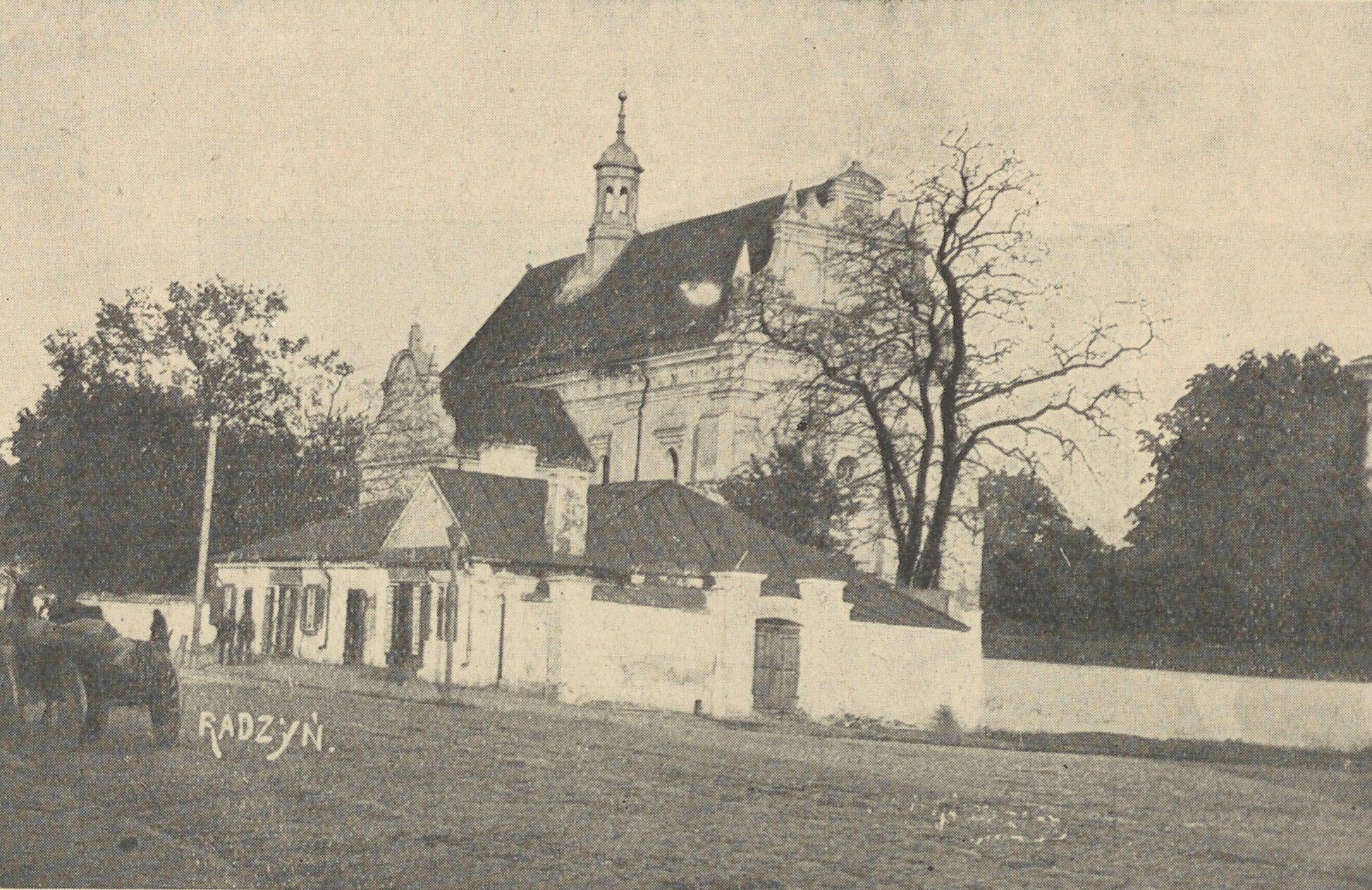
Church in Radzyń, before 1930

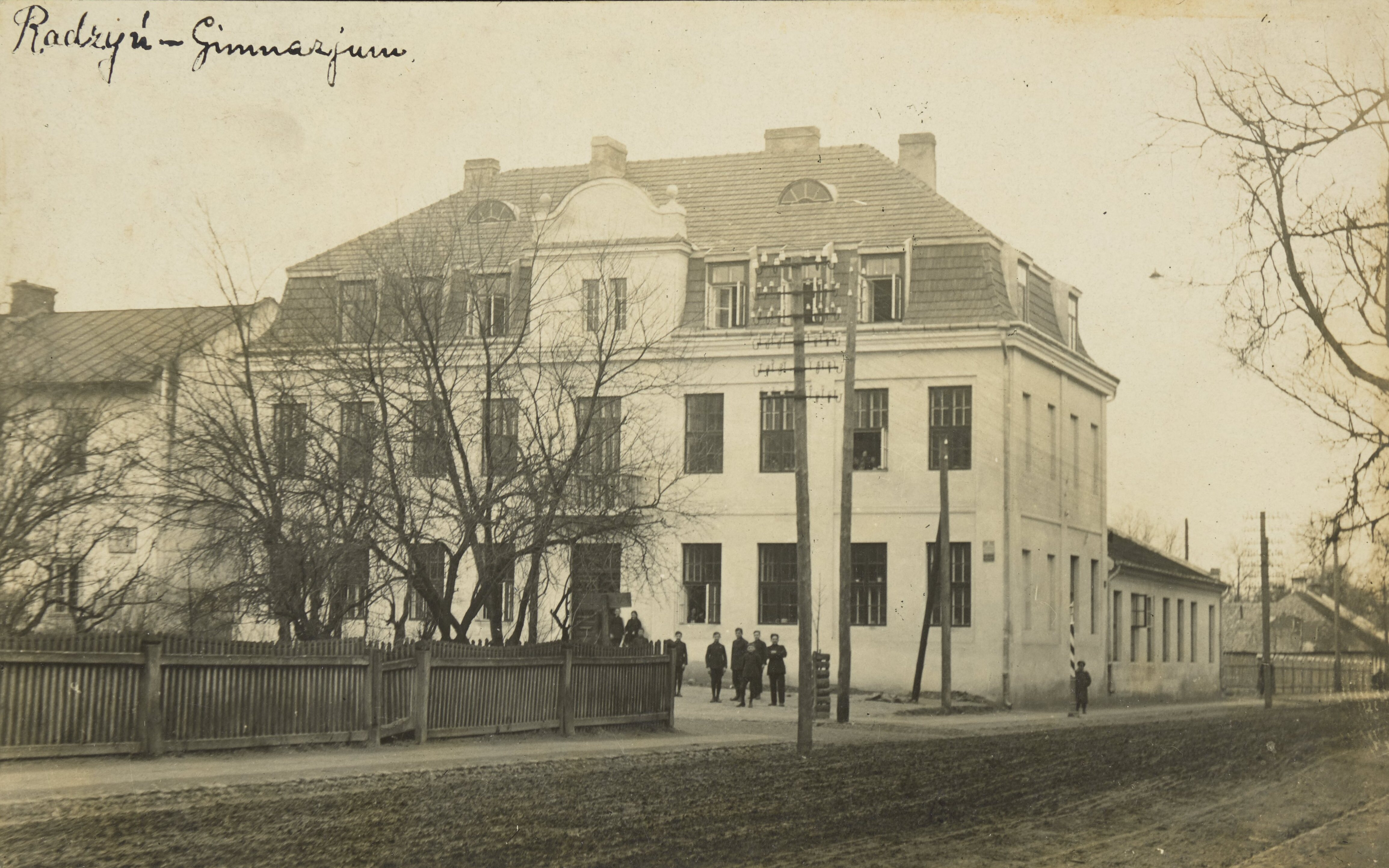
School, post 1906

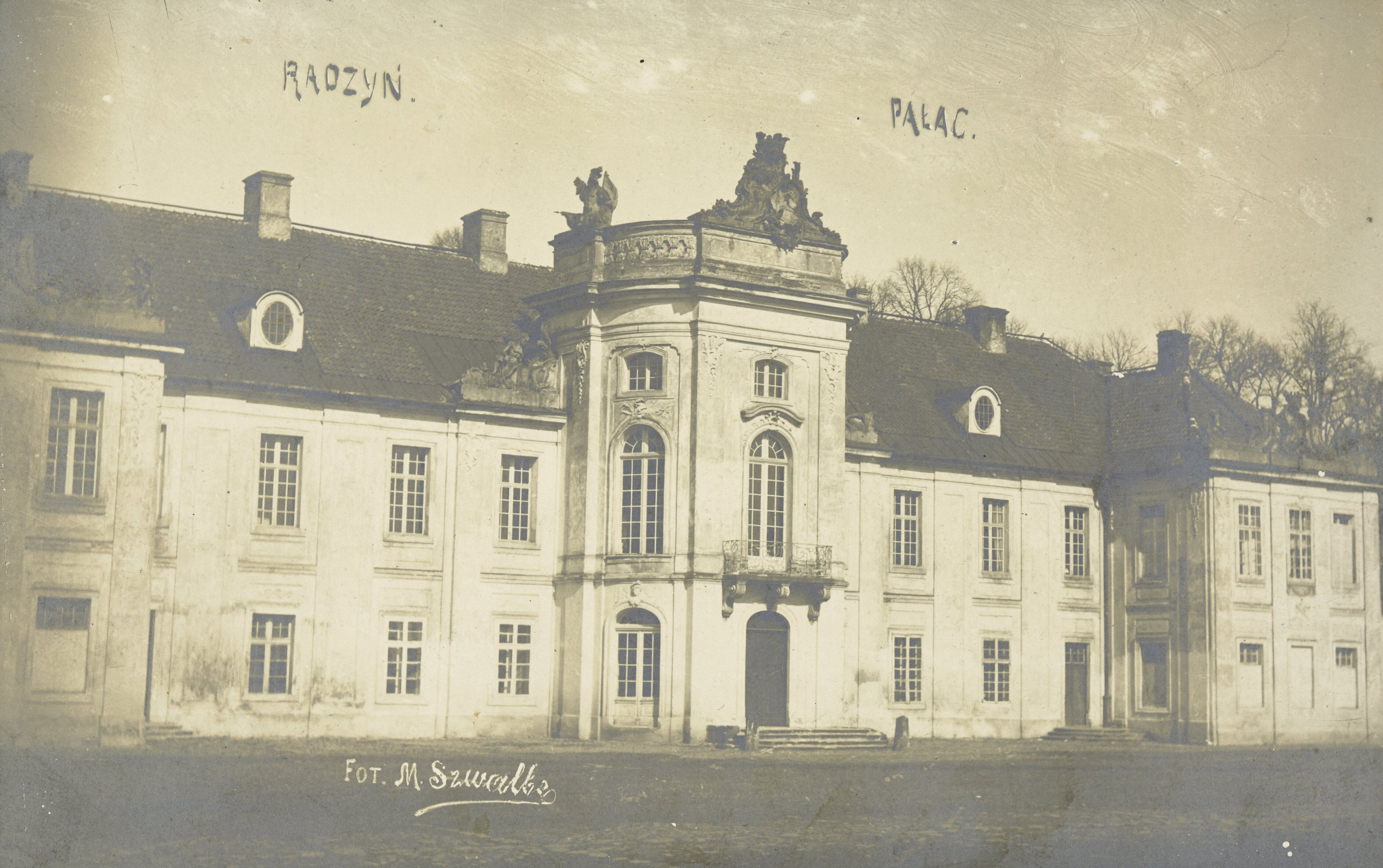
Palace, post 1906

== Jewish community ==
Jews settled in Radzyn Podlaski in the 16th century. In the 19th century, it became known as an important center of Jewish learning. The town had a Jewish population of 2,900 before World War II. It was home to the Radzyn Hasidic dynasty.

=== The Holocaust ===
After the Germans entered the town, which they had bombed from the air, they began abusing its Jewish inhabitants. Orthodox Jews were forced to dance in the rain with torn Torah scrolls. Jews were subjected to humiliating forced labour and abuse, and ransom payments were imposed on the community. In December 1939, Jews expelled from Lubartów arrived in the town. Later that month, most of the town's Jews were temporarily expelled to nearby Sławatycze. By the time they returned, all Jewish property in the town had been confiscated.

In July 1940, approximately 300 Jews from the town were taken to labour camps. The Jews remaining in the town were concentrated in a ghetto. In January 1941, the Germans murdered Jewish hostages after demanding that the local Judenrat hand over furs. In May 1942, the ghetto held 2,071 Jews.

A Jewish underground established by Zionist youth movements operated in the ghetto and organised escape to the forests. Rabbi Shmuel Shlomo Leiner, founder of the town's Sod Yesharim yeshiva, supported escape and resistance, and called on his Hasidim to join. He was murdered by the Germans in Włodawa in 1942. The poet Itzhak Katzenelson commemorated him in the Yiddish poem "Dos lid vegn Radziner" ("The Song about the Rebbe of Radzyń").

On 22 September 1942, members of the Gestapo executed approximately 200 Jews from the ghetto. According to Yad Vashem, the ghetto was liquidated between the beginning of October and 16 October 1942, when SS personnel and German and Polish police deported its 1,800–2,000 inhabitants to the Treblinka extermination camp via the Międzyrzec Podlaski Ghetto. Approximately 1,000 of the deportees had tried to hide before deportation but were caught. Owing to overcrowding in the freight cars, many Jews died before reaching the extermination camp. Many of those who jumped from the trains were handed over to the Germans by local Poles. After the deportation, Radzyń was declared Judenrein ("free of Jews").

Several dozen Jews who escaped from the ghetto formed a partisan group operating in the surrounding area, led by Yitzhak Kleinman.

== Sport ==
- Orlęta Radzyń Podlaski - football club

== Landmarks ==
Among the local points of interest are the St. Trinity Church (1641), built in the so-called Lublin Renaissance style, as well as the Potocki Palace (1740s), built by a Polish-Italian architect Jakub Fontana. Its interior was destroyed twice: in 1915 by Imperial Russian troops, and in 1944 by the Wehrmacht during the occupation of Poland in World War II. The palace was in 1920 the headquarters of General Edward Rydz-Śmigły, during the Battle of Warsaw. Since 1920, it has served as office of local administration.

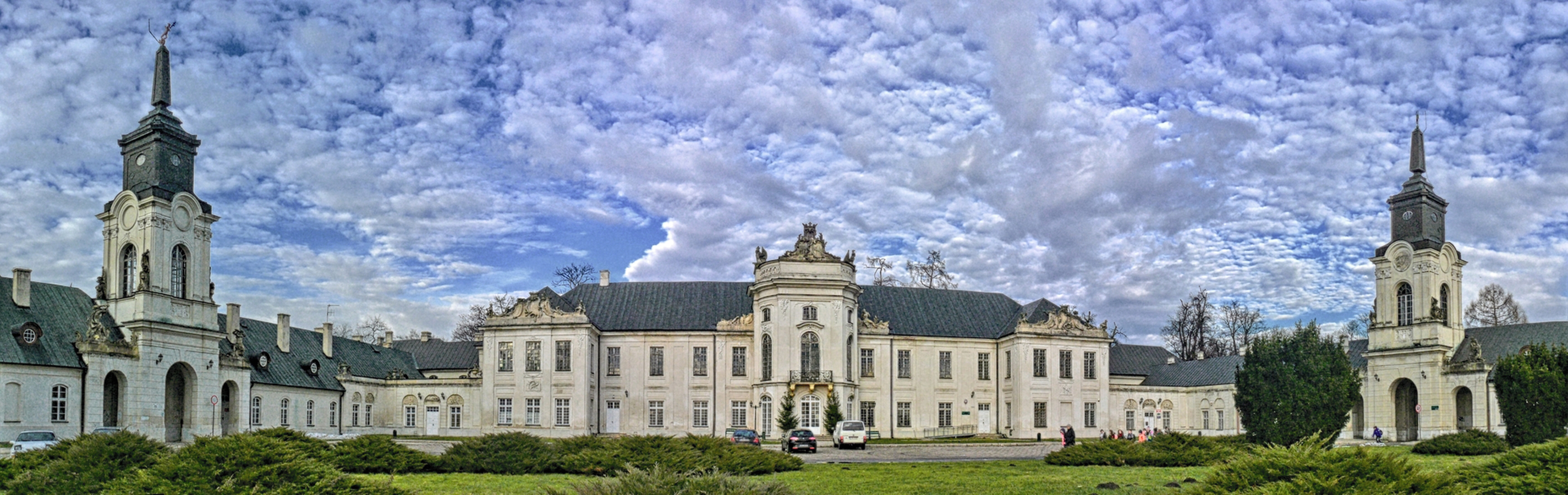
Potocki Palace built in 1750–59 (rebuilt in 1685–1709 in Rococo style), front entrance

== Notable residents ==
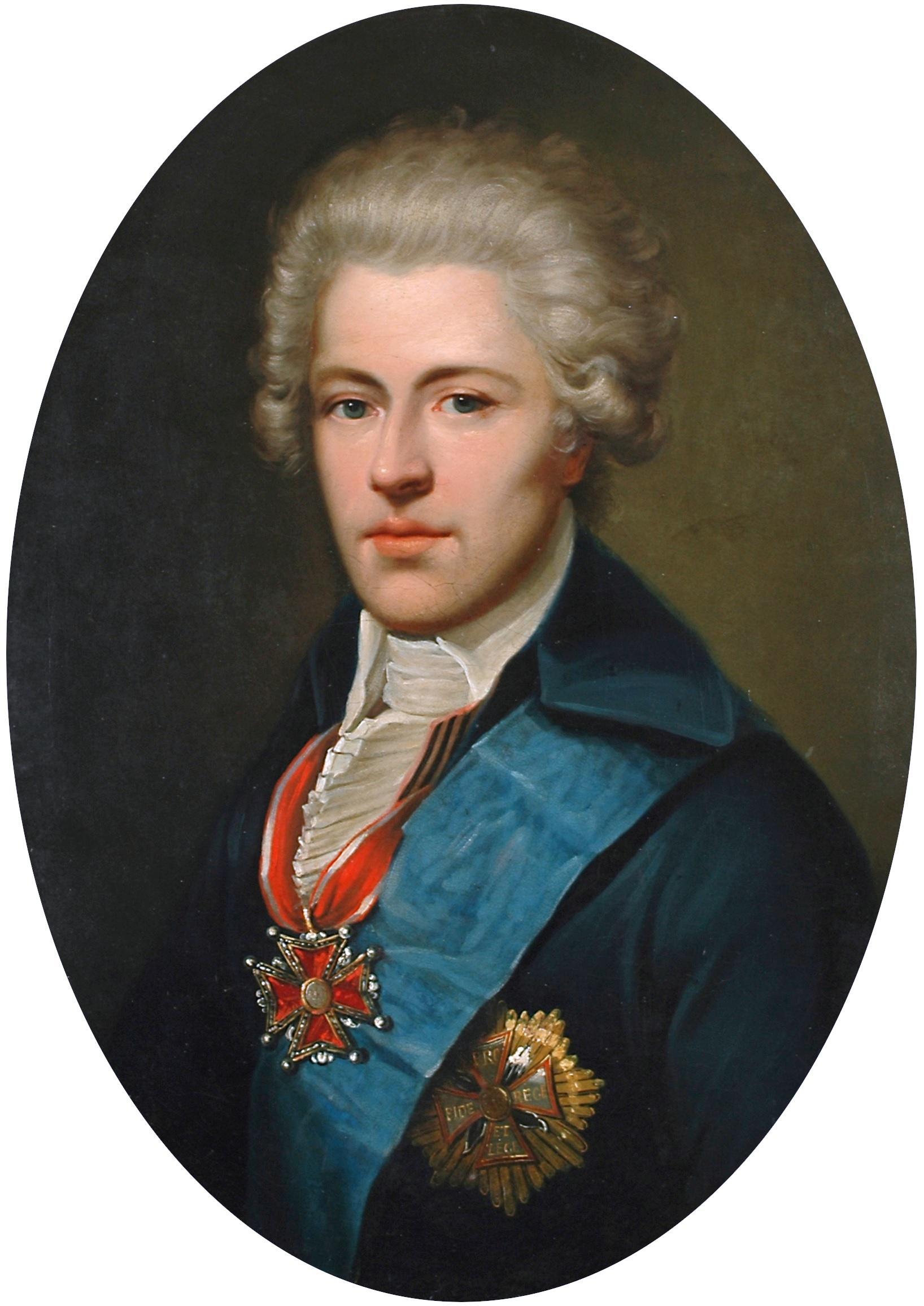
portrait of Ignacy Potocki from 1783/84

- Szymon Buchbinder (1853– ca.1908) a Polish painter of genre and historical scenes
- Zofia Grabczan (born 1962) a Polish politician was elected to the Sejm in 2005
- Max Helfman (1901-1963) a Polish-American Jewish composer and choral conductor; emigrated in 1909
- Dariusz Kowaluk (born 1996) a Polish 400m. sprinter, team gold medallist at the 2020 Summer Olympics
- Gershon Henoch Leiner (1839–1890) a rebbe of the Izhbitza-Radzin dynasty
- Shmuel Shlomo Leiner (1909–1942) the fifth Rebbe of the Izhbitza-Radzin dynasty
- Karol Lipiński (1790–1861) a Polish music composer and virtuoso violinist
- Ignacy Potocki (1750–1809) a Polish nobleman, a politician and writer.
- Eustachy Erazm Sanguszko (1768–1844) a Polish nobleman, general, military commander, diplomat and politician.
