= Zofia Grabczan =

Polish politician (born 1962)

member of Sejm 2005-2007
- In office 25 September 2005 – 2007

Personal details
- Born: 28 May 1962 (age 64)
- Party: Samoobrona

Zofia Anna Grabczan, née Walczyna (born 28 May 1962 in Radzyń Podlaski) is a Polish politician. She was elected to Sejm on 25 September 2005, getting 5971 votes in 7 Chełm district as a candidate from Samoobrona Rzeczpospolitej Polskiej list.

== See also ==
- Members of Polish Sejm 2005-2007
