= St. Joseph's Church, Lublin =

17th-century Roman Catholic church in Lublin, Poland

Coordinates: 51.2494°N 22.5654°E

St. Joseph's Church in Lublin
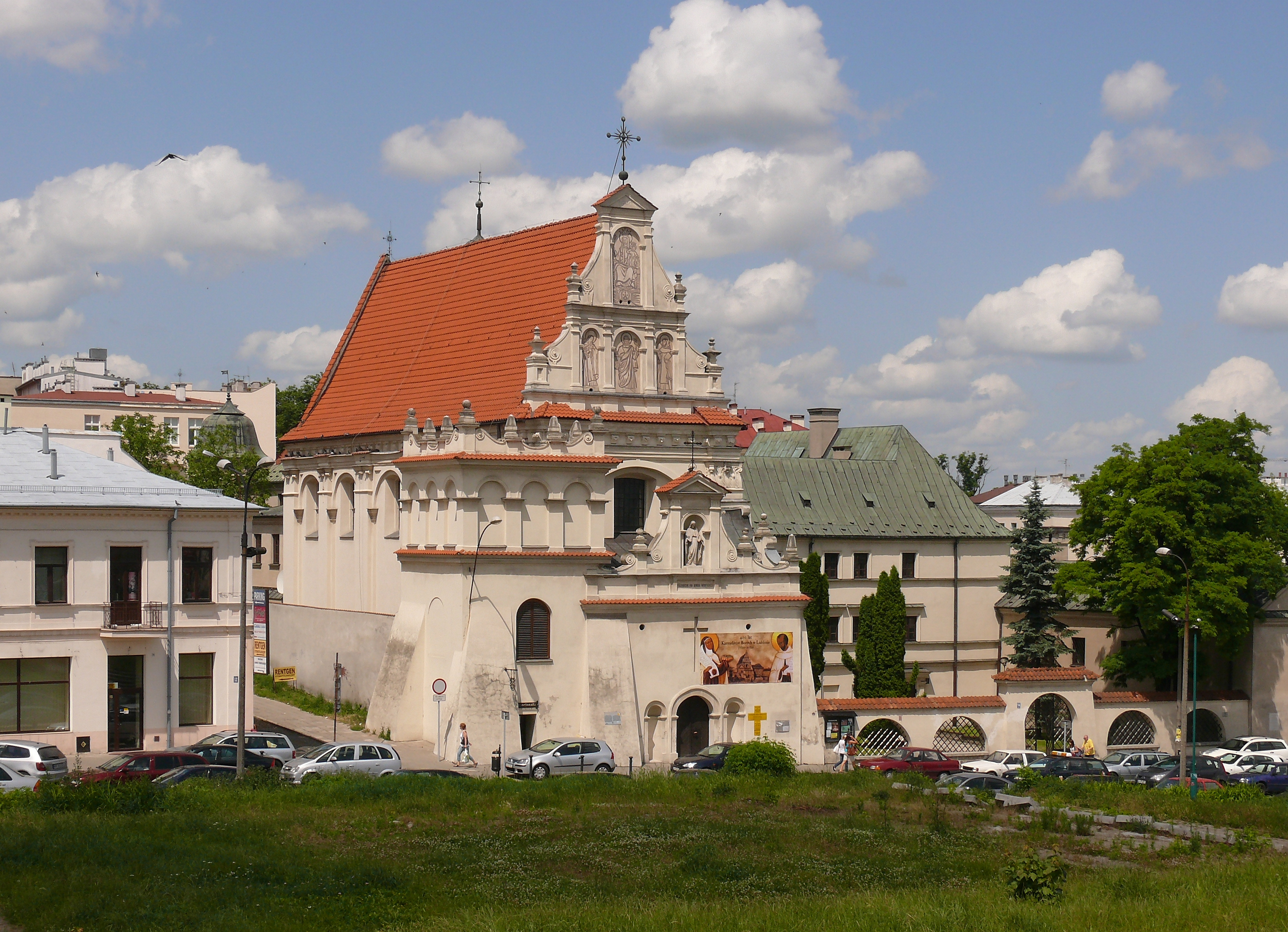

Religion
- Affiliation: Roman Catholicism
- Status: active church

Location
- Location: Lublin, Poland
- Interactive map of St. Joseph's Church in Lublin

Architecture
- Type: Lublin Renaissance
- Groundbreaking: 1635
- Completed: 1644

St. Joseph's Church is a 17th-century Roman Catholic church in Lublin. The building's construction was founded by Katarzyna from Kretków Sanguszkowa. Her portrait is displayed inside the church. The church was built between 1635 and 1644. The building has the Lublin Renaissance architectural style. The building's façade has two figures, St. Teresa of Ávila's and St. John of the Cross. The church has a nave with a chancel. The church, together with the abbey, was raised by the Carmelites.
