= Radzyń Podlaski Castle =

Radzyń Podlaski Castle and Palace-Park Complex
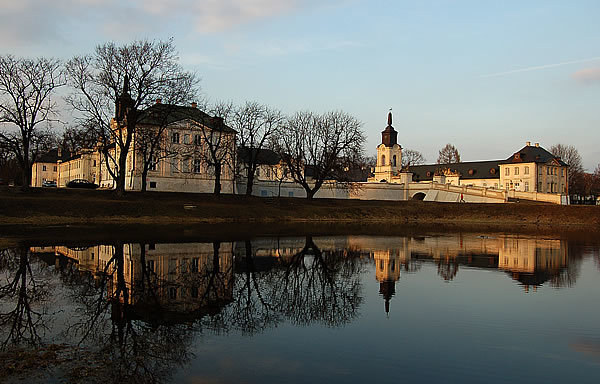
- Radzyń Podlaski Castle and Palace-Park Complex

- Location of the Radzyń Podlaski Castle and Palace-Park Complex in Poland Radzyń Podlaski Castle (Lublin Voivodeship)
- 51°46′56″N 22°37′20″E
- Location: Radzyń Podlaski, Lublin Voivodeship, in Poland

History
- Built: 1685-1709

Site notes
- Architectural styles: Gothic, Rococo

Radzyń Podlaski Castle is a complex of a palace and castle built between 1685 and 1709, and expanded between 1750 and 1759.

== History ==
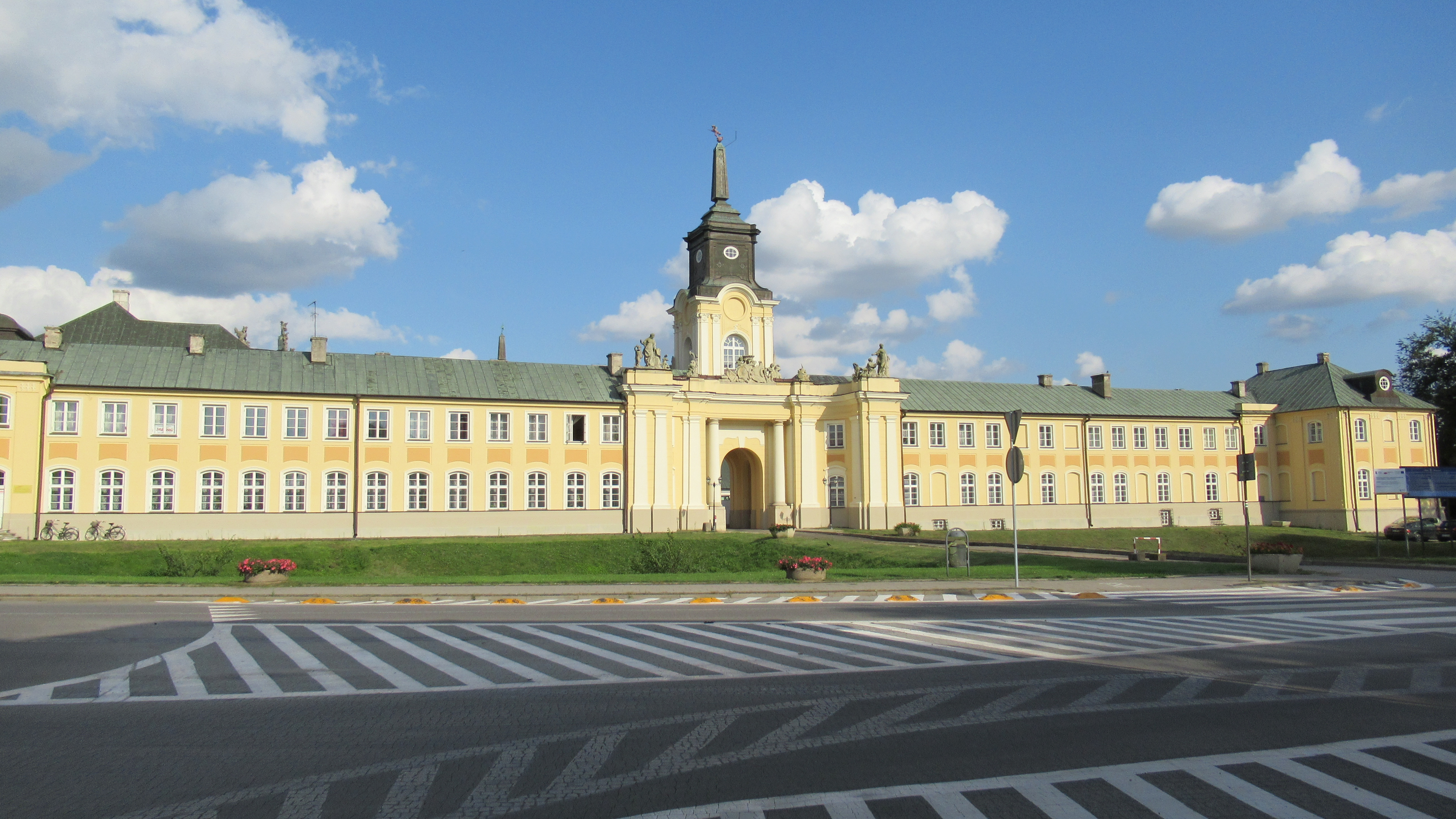
Western facade of the palace

The first building in Radzyń Podlaski ties with the new owner Stanisław Antoni Szczuka (died in 1710). In 1685, works on the complex began by John III Sobieski, which commissioned the works to the architect Augustyn Wincenty Locci. The complex was built from 1685 to 1709, in the location of a fifteenth century Baroque castle of the Kaznowski's Suchekomnaty Coat of Arms; the complex was built to function as a residence and defensive stronghold. Jakub Fontana became the main architect of the complex, who also carried out the expansion of the complex between 1750 and 1759, for Eustachy Potocki of the Piława Coat of Arms.

== See also ==
- Castles in Poland
