= Szymon =

Szymon is a Polish version of the masculine given name Simon.

== Academics ==
- Szymon Askenazy – historian and diplomat who served as the first Polish representative at the League of Nations
- Szymon Datner – Polish-Jewish historian and anti-Nazi partisan fighter

== Artists ==
- Szymon Bobrowski – actor
- Szymon Buchbinder – 19th and early 20th century Polish painter
- Szymon Czechowicz – 18th-century Polish painter
- Szymon Goldberg – Polish-American violinist and conductor
- Szymon Szymonowic – Polish Renaissance poet
- Szymon Josiah Borzestowski – Australian musician

== Athletes ==
- Szymon Matuszek – Polish footballer (midfielder)
- Szymon Piątkowski – Polish taekwondo practitioner
- Szymon Szewczyk – Polish professional basketball player
- Szymon Ziółkowski – Olympic gold medal-winning hammer thrower

== Nobility ==
- Szymon Marcin Kossakowski – 18th-century Polish Lithuanian nobleman and a leader of the Targowica Confederation
- Szymon Samuel Sanguszko – 17th-century nobleman of the Polish–Lithuanian Commonwealth
- Szymon Starowolski – 17th-century Lithuanian writer and scholar
- Szymon Bogumił Zug – 18th-century Polish nobleman and architect
- Szymon Madej – 16th-century Polish councilor and scholar

== Politicians ==
- Szymon Hołownia – Marshal of the Sejm, leader of Polska 2050 political party
- Szymon Konarski – 19th-century Polish democrat and revolutionary
- Szymon Stanisław Giżyński – member of Poland's lower house of parliament (the Sejm) from Law and Justice
- Szymon Pawłowski – member of Poland's lower house of parliament (the Sejm) from League of Polish Families
- Szymon Perski – the birth name of former Israeli Prime Minister Shimon Peres
- Szymon Niemiec – vice president of Polish party Union of the Left, gay activist and founder of first Polish Gay Pride parade

== Others ==
- Szymon Majewski – journalist, showman, presenter, television personality
- Szymon Marciniak – professional football referee, named "The World's Best Referee" by the International Federation of Football History & Statistics (IFFHS) in 2023
- Szymon Winawer – chess player
