= Szymon Buchbinder =

Polish painter

- Born: 6 January 1853; Radzyń Podlaski
- Died: 21 October 1922 (aged 69); Berlin
- Education: Warsaw School of Drawing; Vienna Academy of Fine Arts; Kraków Academy of Fine Arts
- Known for: Genre and historical scenes, portraits
- Notable work: "The Praying Jew", "The Astronomer", "Chess Game"
- Style: Genre painting, historical painting, Portraiture

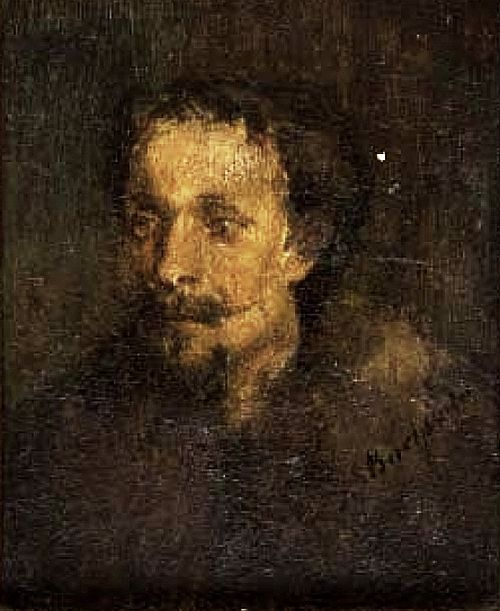
Self-portrait (date unknown)

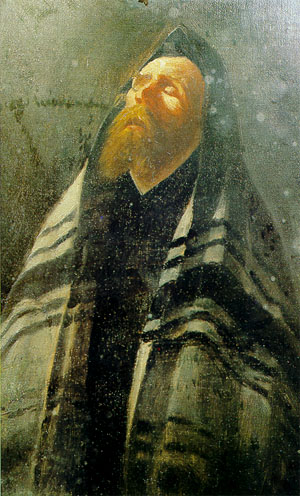
Rabbi Praying

Szymon Buchbinder, or Simeon Buchbinder (6 January 1853 – 21 October 1922) was a Polish painter. Most of his works were genre and historical scenes (often with a moral) and portraits done in small formats.

== Biography ==
He was born in Radzyń Podlaski and received his first lessons from his half-brother, Józef, an established artist who was his senior by fourteen years. Later, he took lessons with two local painters; a portraitist named Heymann and a theatrical artist named Malinowski.

From 1869 to 1871, he attended the "Warsaw School of Drawing", where he studied with Wojciech Gerson and Rafał Hadziewicz. After graduating, he was able to find a position as a designer at the Vienna State Opera. Two years later, he enrolled at the Vienna Academy of Fine Arts, under the direction of Eduard von Engerth. He was there until 1878.

The following year, he moved to Kraków where he obtained a position in the studios of Jan Matejko at the Academy of Fine Arts. Later, Matejko would refer to him as a "painter of great hope". In 1883, a scholarship enabled him to study in Munich, where he remained for many years.

In 1897, he moved to Berlin and concentrated on doing portraits. He apparently died there around 1908, although he may have lived until as late as 1924. He seldom exhibited; notably with the Kraków Society of Friends of Fine Arts during his stay there and at an exhibition of German painters at the Grafton Galleries in 1906.
