= Lublin Old Town =

Historic area of Lublin, Poland

Old Town Stare Miasto
- Part of Lublin
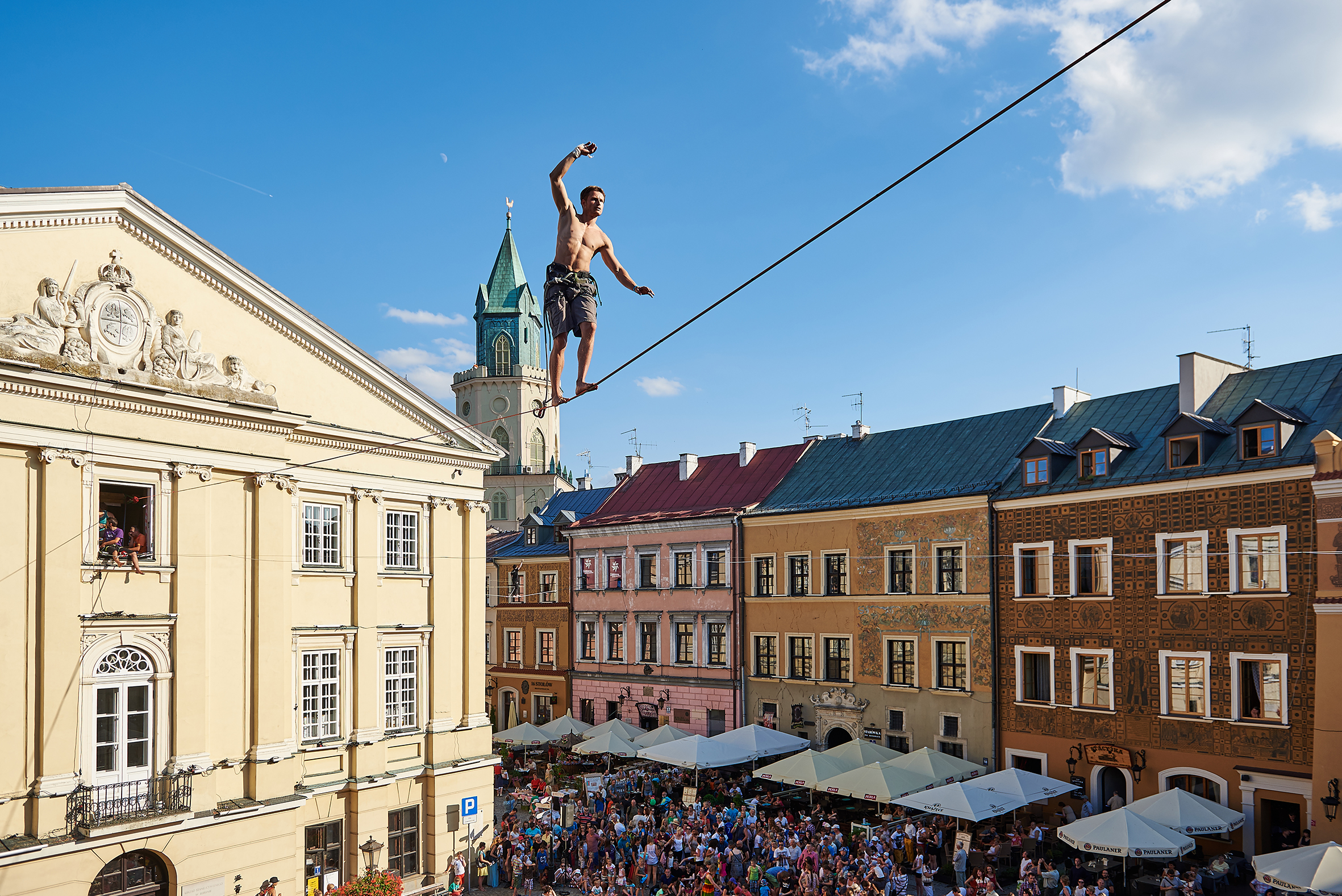

- Location within Poland Location within Lublin Voivodeship
- Coordinates: 51°14′24″N 22°34′12″E
- Country: Poland
- Voivodeship: Lublin
- County/City: Lublin
- Time zone: UTC+1 (CET)
  - Summer (DST): UTC+2 (CEST)
- Vehicle registration: LU

Historic Monument of Poland
- Designated: 2007-04-25
- Part of: Lublin – historic architectural and urban ensemble
- Reference no.: Dz. U. z 2007 r. Nr 86, poz. 574

Lublin Old Town is the historic town center of Lublin, Poland, one of the most significant Polish complexes of historic buildings. The Crown Tribunal and the 14th-century Kraków Gate, leading from the Old Town to the city center, are commonly considered symbols of the city.

The district is one of Poland's official national Historic Monuments (Pomnik historii), as designated May 16, 2007, and tracked by the National Heritage Board of Poland.

== Interesting sites and building ==
The Krakowska Gate is an entry gate to the old town with remains of defensive fortifications from the 14th century. The gate is built in a gothic style and has some baroque elements added in the 18th century.

== Gallery ==
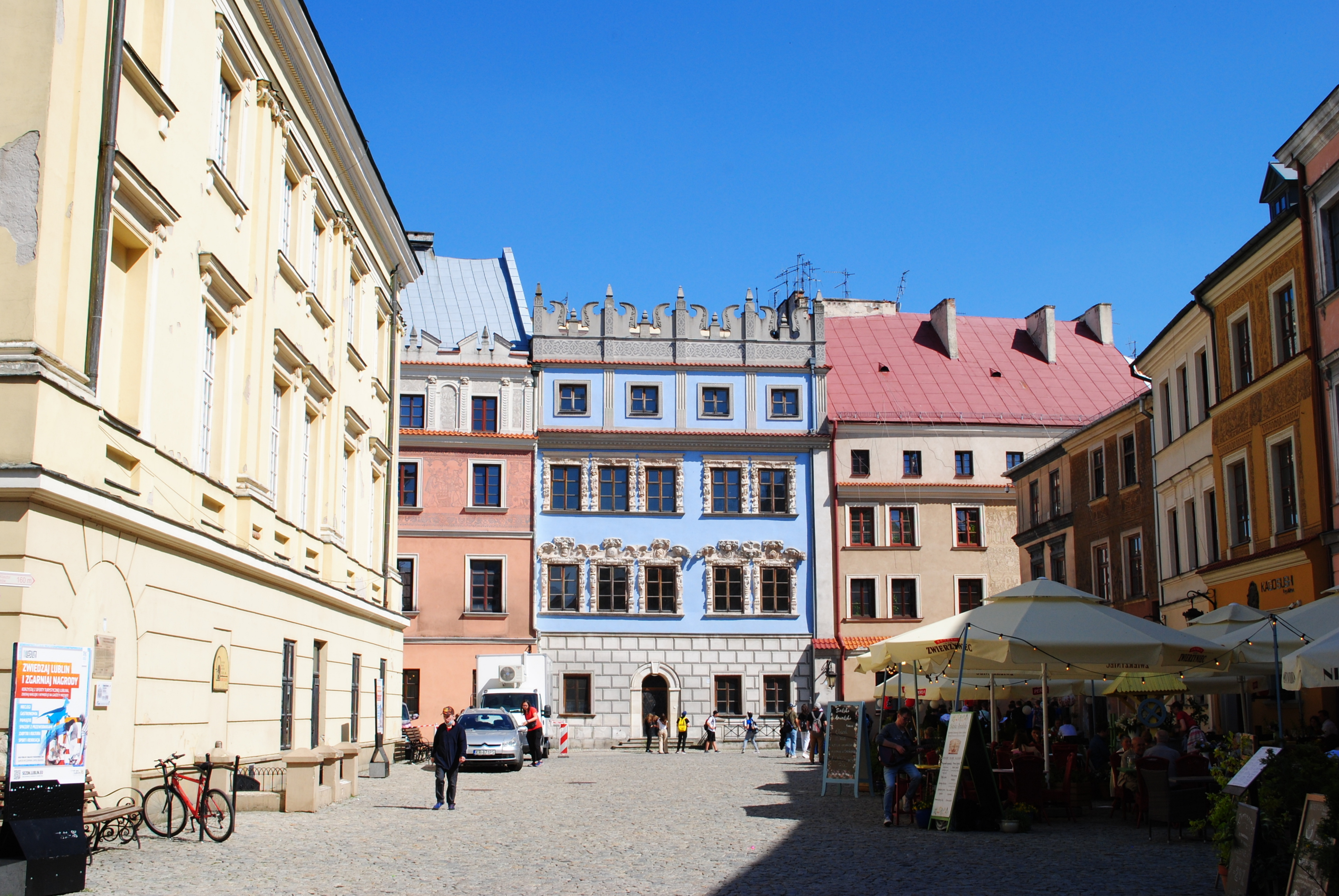
Market Square

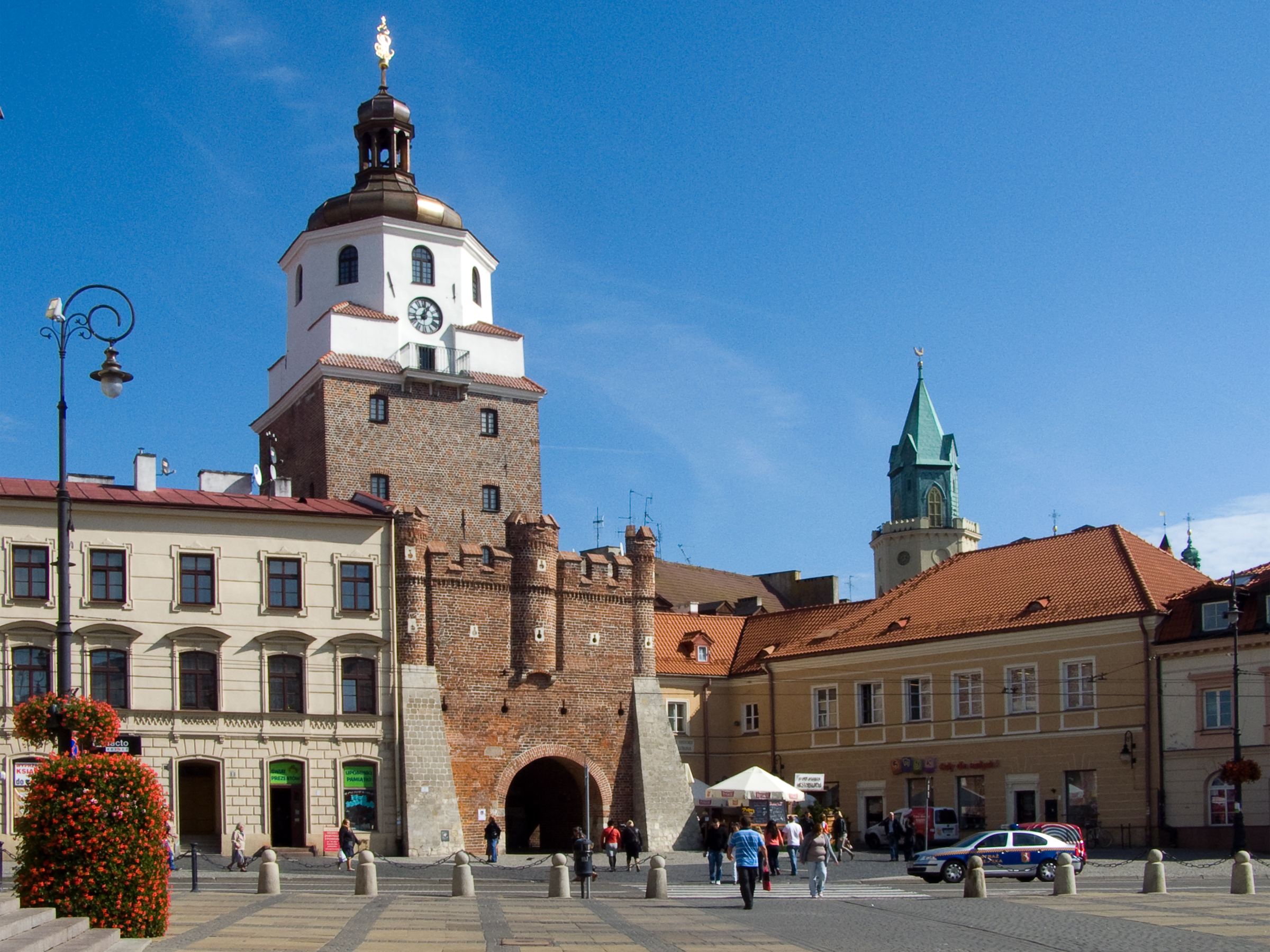
Kraków Gate

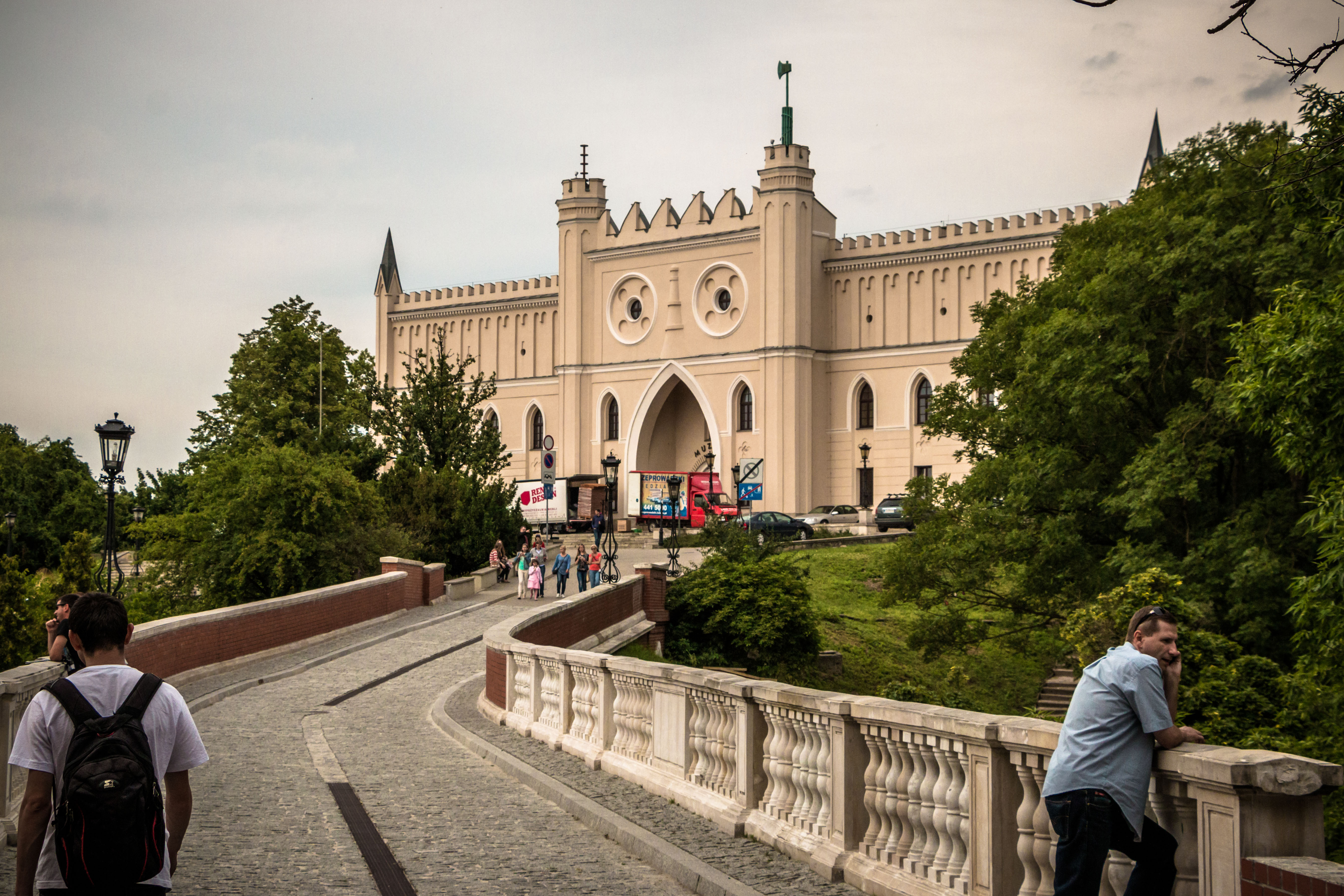
Lublin Castle

== See also ==
- The Lublin Renaissance
