= Lublin Renaissance =

Late 16th century architecture, Lubin Poland

The Lublin Renaissance was an architectural style developed in the Lublin region of Poland at the end of the 16th century.

== History ==
The Lublin region has a fine architectural heritage. It was at the end of the 16th century that the first fully developed forms of Renaissance architecture were imported into the Lublin region. The beginning of the next century saw an enormous increase in the number of fine religious buildings developed as a result of the great wealth created by the Lublin region being one of the most important exporters of grain to Western Europe. The majority of churches were erected by architects of Italian origin who in this way created a local style known as the Lublin Renaissance. Churches built in this style are aisleless with a bigger presbytery than is usual, which ends in a semicircle, as well as having a barrel vault. Their distinctive features are richly ornamented gables and stucco decoration of the interior. The Lublin Renaissance is best represented by the churches in Lublin, Końskowola and Kazimierz Dolny.

Visitors will also be entranced by the rich ornamentation of the Renaissance house fronts, especially the high attics of the houses in a number of the region's towns and villages. The best examples of these are the Przybyłów and Celejowska houses also in Kazimierz Dolny.

== Gallery ==
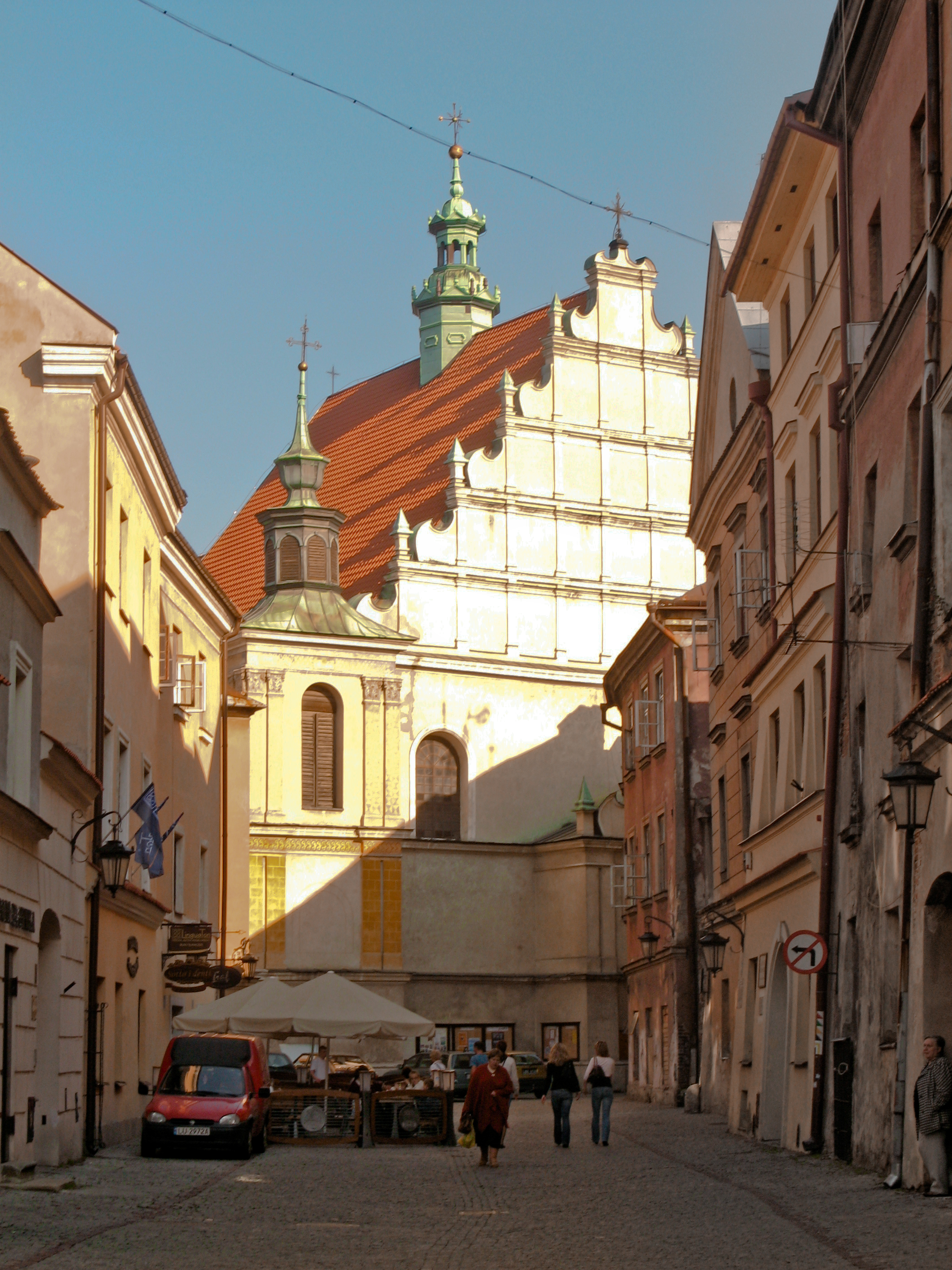
Basilica of the Dominican Friars in Lublin Old Town.

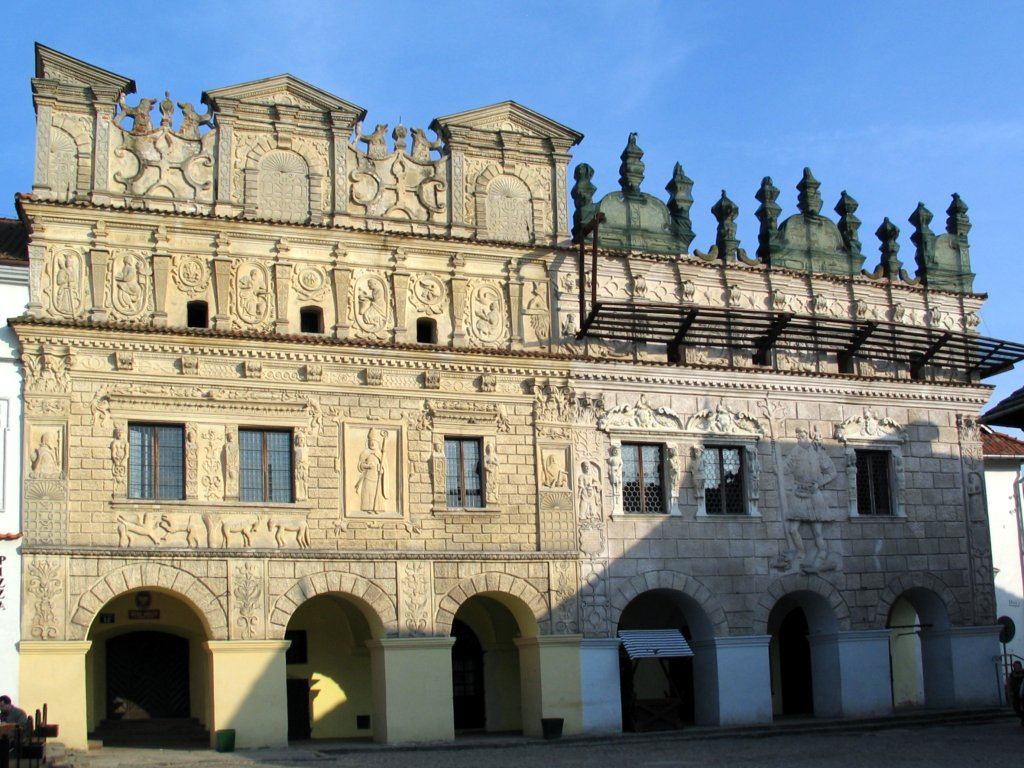
Tenement houses in Kazimierz Dolny.

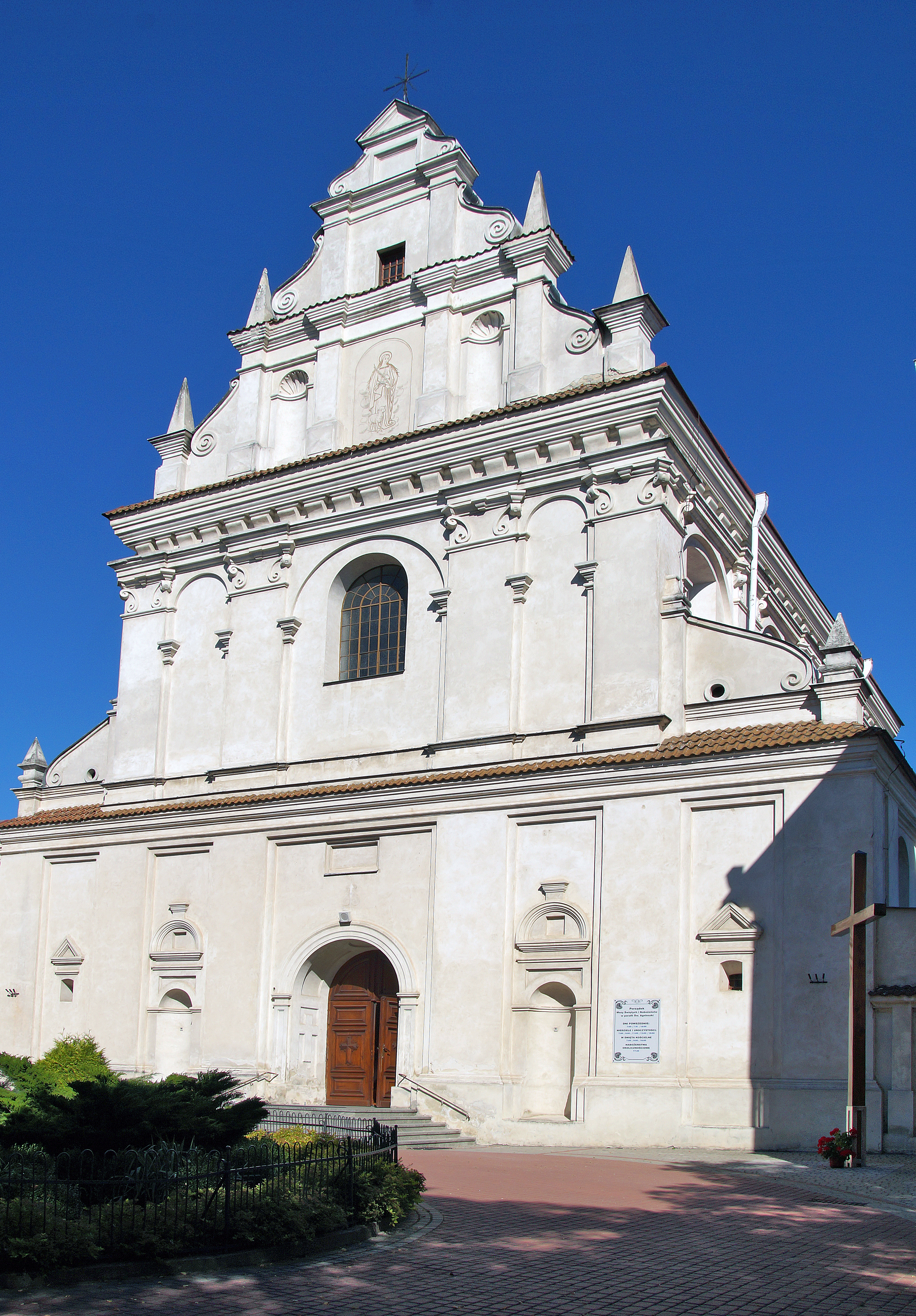
St Agnes Church in Lublin.
