= Zemborzyce =

Zemborzyce may refer to the following places in Poland:

- Zemborzyce Dolne
- Zemborzyce Podleśne
- Zemborzyce Tereszyńskie
- Zemborzyce Wojciechowskie
