= Lublin Airport railway station =

Railway station in Świdnik, Poland

Lublin Airport
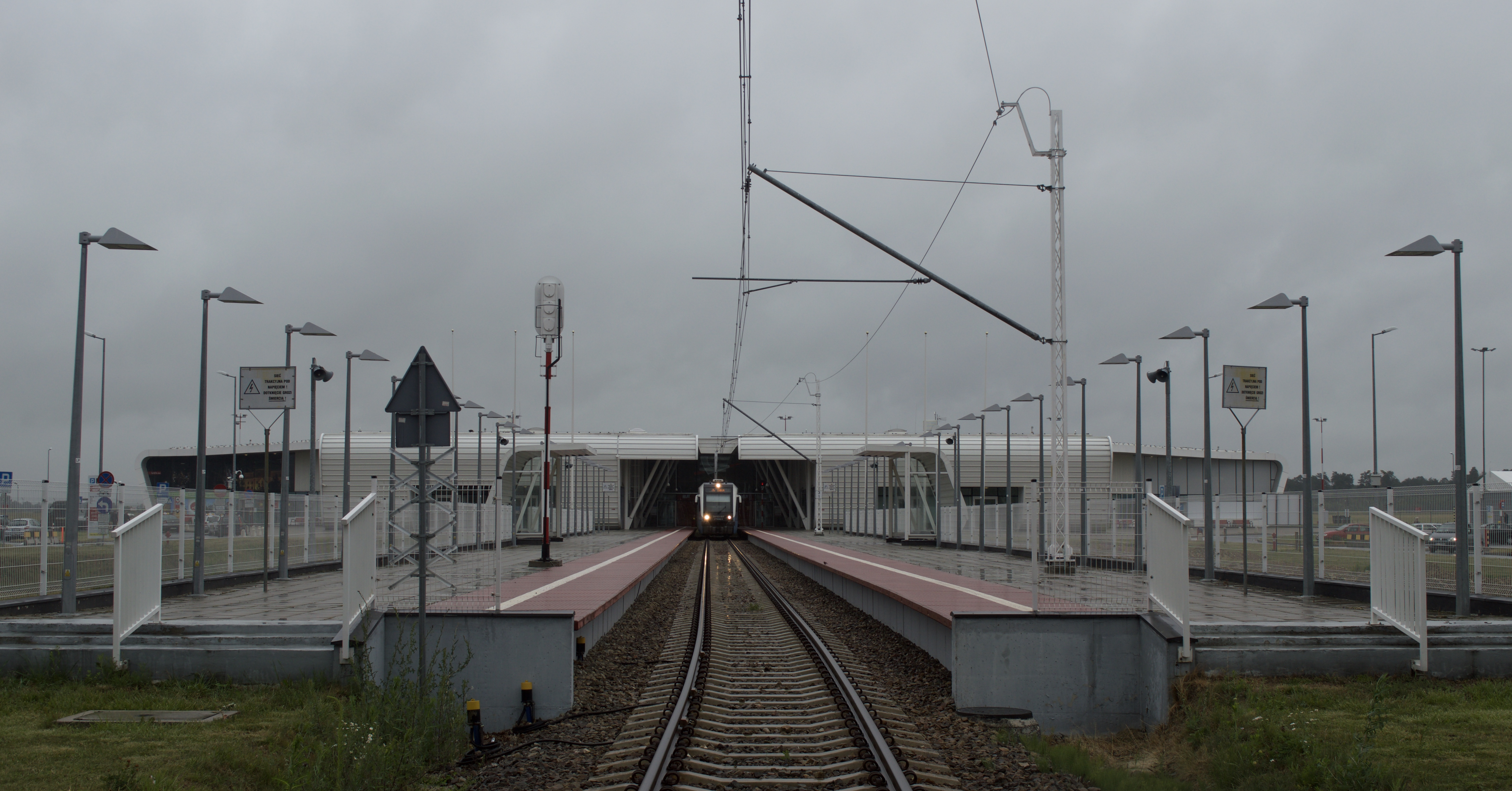
- Platforms at the train station (2017)

General information
- Location: Świdnik; Poland
- Coordinates: 51°14′05″N 22°42′56″E
- Manager: Lublin Airport
- Line: Świdnik–Świdnik Port Lotniczy line

History
- Opened: 14 December 2012
- Former names: Świdnik Port Lotniczy
Location
- Location within Poland

Lublin Airport is a railway station in Świdnik, in the Świdnik County, Lublin Voivodeship, located within the Lublin Airport area.

== History ==
=== Construction of the airport ===
In 1996, the Lublin Voivode, Edward Hunek, appointed a team to assess the location of an airport for the Lublin Land. Three possible sites were considered: Świdnik, Wilczopole, and Radawiec Duży. Three years later, it was decided that the airport would be built in Świdnik, and the company Port Lotniczy Lublin was established. In 2004, 25 local governments formed the company Międzynarodowy Port Lotniczy Lublin–Niedźwiada with the goal of building an airport near the village of Niedźwiada. The investment was supported by the local government of the region, led by the marshals from the Polish People's Party, but the cities of Lublin and Świdnik remained committed to Świdnik.

At the end of 2006, the city of Lublin purchased land for the airport in Świdnik, and in January 2007, the ruling coalition of the Civic Platform and Law and Justice parties decided that the airport for the Lublin Land would be built in Świdnik. The construction of the airport itself began in the autumn of 2010, and the first flight took place on 17 December 2012.

=== Construction of the railway station ===
The first ideas for building a railway line to Lublin Airport emerged in 2009. Initially, plans called for the construction of a non-electrified line, which led to the design of a semi-open stop.

In May 2012, PKP Polskie Linie Kolejowe signed a contract with Przedsiębiorstwo Robót Komunikacyjnych Expol for the construction of the non-electrified Świdnik–Świdnik Port Lotniczy line, measuring 2.2 km, along with the Świdnik Port Lotniczy railway station. On 12 November, a contract was signed with PKP Energetyka for the electrification of the line.

The tracks without the traction network were completed at the end of November. The official opening of the electrified line took place on 14 December, and on 17 December 2012, trains began operating in conjunction with the airport's opening. The airport became the first facility of its kind in Poland to include a railway line directly connecting the terminal with the city center from the outset.

In October 2013, it was announced that from December 2013, the stop would be named Lublin Airport instead of Świdnik Port Lotniczy. The decision was made by Lublin Airport, the station's operator.

== Railway lines ==
The station is located at the end of the single-track, electrified Świdnik–Świdnik Port Lotniczy line. A buffer stop is situated beyond the station.

== Infrastructure ==
The station features two single-sided platforms, each 149 meters long and 550 mm above the railhead. Both platforms serve the same track.

== Train traffic ==
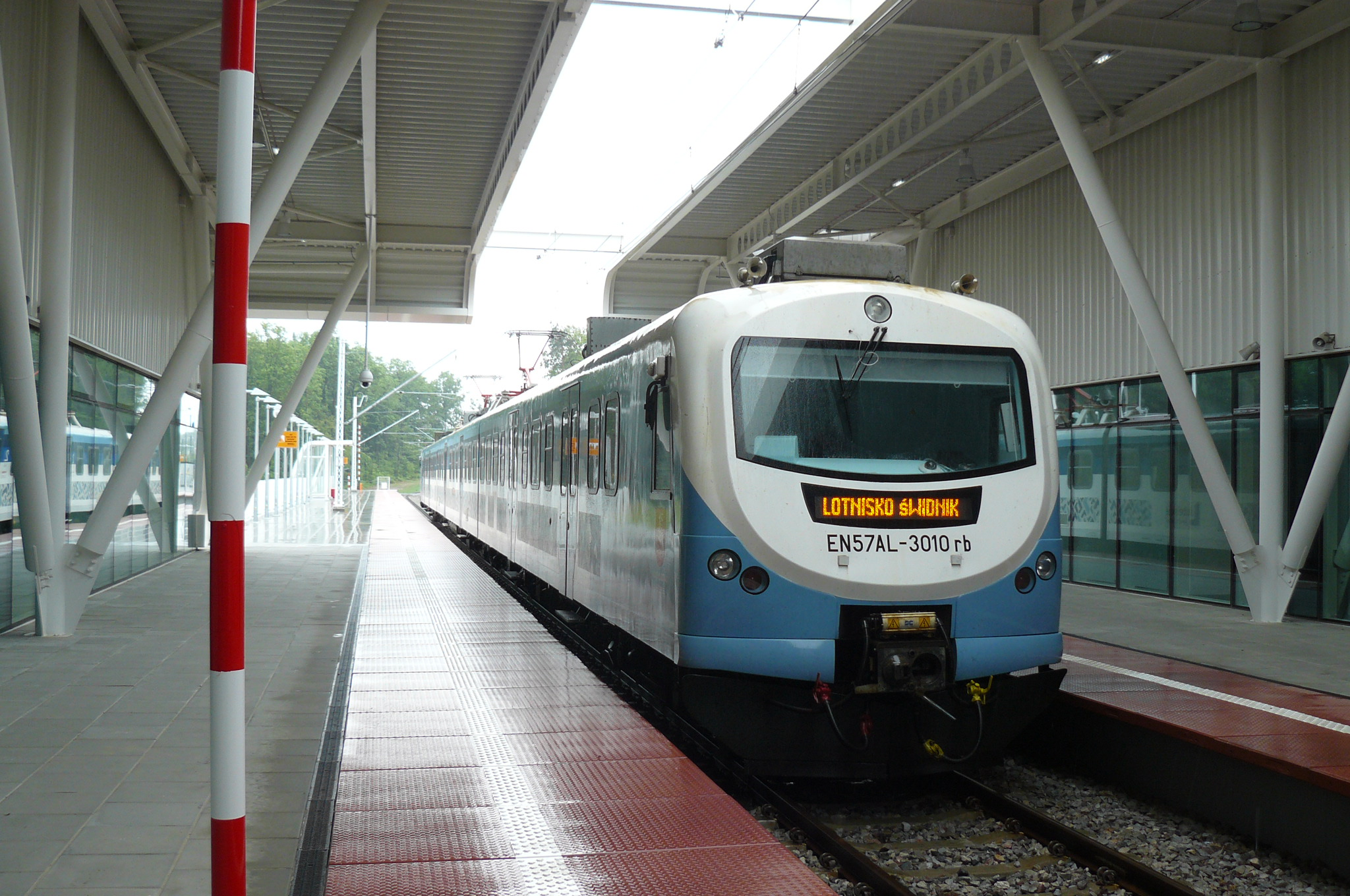
EN57AL at the station (2013)

In 2013, the station was served by Regio trains operated by Przewozy Regionalne on the Lublin Główny–Lublin Airport route. Initially, plans were made to use railbuses to service the line before the decision to electrify it. With this change, modernized electric multiple units of the EN57AL series were deployed. At the time of the station's inauguration, five daily connections were financed by the Lublin Voivodeship's local government. However, the train schedule was not aligned with flight schedules from the outset.

In October 2015, average train occupancy was examined and found to be just a dozen passengers per train. In 2016, due to reduced funding for regional rail services and a corresponding cutback in operations, the number of airport train services was reduced to three on weekdays and one on weekends. The airport trains were then primarily intended for airport staff commuting to work and served as a supplementary service for the Lublin Główny–Świdnik Miasto section.

=== Passenger exchange statistics ===
- 2017: 20–49 passengers per day
- 2022: 10–99 passengers per day
