= Motycz-Józefin =

- Village
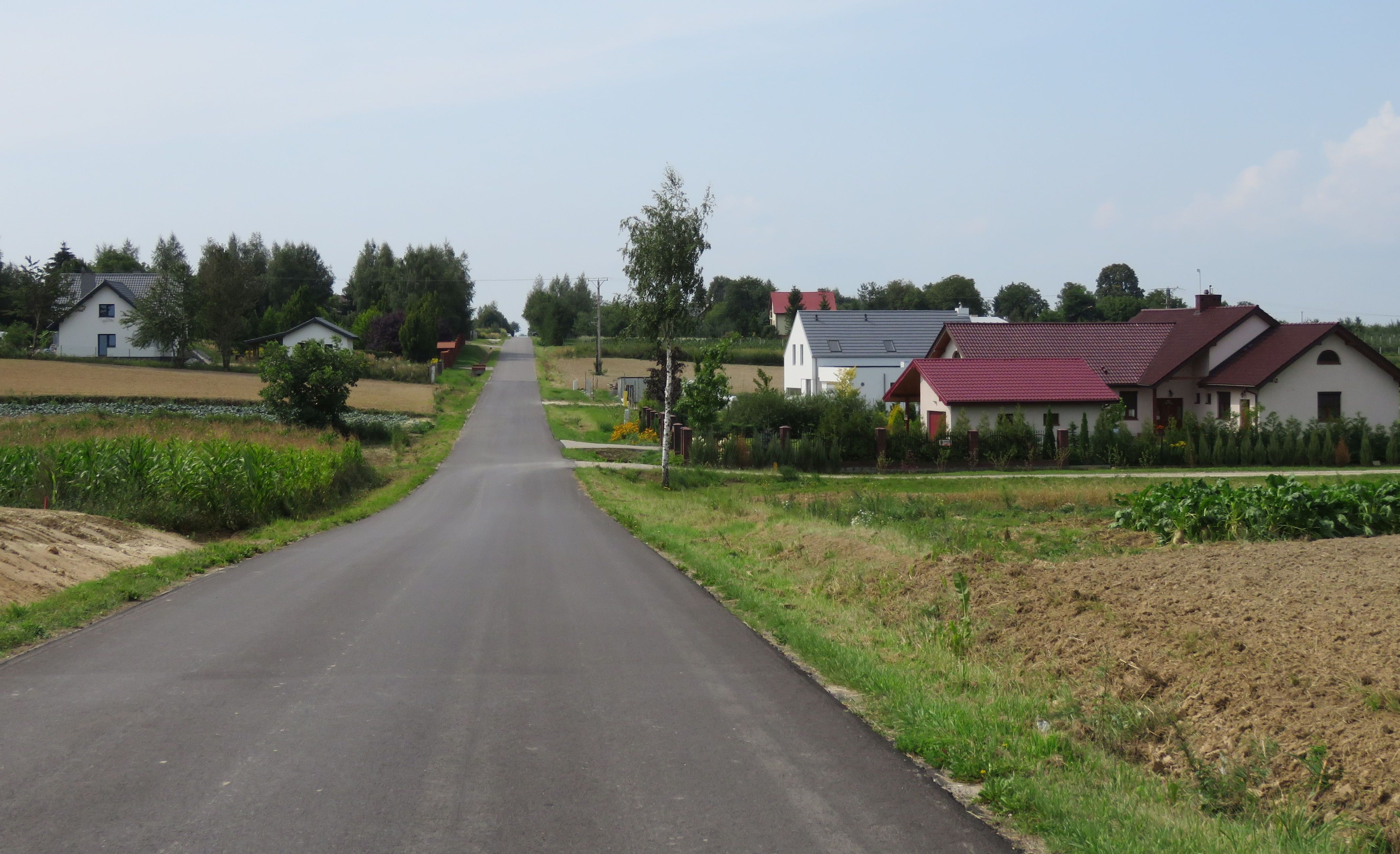

- Location within Poland
- Coordinates: 51°15′23″N 22°23′35″E
- Country: Poland
- Voivodeship: Lublin
- County: Lublin
- Gmina: Konopnica
- Time zone: UTC+1 (CET)
  - Summer (DST): UTC+2 (CEST)

Motycz-Józefin [ˈmɔtɨt͡ʂ juˈzɛfin] is a village in the administrative district of Gmina Konopnica, within Lublin County, Lublin Voivodeship, in eastern Poland.

== History ==
Twelve Polish citizens were murdered by Nazi Germany in the village during World War II.
