= Sporniak, Gmina Konopnica =

Sporniak
- Village
- Location within Poland
- Coordinates: 51°14′00″N 22°19′01″E
- Country: Poland
- Voivodeship: Lublin
- County: Lublin
- Gmina: Konopnica

Sporniak [ˈspɔrɲak] is a village in the administrative district of Gmina Konopnica, within Lublin County, Lublin Voivodeship, in eastern Poland.
