= Pawlin =

- Village
- Location within Poland
- Coordinates: 51°11′56″N 22°22′14″E
- Country: Poland
- Voivodeship: Lublin
- County: Lublin
- Gmina: Konopnica

Population
  - Total: 232

Pawlin [ˈpavlin] is a village in the administrative district of Gmina Konopnica, within Lublin County, Lublin Voivodeship, in eastern Poland.
