= Radawczyk Drugi =

- Village
- Location within Poland
- Coordinates: 51°11′02″N 22°24′38″E
- Country: Poland
- Voivodeship: Lublin
- County: Lublin
- Gmina: Konopnica

Population
  - Total: 200

Radawczyk Drugi [raˈdaft͡ʂɨk ˈdruɡi] is a village in the administrative district of Gmina Konopnica, within Lublin County, Lublin Voivodeship, in eastern Poland.
