= Lublin Główny railway station =

Railway station in Lublin, Poland

Lublin Główny
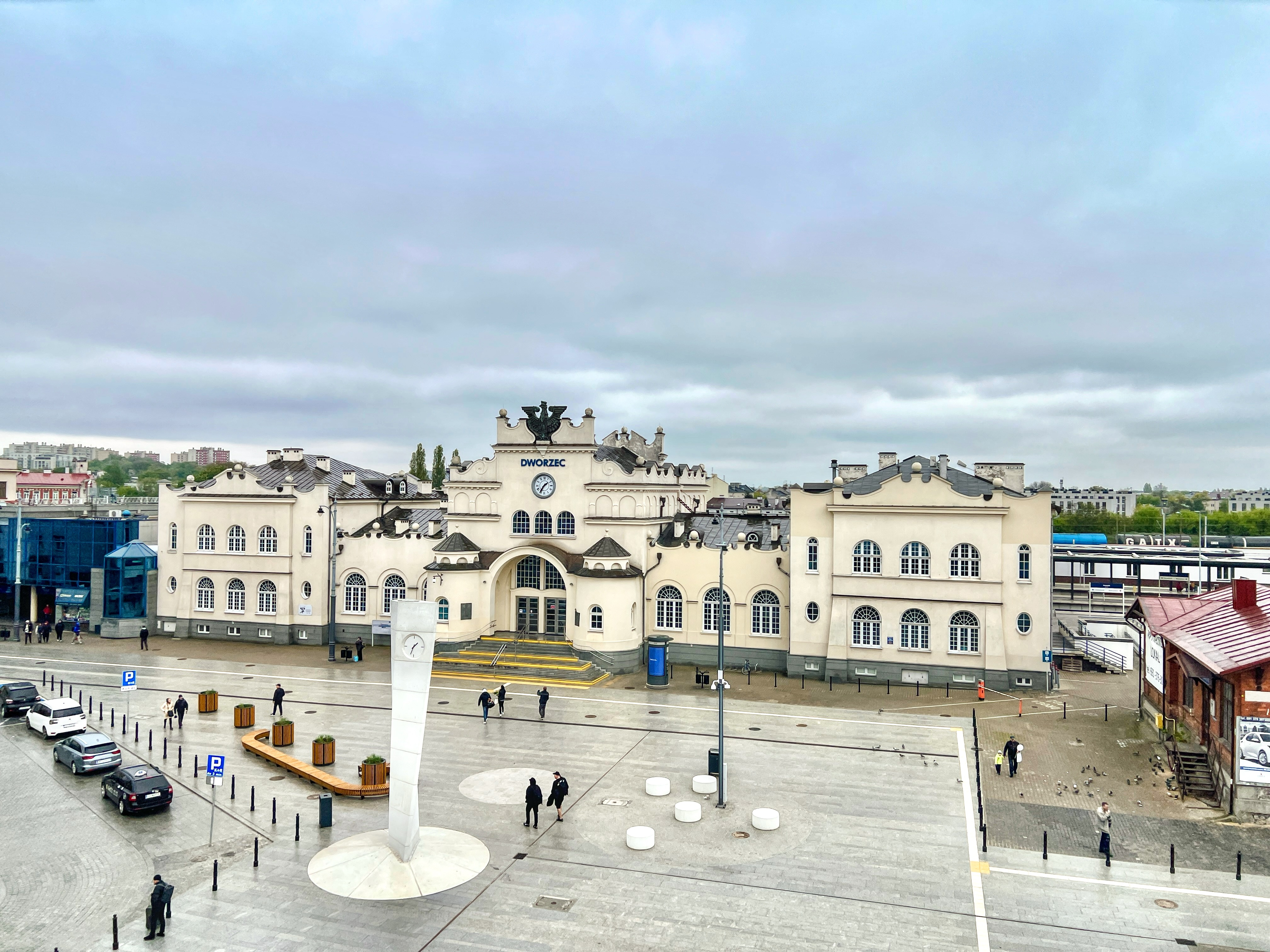

General information
- Location: Za Cukrownią, Lublin, Lublin Voivodeship; Poland
- Coordinates: 51°13′53.0″N 22°34′06.0″E
- System: A
- Owner: Polskie Koleje Państwowe S.A.
- Platforms: 5
- Tracks: 7 (platform edges)

History
- Opened: 1877
- Former names: Lublin

Services
Preceding station	PKP Intercity	Following station
Łuków towards Warszawa Zachodnia	Kyiv-Express	Świdnik Miasto towards Kyiv-Pasazhyrskyi
Route map
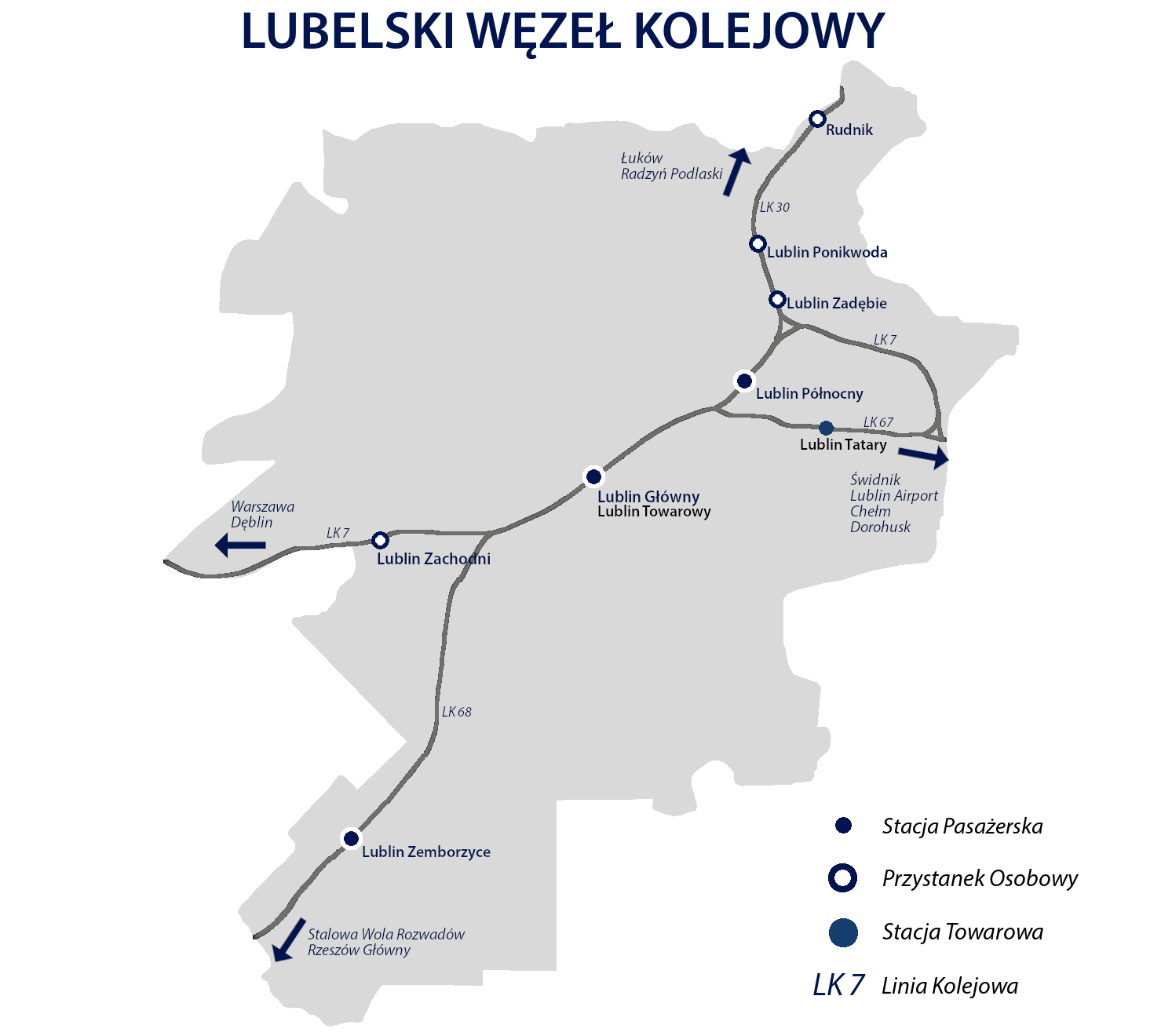
Location
- Location within Poland Location within Lublin Voivodeship

Lublin Główny (lit. 'Lublin Main') is the main railway station of the city of Lublin, in the Lublin Voivodeship in eastern Poland. The station serves trains running on the four lines radiating from Lublin: north-east to Warsaw, north to Łuków, east to Chełm and the border with Ukraine, and south to Przeworsk. It is one of the busiest stations in eastern Poland, with more than 50 train departures every day.

The station was renamed to Lublin Główny in December 2019 to distinguish it from other stations located in the city.

== History ==
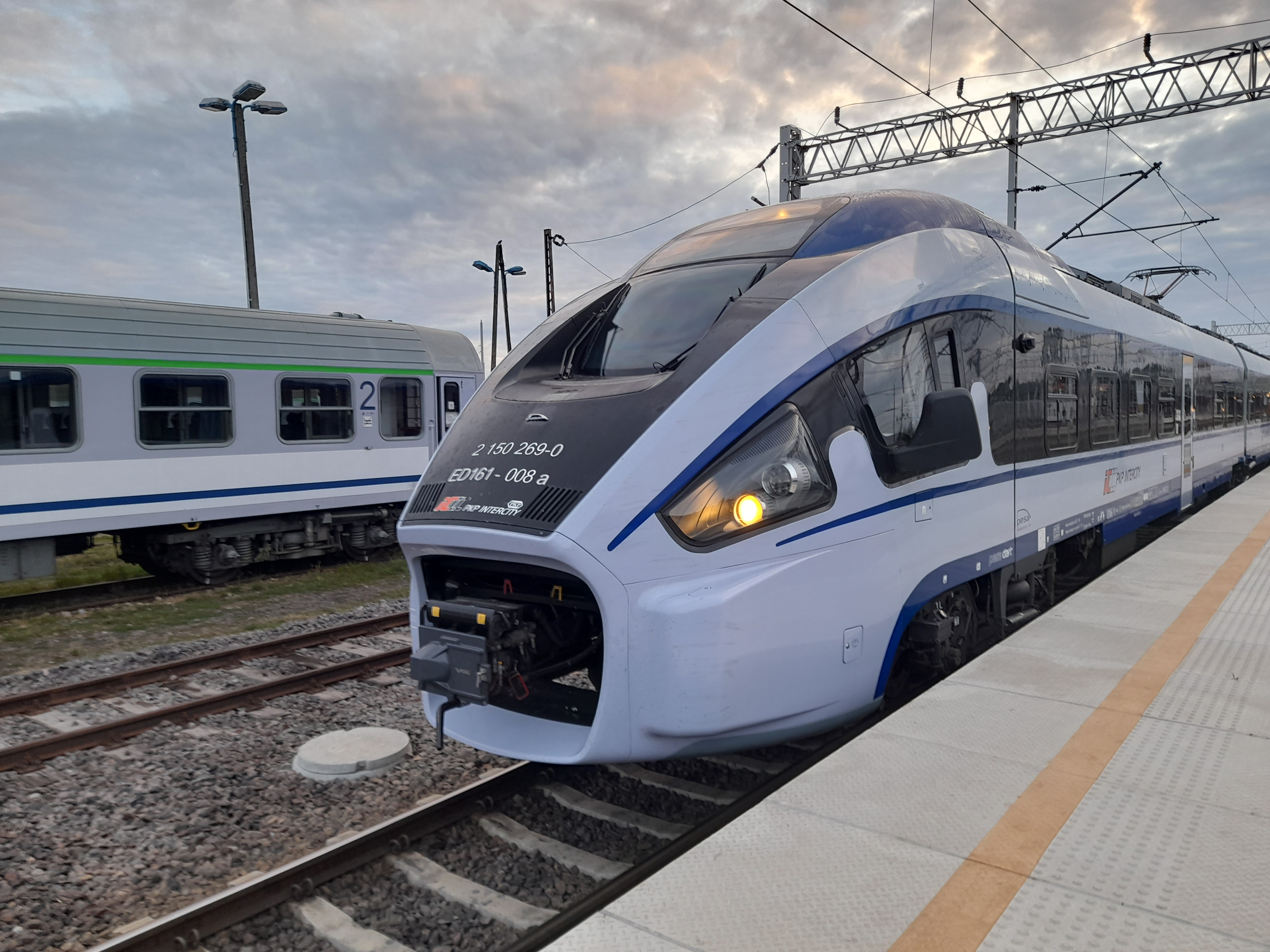
A PKP Intercity Pesa Dart "Baczyński" from Lublin bound for Wrocław Główny

The station was opened in 1877, together with the Vistula Railway, which connected Warsaw with Kovel. At the time Lublin was in the Russian Empire as part of Congress Poland.

Following the independence of Poland in 1918, the station building was rebuilt in the 1920s to give it a more Polish style, as the original building looked like a typical station of the Russian Empire. In recent years the station was completely refurbished. Because of this, it is now considered one of the best railway stations in Poland, according to Gazeta Wyborcza which gave it second place in the ranking of 23 most significant Polish railway stations.

A rail connection is established to Lublin Airport via Lublin Airport railway station.

== Upgrades and modernisations ==
In 2011 a modernisation of the line north of Lublin to Lubartów started. The 25 km (16 mi) single track section had its maximum speed upgraded to 120 km/h (75 mph), from previous 30–60 km/h (20–35 mph). Once finished, passenger services commenced starting from 2 April 2013.

In 2017 modernisation of the line between Lublin and Warsaw (specifically the section between Lublin and Pilawa) began, with rail traffic suspended during construction and trains between Warsaw and Lublin diverted via Łuków. The line reopened for limited service (using only one of the planned two tracks) in December 2019. Once the upgrades were completed, the trip time between Lublin and Warsaw was reduced to under 2 hours as of early 2023, with maximum train speed reaching 160 km/h (100 mph). The aim is to further reduce the travel times down to 90 minutes once all the track infrastructure upgrades are completed by around 2027.

Between 2018–2021 the platforms of the station were upgraded.

Up until early 2024, the Lublin intercity bus terminal was inconveniently located 3 km (1.9 mi) away from the main railway station, making train-bus transfers difficult. The new bus station was opened on 12 January 2024, and is located directly next to the station. The bus terminal and Lublin Główny will be part of Lublin Metropolitan Integrated Terminal.

== Platforms ==
Number of platforms as of 15 August 2022:

Platform 1: the longest platform adjacent to the station building. It is used by long-distance trains towards Radom, Warsaw (and beyond, such as to Wrocław, Gdynia and Kyiv via Dorohusk).

Platform 1A: served by shorter long-distance trains in the same directions as platform 1 and local trains to Dęblin. It is a terminus platform with a buffer stop.

Platform 1B: it used for sending local trains to Zamość, Chełm, and Lublin Airport. Similar to platform 1A it is a terminus platform.

Platform 2: it has two edges, used for sending long-distance and local trains towards Stalowa Wola Rozwadów, Rzeszów Główny (and beyond to Kraków Główny, Wrocław Główny, and towards Chełm, Lublin Airport.

Platform 3: it has two edges, mainly served by local trains towards Chełm, Włodawa and Zamość.

== Train services ==
At Lublin Główny stops local, express and fast trains (semi-express; train with more stops than express, but fewer than local trains). Local trains are managed by Polregio, (PR) while express and fast trains are managed by PKP Intercity under the InterCity (IC) and Twoje Linie Kolejowe (TLK) brands.
