= Lublin Airport =

Airport in the east of Poland

Lublin Airport Port Lotniczy Lublin

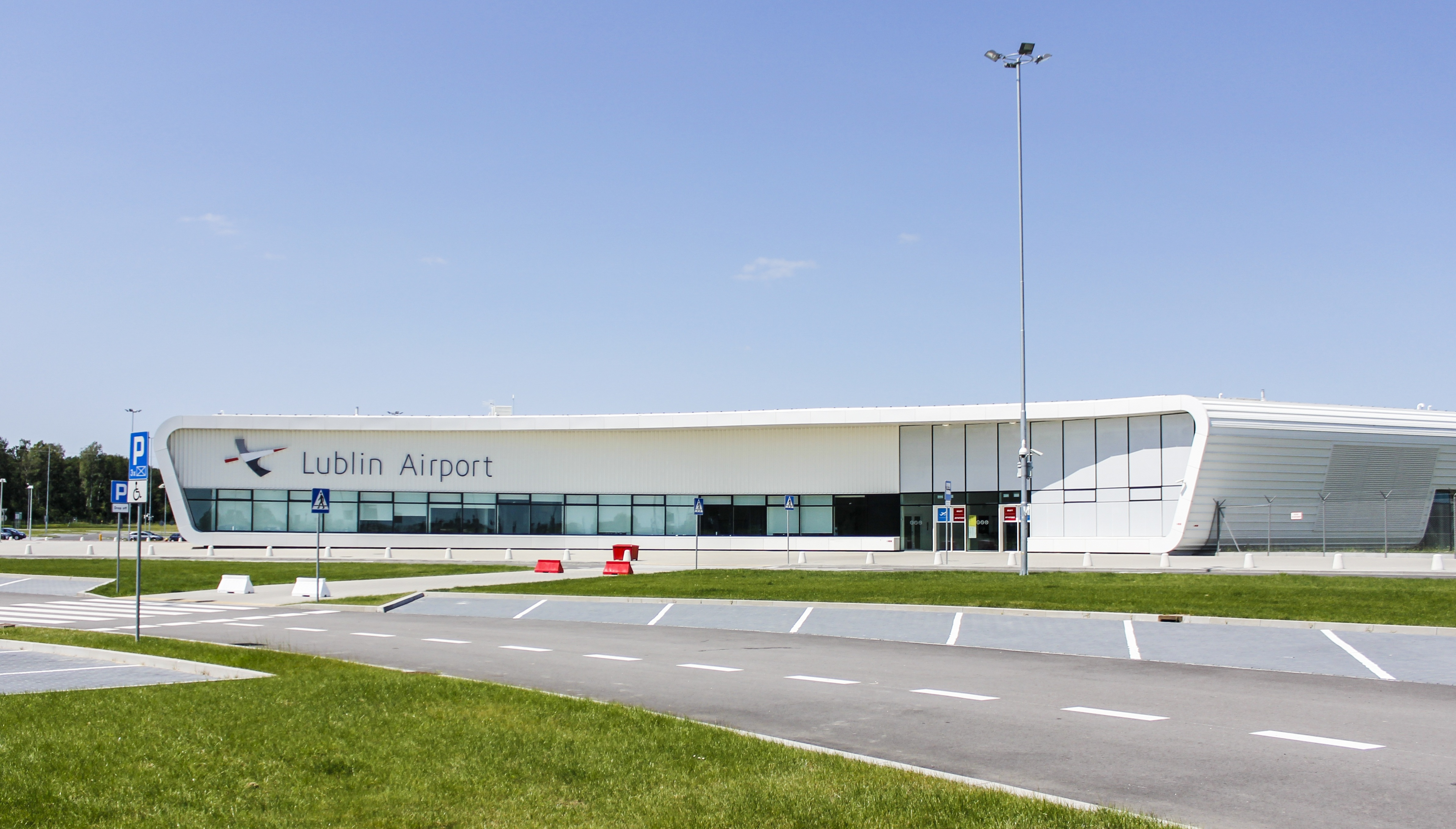
- IATA: LUZ; ICAO: EPLB

Summary
- Airport type: Public
- Serves: Lublin, Poland
- Location: Świdnik
- Opened: December 17, 2012
- Elevation AMSL: 193 m (633 ft)
- Coordinates: 51°14′25.00″N 022°42′49.00″E
- Website: airport.lublin.pl

Map
- Location of the airport in Poland

Runways
Direction	Length		Surface
Direction	m	ft	Surface
06/24	1,200	3,937	Grass
07/25	2,520	8,267	Asphalt

Statistics (2018)
- Passengers: 455,188
- Aircraft Movements: 4,980
- Sources: GCM, STV

Lublin Airport (Port Lotniczy Lublin) (IATA: LUZ, ICAO: EPLB) is an airport in Poland serving Lublin and the surrounding region. The site is located about 10 km (6.2 miles) east of central Lublin, adjacent to the town of Świdnik. The airport has a 2520 × (45 + 2 × 7.5) m runway (8,270 × 200 ft), and the terminal facilities are capable of handling four Boeing 737-800 class aircraft simultaneously. Construction began in the fall of 2010 and the official opening took place on December 17, 2012. The new airport replaced the grass airstrip (1,200 × 50 m or 1,312 × 55 yd), which had served the PZL-Świdnik helicopter factory, and was known as Świdnik Airport with the ICAO identifier EPSW.

== History ==
=== Early years ===
The construction of the Świdnik airfield began in 1935 and it was officially opened on 4 June 1939. It was to serve as a training centre with a pilot school, and was built by the Airborne and Antigas Defence League, a mass organisation propagating aviation among the general public. During World War II, it was used by the Luftwaffe after Poland was occupied in September 1939, and then by the Soviet Air Force once Lublin was captured by the Red Army in July 1944. The Germans destroyed the airfield's buildings before withdrawing.

=== After World War II ===
The airport opened for passenger traffic on 30 November 1945. A domestic service was opened with flight number 1/2 that flew the route Warsaw – Łódź – Kraków – Rzeszów – Lublin – Warsaw. Unfortunately, there is very little written material from the time that mentions this route, so proper sources are required.. The route was later discontinued and Lublin lost all domestic services. In 1949, the Polish government made a decision to build an aviation factory in Świdnik, located next to the airfield. It assembled its first helicopters in 1956, with full-scale production beginning in 1957.

The factory employed some staff from the pre-war Lubelska Wytwórnia Samolotów, an airplane manufacturer in Lublin that functioned from 1936 to 1939, being itself the successor of Plage i Laśkiewicz factory which functioned between 1920 and 1935. That factory had its own airfield within the Lublin city limits, but it was closed and built over after the war. One of the streets running through the area where the airfield used to be is named Lotnicza (Aviation Street).

=== Current facilities ===
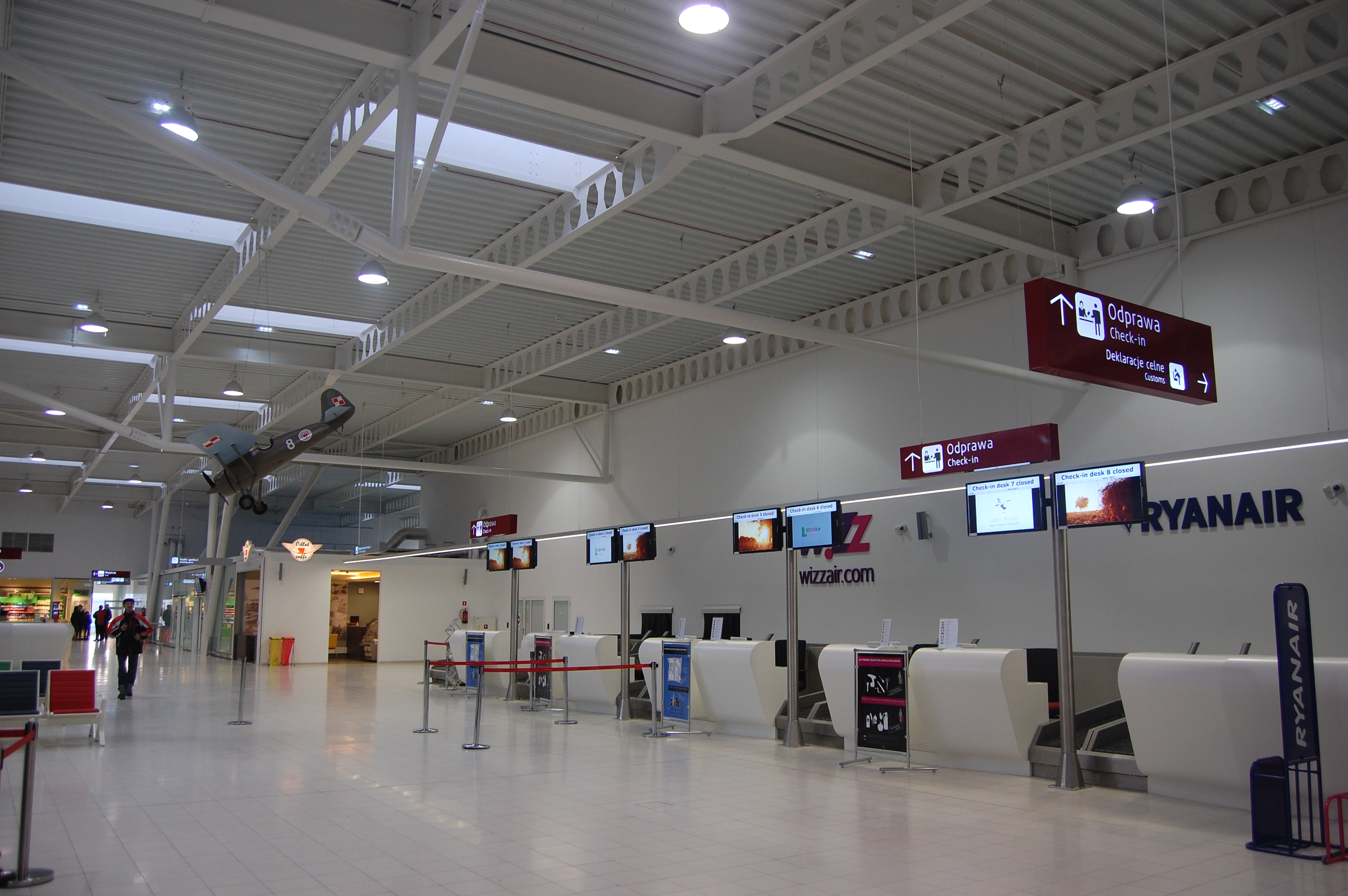
Terminal interior

The need for an air terminus in Lublin, the 9th biggest city in Poland, has been felt for the better half of 20th century. In 2008, the project received €84.1 million financing backing from the European Union. Subsequently, the airport design competition was won by a Polish-Spanish consortium of SENER Ingeniería y Sistemas (engineering & master plan) and Warsaw-based architectural firm ARÉ (architecture). The architectural design was well received by the design community; however the fit and finish of the completed terminal building fell short of the winning proposal. The contract to build the runway was signed in August, 2011, with completion in late 2012. Operations commenced on December 17, 2012, with a Category I instrument landing system, which was later upgraded to a Category II system for low visibility operations.

A Reuters special report in December 2014 highlighted Lublin Airport (along with Łódź and Rzeszów airports) as a target of inefficient EU subsidies with disappointing passenger numbers.

In July 2016, Lufthansa announced the termination of its route from Frankfurt Airport to Lublin due to low demand by 29 October 2016 after only two years of service. In September 2015, Wizz Air opened its base at Lublin Airport with one Airbus A320. In November 2017, the company announced that they will close its base in Lublin that resulted in terminating services to Doncaster/Sheffield, Liverpool and Tel Aviv in June 2018, decreasing frequency on the route to Oslo and further termination of service to Kyiv and Stockholm in late October 2018. In October 2018, easyJet ended its only route from Lublin to Milan-Malpensa.

In January 2021, the airport opened a small cargo facility.

== Airlines and destinations ==
The following airlines operate regular scheduled and charter flights at Lublin Airport:

=== Passenger destinations ===
Airlines	Destinations
LOT Polish Airlines	Warsaw–Chopin
Ryanair	Bergamo, Dublin, Gdańsk, Girona, London–Luton, Trapani
Wizz Air	London–Luton, Maastricht/Aachen; Seasonal: Burgas, Rijeka, Split

=== Cargo destinations ===
Airlines	Destinations
El Al Cargo	Frankfurt, Tel Aviv

== Passenger statistics ==
Traffic by calendar year
	Passengers	Change	Movements
2012	5,702	Steady	50
2013	189,699	▲3,226.9%	2,246
2014	187,595	▼1.1%	3,254
2015	265,111	▲41.3%	3,732
2016	377,606	▲42.4%	4,234
2017	430,346	▲14.0%	4,980
2018	455,188	▲5.4%	5,283
2019	357,366	▼22.0%	4,389
2020	124,199	▼65.2%	2,285
2021	108,117	▼12.9%	2,964
2022	330,064	▲205.3%	4,191
2023	398,785	▲20.8%	3,730

== Ground transportation ==
=== Train ===
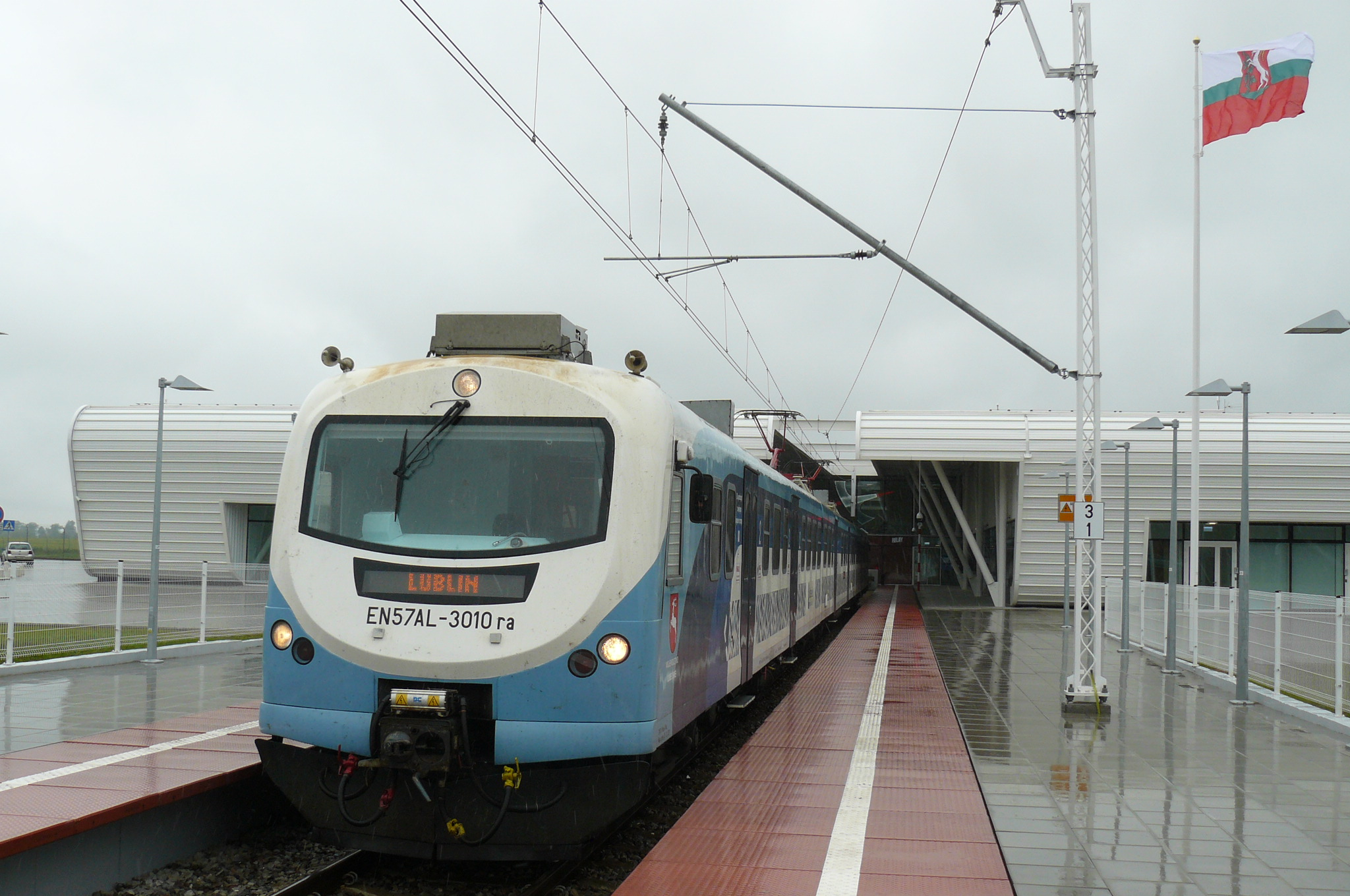
Train at the Lublin Airport railway station

Lublin Airport is accessible by rail, with a railway station inside the airport terminal built at the end of a dedicated 3.7 kilometre line connecting to Lublin's main railway station. The journey takes approximately 15 minutes. For a time in 2021, with patronage having fallen to below 50 passengers a day, the train was replaced by a bus service but it has been restored since 2022.

=== Bus ===
There is a dedicated bus service to the airport, with a flexible schedule, which starts its run to the airport 2 hours before each flight departure, and leaves the airport 25 minutes after flight arrival.

=== Car ===
The airport is located close to Expressways S17 and S12.

== See also ==
- List of airports in Poland
