= Zemborzyce Wojciechowskie =

- Village
- Location within Poland
- Coordinates: 51°10′39″N 22°27′14″E
- Country: Poland
- Voivodeship: Lublin
- County: Lublin
- Gmina: Konopnica

Zemborzyce Wojciechowskie (Polish pronunciation: [zɛmbɔˈʐɨt͡sɛ vɔjt͡ɕɛˈxɔfskʲɛ]) is a village in the administrative district of Gmina Konopnica, within Lublin County, Lublin Voivodeship, in eastern Poland.
