= Zemborzyce Podleśne =

- Village
- Location within Poland
- Coordinates: 51°11′54″N 22°29′5″E
- Country: Poland
- Voivodeship: Lublin
- County: Lublin
- Gmina: Konopnica

Zemborzyce Podleśne [zɛmbɔˈʐɨt͡sɛ pɔdˈlɛɕnɛ] is a village in the administrative district of Gmina Konopnica, within Lublin County, Lublin Voivodeship, in eastern Poland.
