= Świdnik =

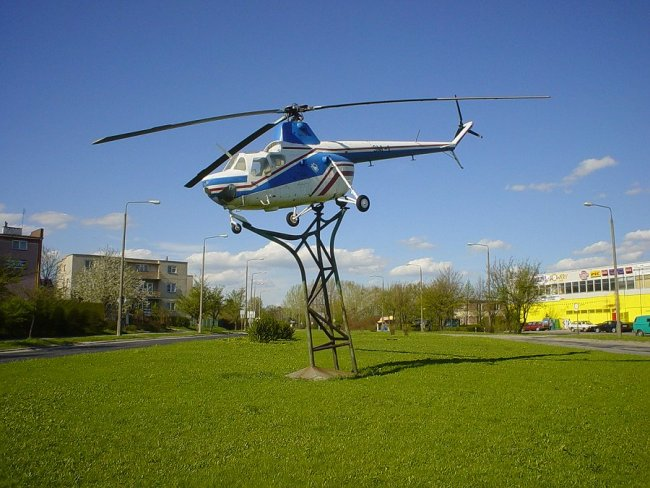
- SM-1 helicopter near PZL factory

- Flag Coat of arms

- Location within Poland
- Coordinates: 51°13′N 22°42′E
- Country: Poland
- Voivodeship: Lublin
- County: Świdnik
- Gmina: Świdnik (urban gmina)
- Established: 14th century
- Town rights: 1954

Government
  - Mayor: Marcin Dmowski

Area
  - Total: 20.35 km^{2} (7.86 sq mi)

Population (2015)
  - Total: 40,040
  - Density: 1,968/km^{2} (5,096/sq mi)
- Time zone: UTC+1 (CET)
  - Summer (DST): UTC+2 (CEST)
- Postal code: 21-040 – 21-047
- Area code: +48 81
- Car plates: LSW
- Website: www.swidnik.pl

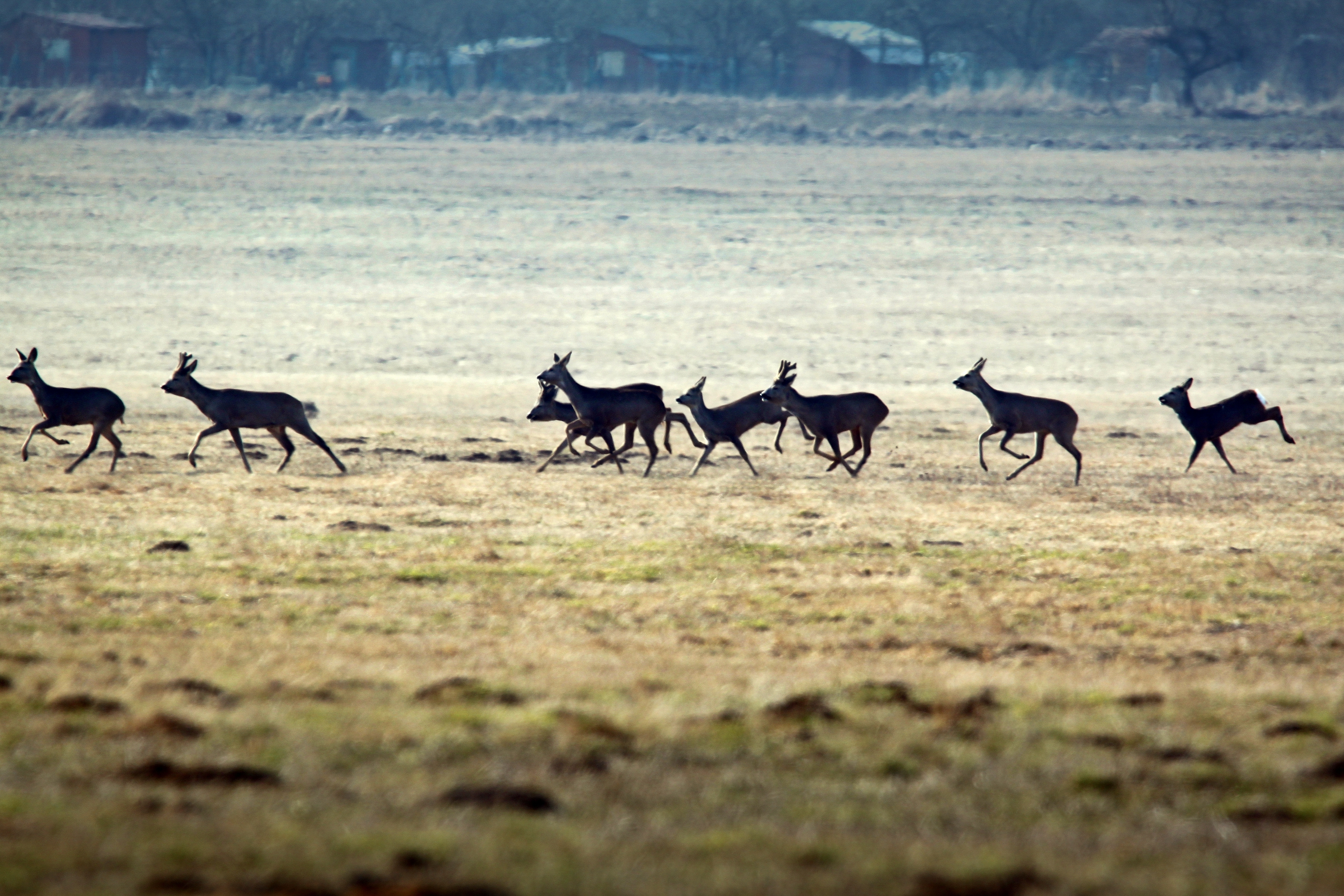
Swidnik airport holds natural habitat for the spotted souslik

Świdnik (Polish pronunciation: [ˈɕfidɲik]) is a town in southeastern Poland with 40,186 inhabitants (2012), situated in the Lublin Voivodeship, 10 kilometres (6 miles) southeast of the city of Lublin. It is the capital of Świdnik County. Świdnik belongs to the historic province of Lesser Poland, and was first mentioned in historical records in the year 1392. It remained a village until the end of the 19th century when it began to develop as a spa, due to its location and climate.

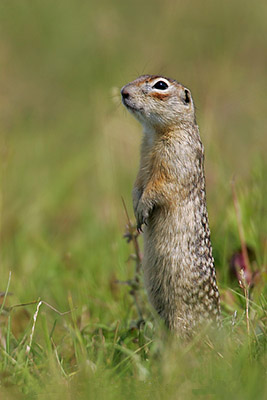
Spotted Souslik

In the early Middle Ages, the area of Świdnik was under the authority of a castellan from nearby Lublin. In the location of the current city three villages existed: Adampol, Świdnik and Krępiec (the name of the city itself was later taken from the village which was located in the immediate vicinity of the PZL Świdnik factory).

Świdnik, due to its location, is often considered to be a Satellite town of Lublin. The town is host to various industrial and advanced technology companies. It is a part of the Lublin Agglomeration, extending its business-oriented capabilities.

There are other villages named Świdnik in Poland, as well as Svidník, a town in Slovakia.

== History ==
The first documented mention of Świdnik comes from the year 1392, and at that time the village was called Świdnik Wielki (Maior Swidnik, Magna Swydnyk). In the early 15th century, a Świdnik Mały (Świdnik Minor) appeared in documents and, in 1450, another village, Świdniczek, was mentioned. In 1564, Świdnik Wielki had a folwark, 32 peasants, 14 houses and a public house, and belonged to Lesser Poland's Lublin Voivodeship. After the Partitions of Poland, all three villages briefly belonged to the Habsburg Empire (1795–1807). In 1815, they became part of Russian-controlled Congress Poland. During the January Uprising, several skirmishes between Russian units and Polish rebels took place in the area of Świdnik. The biggest one was the Battle of Fajsławice (August 24, 1863), in which 63 Poles were killed. The battle is now commemorated by a monument. In 1877, Świdnik received its first rail connection, on the newly completed Vistula River Railroad. In 1905 – 1914, a red brick station was built; it now is the oldest public utility building in the city.

During World War I, heavy fighting between Russian and German and Austro-Hungarian units took place in the area of Świdnik (August 1914, July 1915). On July 30, 1915, the city was captured by the Austro-Hungarian Army, and remained under Austrian occupation until November 1918. A World War I military cemetery is located in the outskirts of Świdnik. In late 1918, the town became part of Lublin Voivodeship in the Second Polish Republic. At that time Świdnik developed as a spa due to its unique microclimate. Świdnik's district of Adampol was a popular leisure destination among residents of Lublin in the 1920s and 1930s.

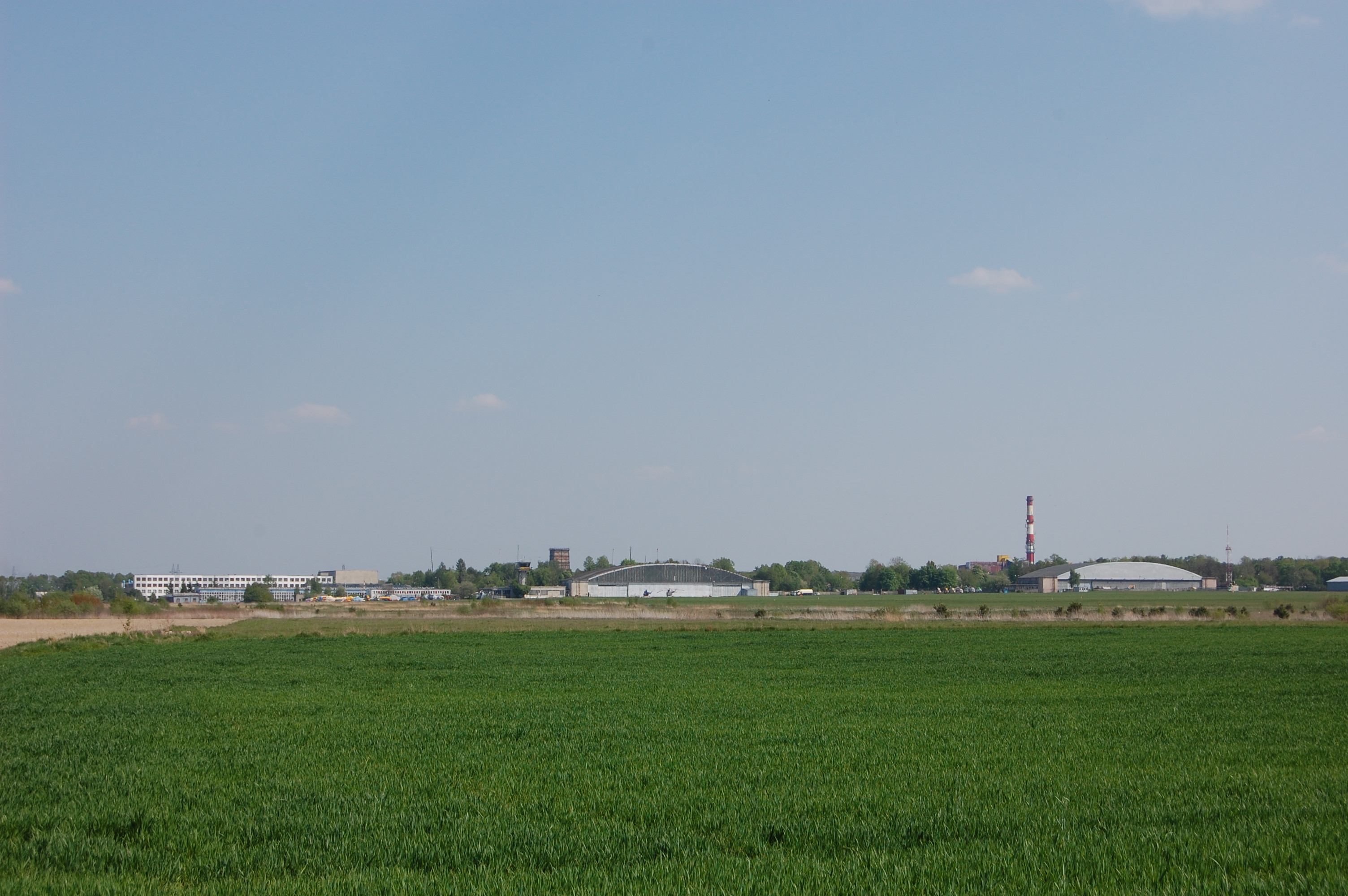
Świdnik Airport

Prior to World War II an airfield was built, which probably influenced the postwar decision of the government of the People's Republic of Poland to locate the PZL Świdnik plant here in the early 1950s. In 1937, the government of Poland purchased 136 hectares of land from the Daughters of Charity of Saint Vincent de Paul and, in the autumn of that same year, construction of the complex of School of Civilian Pilots of the Airborne and Antigas Defence League was initiated. The school unofficially opened in late June 1938, and the first pilot training was carried out in the autumn of 1938. The size of the Świdnik airfield was 800 x 750 meters, and the official opening of the school took place on June 4, 1939. Both the airport and the school were bombed by the Luftwaffe on September 2, 1939, but the Wehrmacht did not capture Świdnik until September 17. During World War II, the Germans used the airfield and its facilities for their military purposes; it was one of main centers of the Luftwaffe in initial stages of Operation Barbarossa.

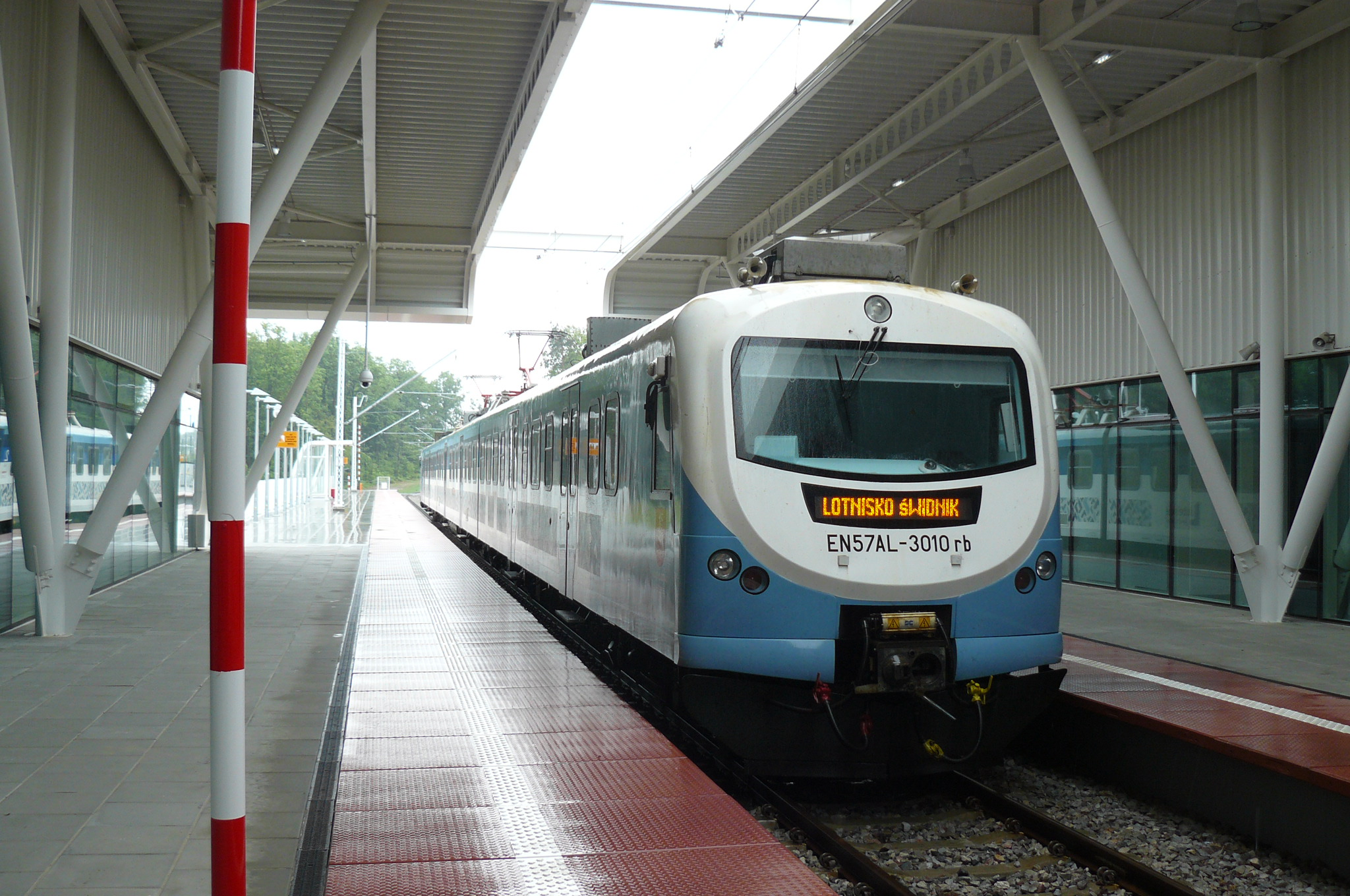
Lublin Świdnik Airport

During the war, numerous Polish resistance units operated in the area of Świdnik, including the Home Army. In October 1941, Germans opened the Majdanek concentration camp, located in the village Majdan Tatarski, between Świdnik and Lublin. Furthermore, at the Krępiec Forest near Świdnik, numerous executions took place. As many as 30,000 people were murdered in these executions. The victims were largely both Polish and Jewish prisoners from the Majdanek Camp, the Lublin Castle prison and from other nearby towns and villages. The largest execution took place here on November 3, 1943, when German units shot 18,000 Jews. The massacres are commemorated by a monument-tomb, unveiled in the 1970s. In July 1944, Świdnik was captured by the Red Army. The Soviets immediately made use of the airfield, which had been sabotaged by the Germans prior to their retreat. On August 11, 1944 the first Soviet plane carrying members of the legitimate Polish government (see Government Delegation for Poland) took off from the airfield bound for Moscow. The Soviet Air Forces continued to make use of the Świdnik airfield until spring of 1946.

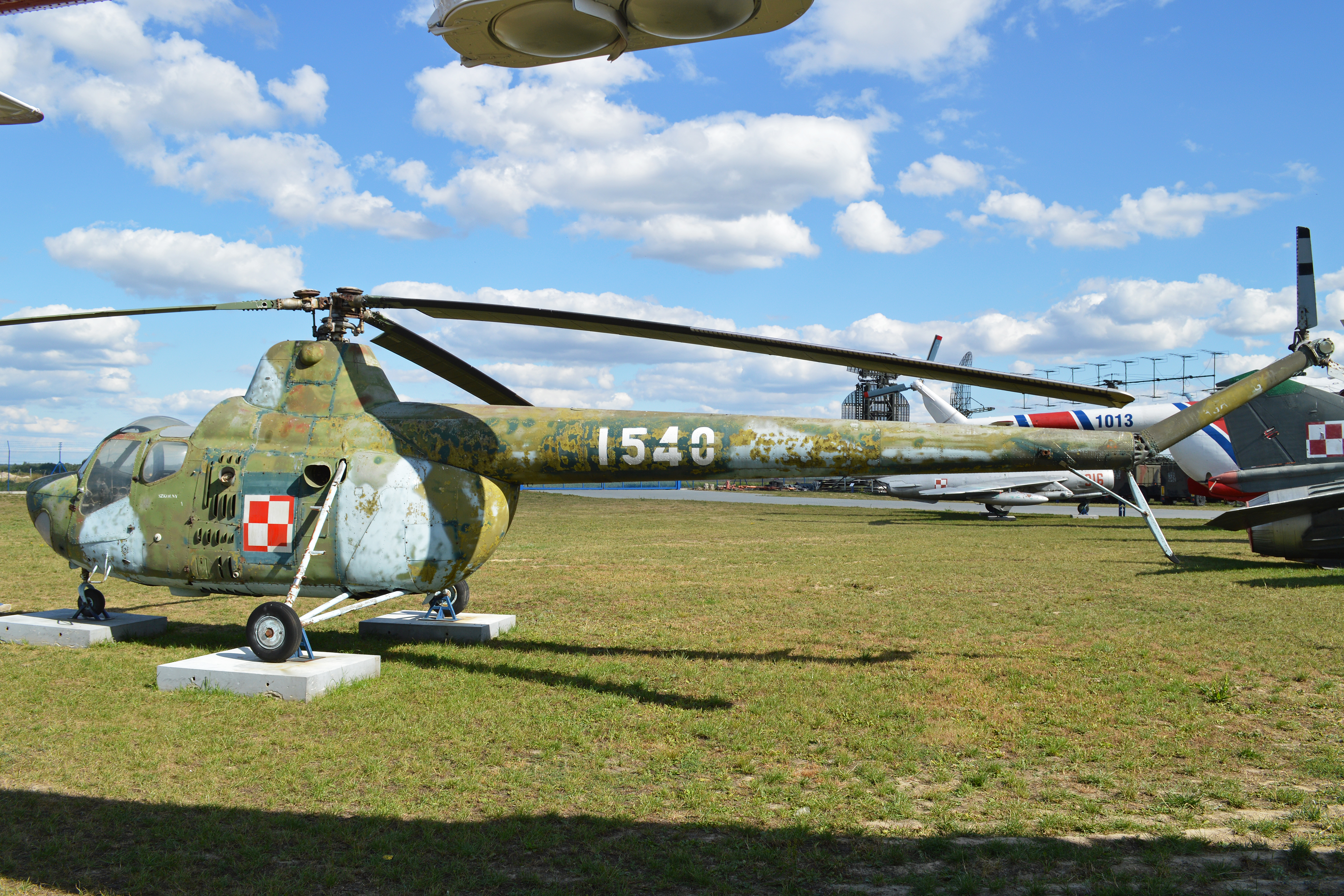
WSK PZL-Swidnik SM-1-300 '1540'

In 1949 the first trees were felled in the location of the future Transportation Equipment Factory (Wytwórnia Sprzętu Komunikacyjnego, WSK). The factory, which opened in 1951, quickly became one of the main centres of helicopter production both in the Eastern bloc and in Europe as a whole. In 1957 the factory was formally renamed WSK "PZL-Świdnik". In the 1950s, a number of new blocks of flats for the workers was built, which resulted in rapid population growth. In 1951, a high school was opened to accommodate the families of these workers and, in 1952, production began at the factory. In 1951, the population of the settlement was 2,800 but, by 1955, it grew to almost 7,500. A town charter was granted to Świdnik in 1954. The first helicopter produced here, the Soviet-designed SM-1 (Mil Mi-1), flew in 1956 – around 1,800 were produced in Świdnik. In 1965 production switched to the Mil Mi-2, of which 5,450 were produced over the next three decades. The factory was its exclusive manufacturer. In the 1980s the factory started producing helicopters of Polish design – PZL W-3 Sokół and PZL SW-4 Puszczyk. Świdnik was designed as a model Communist town (see Urban planning in communist countries). New districts were built in the 1960s and 1970s, with schools, health centers, hospital and a cinema. Following the example of Nowa Huta, Communist authorities did not allow the construction of a Roman Catholic church for many years, despite the pledges of residents. The government finally relented in 1977. By then, the population of Świdnik was well over 20,000. On July 8, 1980 a strike started in the WSK factory, which quickly spread to other factories in the Lublin region and brought the local economy to a standstill. The Communist government eventually managed to quell these mass protests by granting the workers many of their demands. However, the pressure for change generated by the strikes in turn led to the August strikes in Gdańsk and elsewhere on Poland's Baltic Sea Coast, which shortly after led to the emergence of the Solidarity movement. During the Martial law in Poland, the town was an important center of both active and nonviolent resistance. On December 13, 1981, the workers at PZL Świdnik began a strike action, in protest of the Communist government. The plant was immediately surrounded by security services and Polish Army tanks and armoured vehicles. The strike was broken on December 15, when armed forces entered the factory. In the summer 1982 the town became famous across Poland for the so-called Świdnik Walks (Świdnickie spacery), in which its residents went for walks with their families and children at the time of the main news broadcast (Dziennik Telewizyjny, at 7:30 p.m. daily), in protest of Communist propaganda.

=== 21st Century ===
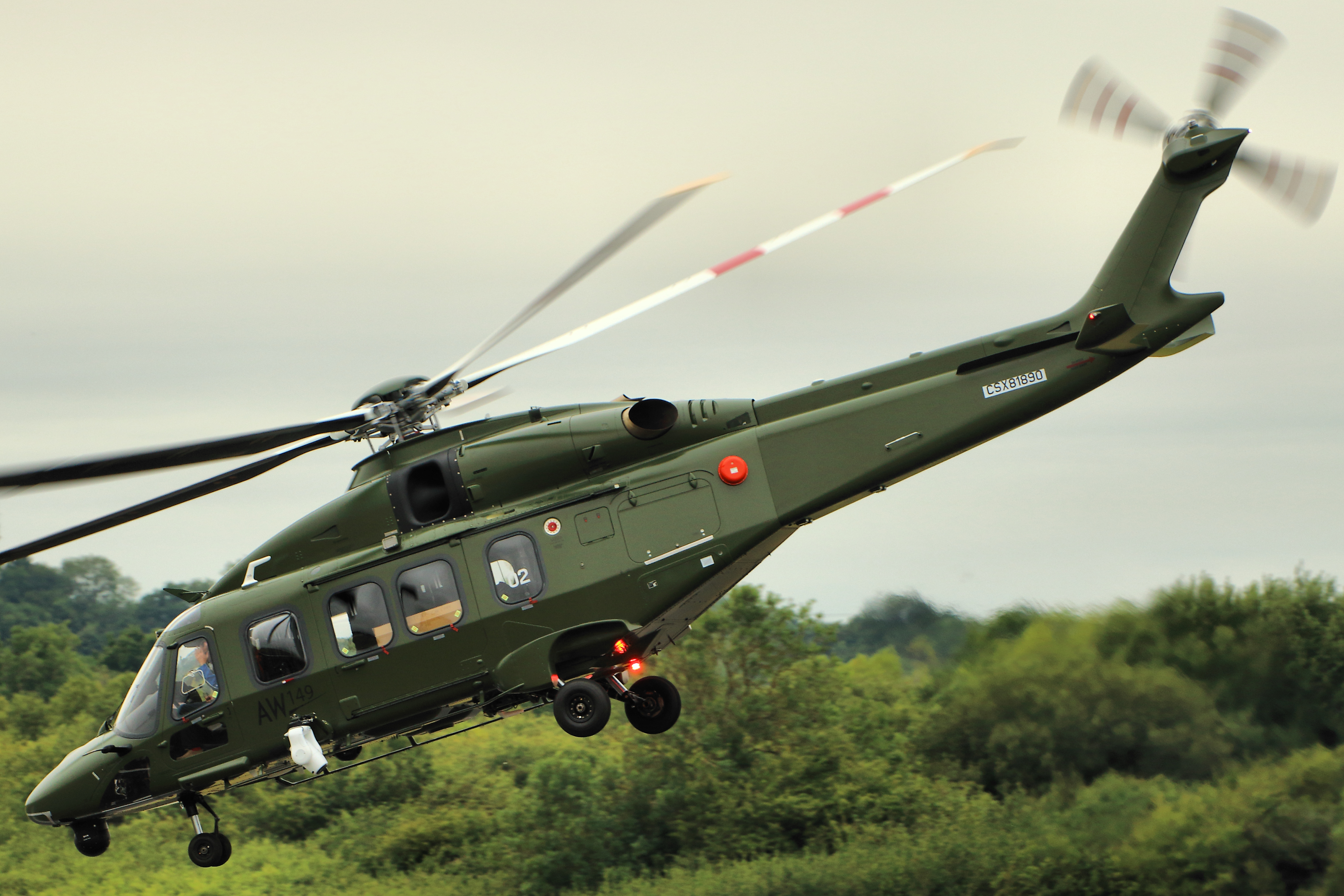
AW149

In 2010, AgustaWetland acquired PZL-Swidnik. Following this, the factory began production of a new type of medium-lift military helicopter, the AgustaWestland AW149.

In January 2023, Świdnik abolished their LGBT-free zone in response to fearing that they would stop receiving EU subsidies.

== Transport ==
The S17 and the S12 expressways, still under construction in some areas, concurrently bypass Świdnik before diverging at Piaski; Lublin Airport, located on the town's outskirts, serves the whole voivodeship. Świdnik also has a rail station on a major line from Lublin towards Chełm and the border with Ukraine.

== Sport ==
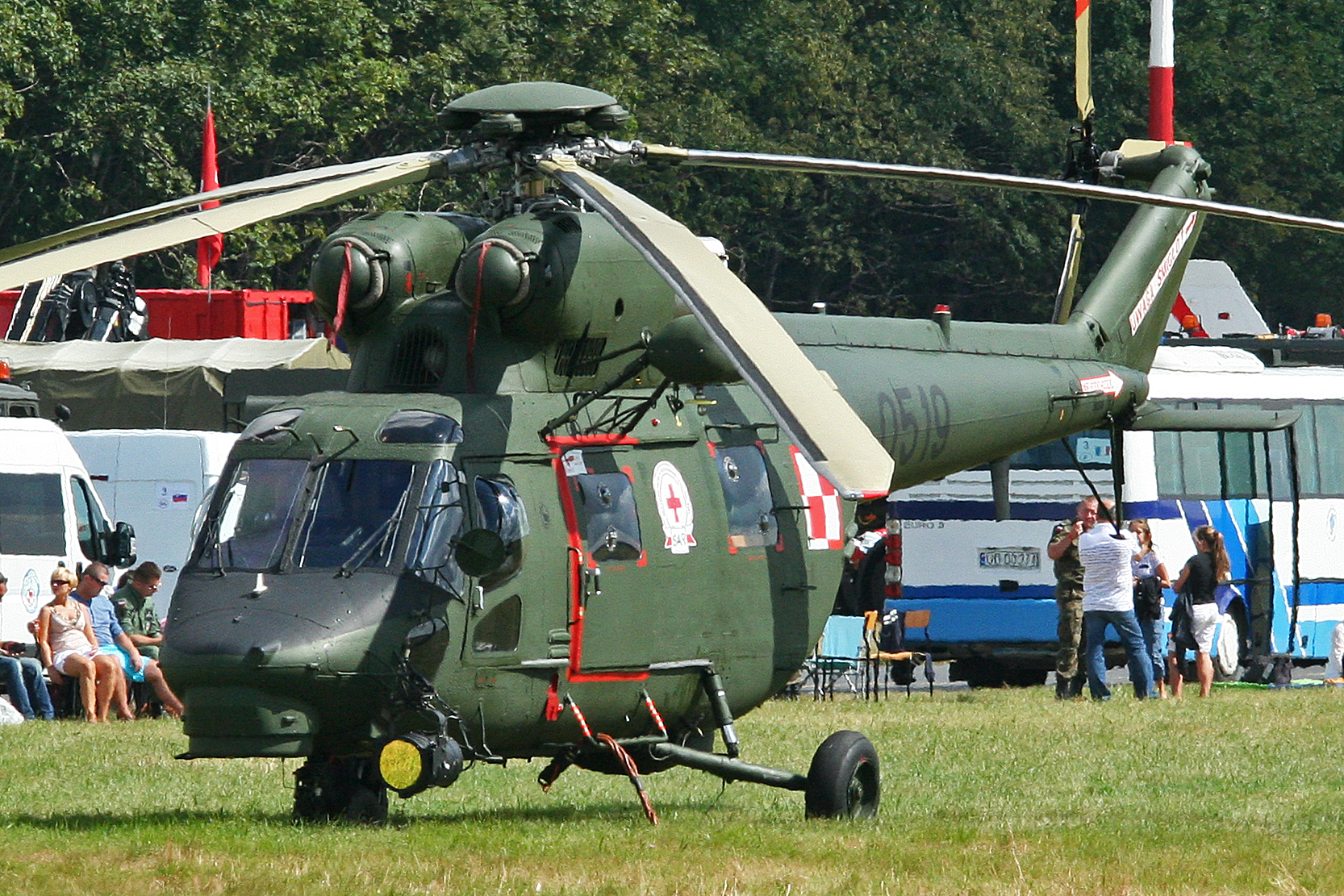
PZL-Świdnik W-3RL Sokół 0519

The city is home to Avia Świdnik, a sports club, which independently runs two departments – men's football and men's volleyball.

== Notable people ==
- Mateusz Kochalski (born 2000), Polish professional football player
