= Zemborzyce Dolne =

- Village
- Location within Poland
- Coordinates: 51°11′N 22°28′E
- Country: Poland
- Voivodeship: Lublin
- County: Lublin
- Gmina: Konopnica

Zemborzyce Dolne [zɛmbɔˈʐɨt͡sɛ ˈdɔlnɛ] is a village in the administrative district of Gmina Konopnica, within Lublin County, Lublin Voivodeship, in eastern Poland.
