= Konopnica, Lublin Voivodeship =

Konopnica
- Village
- Location within Poland
- Coordinates: 51°13′36″N 22°17′29″E
- Country: Poland
- Voivodeship: Lublin
- County: Lublin
- Gmina: Konopnica

Population
  - Total: 740

Konopnica [kɔnɔpˈnit͡sa] is a village in Lublin County, Lublin Voivodeship, in eastern Poland. It is the seat of the gmina (administrative district) called Gmina Konopnica.
