= Tereszyn =

- Village
- Location within Poland
- Coordinates: 51°12′N 22°25′E
- Country: Poland
- Voivodeship: Lublin
- County: Lublin
- Gmina: Konopnica

Tereszyn [tɛˈrɛʂɨn] is a village in the administrative district of Gmina Konopnica, within Lublin County, Lublin Voivodeship, in eastern Poland.
