= Zemborzyce Tereszyńskie =

- Village
- Location within Poland
- Coordinates: 51°11′48″N 22°26′23″E
- Country: Poland
- Voivodeship: Lublin
- County: Lublin
- Gmina: Konopnica

Population (2021)
  - Total: 590

Zemborzyce Tereszyńskie [zɛmbɔˈʐɨt͡sɛ tɛrɛˈʂɨɲskʲɛ] is a village in the administrative district of Gmina Konopnica, within Lublin County, Lublin Voivodeship, in eastern Poland.
