= Vistula Railway =

The Vistula Railway (Polish: Kolej Nadwiślańska) was a railroad system, opened on August 17, 1877. It ran from northwest to southeast, through the territory of the former Congress Poland, known after the November Uprising as Privislinsky Krai (part of the Russian Empire). It was, upon construction, the longest railroad in the Congress Poland.

Starting in Mława, which back then was located near the border with the German Empire, the connection ran through Ciechanów, Warsaw, Dęblin, Lublin, and Chełm, to the strategic railroad junction of Kovel (now Ukraine). In Mława, the system reached the Prussian railway network, as the nearby German border station of Działdowo (Soldau) was another important junction, with connections to Gdańsk (Danzig), Olsztyn (Allenstein), and Toruń (Thorn).

Altogether, the length of the system was 522 kilometers, and originally, it was a broad gauge line. In 1887, the Vistula River Railroad employed 2364 workers. During the World War II (1939) the railroad was partitioned forming the Soviet Kovel Railways as one of its successors. In 1953 Kovel Railways were merged with Lviv Railways.

Lublin Station still has the original main station building dating from 1877 (though rebuilt in the 1920s), which opened together with the railroad and is well preserved to this day.

== See also ==
- History of rail transport in Poland
