= Radawiec Duży =

- Village
- Location within Poland
- Coordinates: 51°12′N 22°24′E
- Country: Poland
- Voivodeship: Lublin
- County: Lublin
- Gmina: Konopnica

Population
  - Total: 1,300

Radawiec Duży [raˈdavjɛt͡s ˈduʐɨ] is a village in the administrative district of Gmina Konopnica, within Lublin County, Lublin Voivodeship, in eastern Poland.
