= Gmina Konopnica, Lublin Voivodeship =

Gmina Konopnica Konopnica Commune
- Gmina
- Coat of arms
- Interactive map of Gmina Konopnica
- Coordinates (Konopnica): 51°13′36″N 22°17′29″E
- Country: Poland
- Voivodeship: Lublin
- County: Lublin County
- Seat: Konopnica

Area
  - Total: 92.75 km^{2} (35.81 sq mi)

Population (2019)
  - Total: 13,963
  - Density: 150.5/km^{2} (389.9/sq mi)
- Website: http://www.konopnica.lubelskie.pl

Gmina Konopnica is a rural gmina (administrative district) in Lublin County, Lublin Voivodeship, in eastern Poland. Its seat is the village of Konopnica, which lies approximately 20 kilometres (12 mi) west of the regional capital Lublin.

The gmina covers an area of 92.75 square kilometres (35.8 sq mi), and as of 2019 its total population is 13,963 (12,790 in 2013).

Konopnica is a suburban borough of Lublin, some 10 km to the south west of the town. When driving from the town, one can see the changes on the landscape from an urban agglomeration, through estates of single-family houses and, finally, to the typically Polish countryside of golden fields and green meadows.

The borough of Konopnica is made up of 20 villages and hamlets, in which, within an area of 92.75 km^{2}, live over 10,000 people. Half of the inhabitants live off farming; almost three-quarters of the land in the borough is agricultural. Mainly cereals and sugar beet are grown. The location provides good conditions for development of trade and services. A good road network ensures communications with Lublin. The Lublin-Warsaw railway line, which runs through the borough, increases the transportation possibilities.

The railway runs along the border between two distinct geographical areas. The area to the north of railway line on the Nałęczowski Plateau which is characterised by a richly sculpted terrain.

In this part of the borough can be found the highest point in the Lublin, at a height of 252 m above sea level, and a network of picturesque loess ravines.

Stretching away on the other side of the railway line is the Bełżycka Plain. The Flat plain full of large fields and meadows offers views of the most distant parts of the borough.

There are two large forests in the borough at Radawiec Duży and Tereszyn, as well as some smaller woods with a total area of over 5 km^{2}.

== History ==
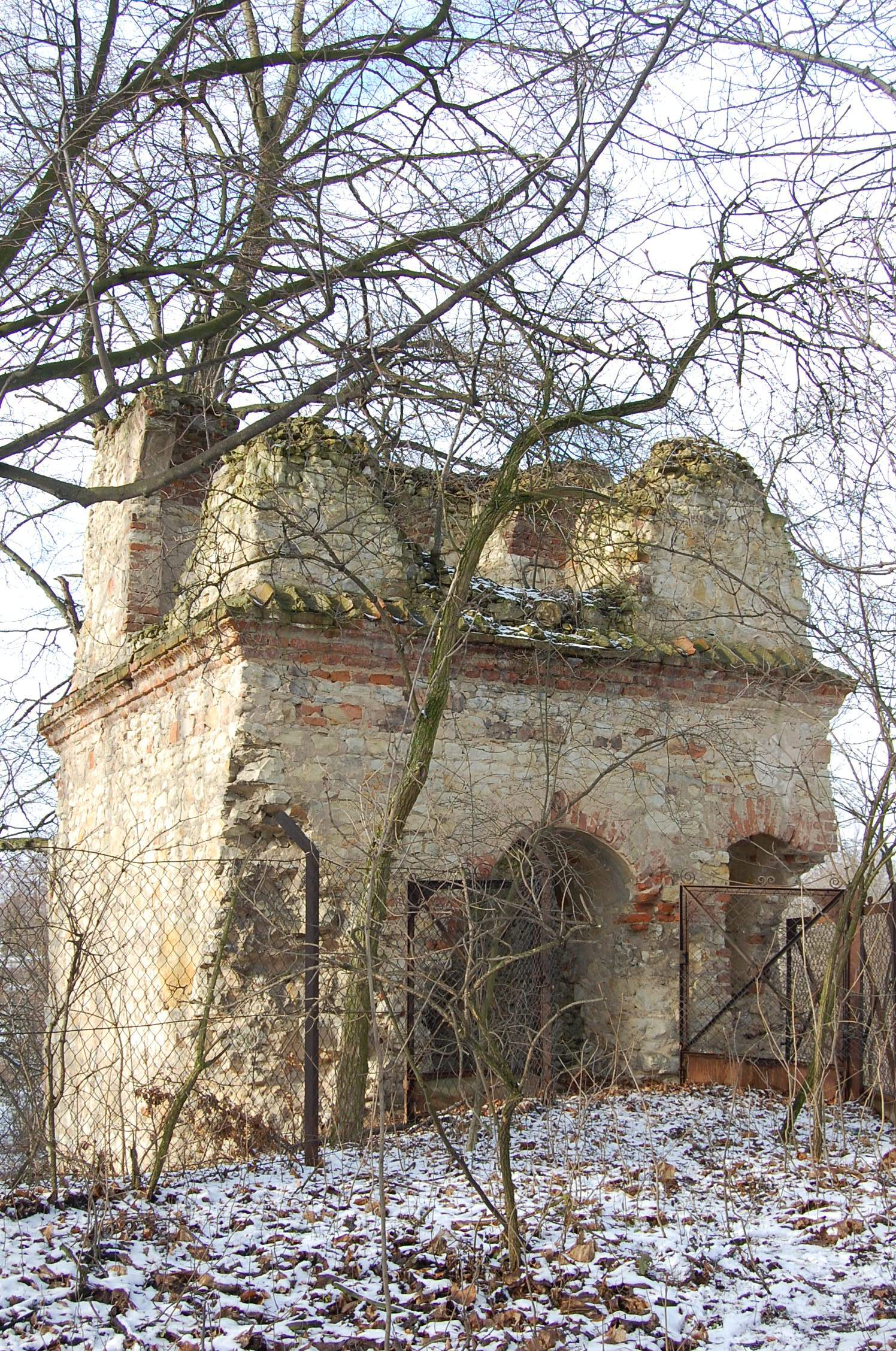
Belfry from the mid-17th century in Konopnica

Slav settlements existed in this area in the early Middle Ages. Archaeological digs carried out in the 1980s confirm this.

During the first half of the 14th century Motycz was one of the more important places in the Lublin area, lying on the main trading route to Russia, while during the second half of the 14th century, that role was being fulfilled by Konopnica. The first reports about the place are from 1342 - Konopnica was at that time a royal village and its today is reflected in the borough's coat of arms.

In 1400 the chronicles of Jan Długosz mention the church at "Conopnicza", a wooden temple dedicated to St. Katarzyna. Today in its place stants a brick-built church dating back the beginning of the 20th century.

The rich history of the borough is also reflected by places such as the Swedish military cemetery in Motycz Leśny; "Castle Hill" in Motycz or the lime tree under which Napoleon rested during his march on Russia. The place and the park in Motycz have also been preserved, as well as a fragment of the place park in Radawiec. The railway station in Motycz, which is over 100 years old, is listed in the register of historic buildings.

== Neighbouring gminas ==
Gmina Konopnica is bordered by the city of Lublin and by the gminas of Bełżyce, Jastków, Niedrzwica Duża and Wojciechów.
