= Construction in Process =

20th-century artist collective

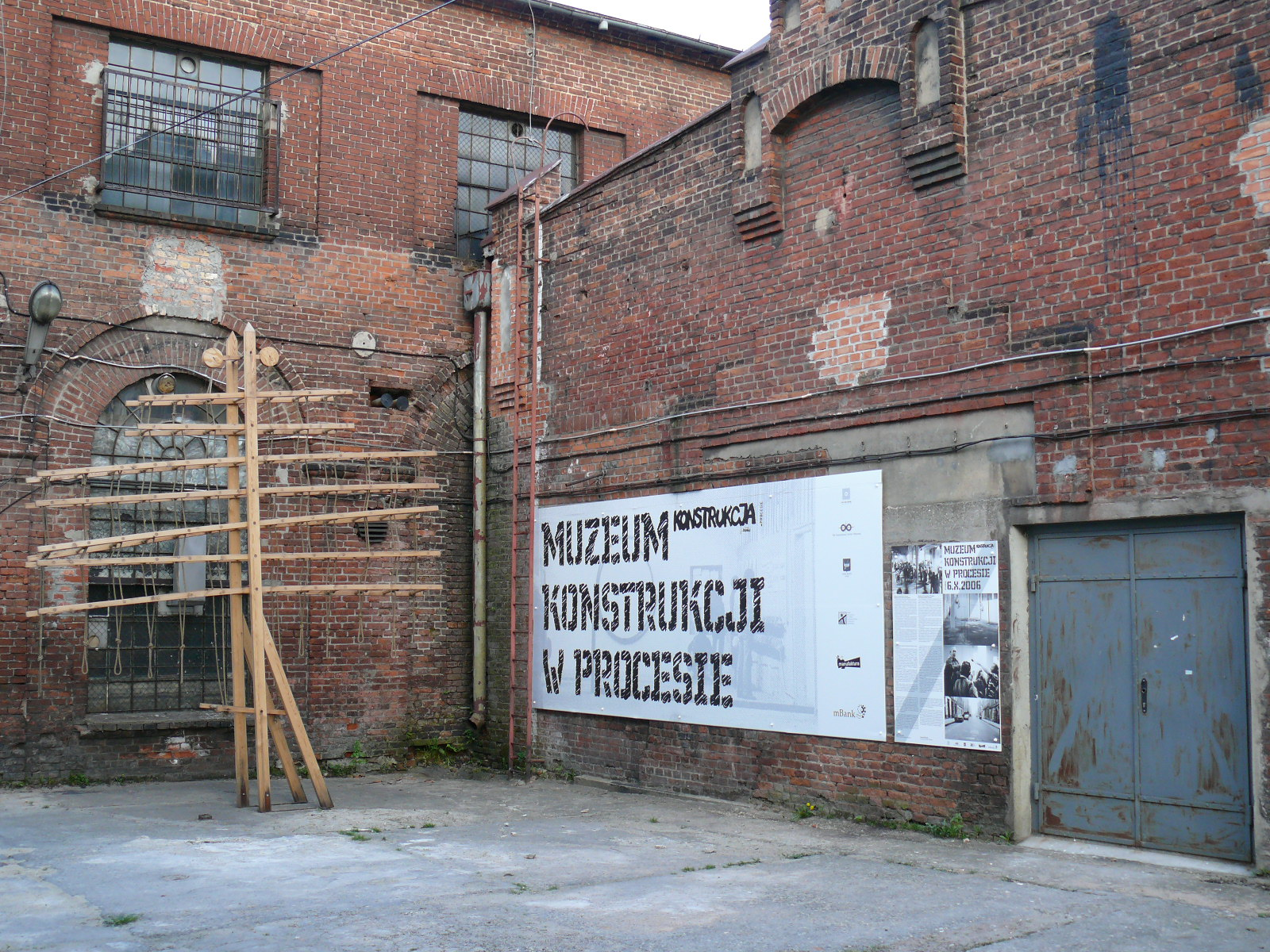
Artists Museum Construction in Process, Tylna Street, Lodz, Poland

Construction in Process (Polish: Konstrukcja w Procesie) was a series of international global exhibitions organized by artists in the 1980s and 1990s. The originator of this project was Polish artist Ryszard Wasko. Artists who were invited to participate in "Construction in Process" invite in turn, another group of participants, giving the project a dynamic, open character. Another original idea was to spur the artists to create their works on site.

== Construction in Process I ==
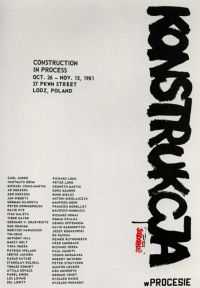
Construction in Process, poster from the exhibition held in Lodz

The first CiP was titled, "The Community That Came?" (1981), curated by Anna Saciuk-Gąsowska and Aleksandra Jach and took place in Łódź, Poland. It was symbolic as the birth of the Polish Solidarity movement.

Participants

- Carl Andre
- Patrick Ireland
- Richard Nonas
- Hartmut Boehm
- Servie Janssen
- Roman Opałka
- Michael Craig-Martin
- Kazuo Katase
- Dennis Oppenheim
- Ad Dekkers
- Stanislav Kolibal
- David Rabinowitch
- Ger Dekkers
- Tomasz Konart
- Jozef Robakowski
- Jan Dibbets
- Attila Kovacs
- Ed Ruscha
- Norman Dilworth
- Pawel Kwiek
- Reiner Ruthenbeck
- Peter Downsborough
- Les Levine
- Fred Sandback
- David Dye
- Sol LeWitt
- Richard Serra
- Ivan Galeta
- Richard Long
- Paul Sharits
- Tibor Gayor
- Peter Lowe
- Yoshio Shirakawa
- Gerhard V. Graevenitz
- Kenneth Martin
- Robert Smithson
- Dan Graham
- Dóra Maurer
- Peter Struycken
- Noriyuki Haraguchi
- Rune Mields
- Gunter Uecker
- Tim Head
- Antoni Mikolajczyk
- Ken Unsworth
- Anthony Hill
- Manfred Mohr
- Bernar Venet
- Nancy Holt
- François Morellet
- Ryszard Wasko
- Taka Iimura
- Maurizio Nannucci
- Ryszard Winiarski

== Process und Konstruktion - Construction in Process II ==
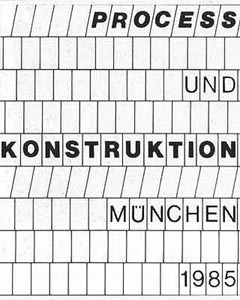
poster from the second edition

The second edition took place in Munich, Germany in 1985, organized by Ryszard Wasko. It was created in response to the Berlin Wall, to form a cultural bridge between east and west.

Participants

- Norman Dilworth
- Sjoerd Buisman
- François Morellet
- Peter Downsborough
- Rebecca Horn
- Didier Vermeiren
- Kazuo Katase
- Yutaka Matsuzawa
- Ben Vautier
- Tomasz Konart
- Janusz Baldyga
- Erika Kiffl
- Les Levine
- Vito Acconci
- Roger Welch
- Sol LeWitt
- Charles Gaines
- Pat Steir
- Rune Mields
- Gunter Demnig
- Michael Witlatschil
- Antoni Mikolajczyk
- Halina Jaworski
- Ansgar Nierhoff
- Maurizio Nannucci
- Joseph Kosuth
- Massimo Nannucci
- Richard Nonas
- Tom Bills
- Hanne Tierney
- Roman Opalka
- Robert Ryman
- Joel Shapiro
- Fred Sandback
- Daniel Buren
- Paul Gees
- Richard Serra
- Steven Keister
- Ryszard Wasko
- Ugo Dossi
- Daniel Spoerri
- Lawrence Weiner
- Albert Mertz
- Ryszard Winiarski
- Hartmut Bohm
- Ewerdt Hilgemann

== International Artists' Museum ==
In 1989, the International Artists' Museum with an international artists' board and Emmett Williams as president has been established in Poland, and other countries around the world. The Łódź Biennale is an international art celebration that is managed and supervised by the International Artists' Museum, the event was founded in 2004 and based on ideas developed during Construction in Process events.

== Back in Łódź - Construction in Process III ==
The third edition was organized in 1990 in Łódź.

Participants

- Marcela Anselmetti
- Rolf Julius
- Daniel Reynolds
- Ilan Averbuch
- Wolf Kahlen
- Rafael Rheinsberg
- Janusz Baldyga
- Elzbieta Kalinowska
- Jozef Robakowski
- Reiner Barzen
- Andromahi Kefalos
- Ingrid Roscheck
- Terry Berkowitz
- Edmund Kieselbach
- Nicolas Rowan
- Tom Bills
- Marek Kijewski
- Karin Sander
- Monika Brandmeier
- Adam Klimczak
- Anthony Sansotta
- Jean Pierre Brigaudiot
- Svetlana Kopystiansky
- Igor Kopystiansky
- Eva Maria Schon
- Wojciech Bruszewski
- Philip Smith
- Hartmut Boehm
- Anna Kutera
- Mikolaj Smoczynski
- Peter D'Adostino
- Romuald Kutera
- Eric Snell
- Jacqueline Dauriac
- Emma J. Lawton
- Michael Snow
- Barco Dimitrijevic
- Edward Łazikowski
- Pawel Sobczak
- Peter Downsborough
- Les Levine
- Marek Sobczyk
- Kristian Dubbick
- Sol LeWitt
- Ann Thulin
- Bernd Eickhorst
- Emilio Lopez-Menchero
- Hanne Tierney
- Wendy Elliott
- Milovan Destil Markovic
- Sissel Tolaas
- Lilli Engel
- Jonas Mekas
- Francesc Torres
- Gene Flores
- Rune Mields
- Tout
- Michael Galasso
- Antoni Mikolajczyk
- Endre Tot
- Klaus Geldmacher
- Teresa Murak
- Dagmar Uhde
- Jochen Gerz
- Giovanni Nicolini
- Micha Ullman
- Leszek Golec
- John Nixon
- Ken Unsworth
- Jerzy Grzegorski
- Richard Nonas
- Ian Wallace
- Ryszard Grzyb
- Ann Noel
- Maria Wasko
- Marcia Hafif
- Dennis Oppenheim
- Ryszard Wasko
- Tadashi Hashimoto
- Erick Oppenheim
- Lawrence Weiner
- Wolfgang Hainke
- Paul Panhuysen
- Emmet Williams
- Marygold Hodkinson
- Luigi Pasotelli
- Xawery Wolski
- Alexander Honory
- Beverly Piersol
- Brigida Wrobel-Kulik
- Peter Hutchinson
- Anna Plotnicka
- Marthe Wery
- Taka Iimura
- David Rabinowitch
- Sofia Zezmer
- Jean Luc Jehan
- Margaret Raspe

== My Home is Your Home - Construction in Process IV ==
In 1993, the fourth edition, "My Home is Your Home" took place at the International Artists' Museum in Łódź.

Participants

- Peter Akfen
- Driss Sans Arcidet
- Sam Auinger
- Ay-O
- Su Baker
- Iwan Bala
- Krzysztof Bednarski
- Emilie Benes-Brzezinski
- Barbara Benish
- Tom Bills
- Andrea Blum
- Hartmut Boehm
- Jean-Pierre Brigaudiot
- Jurgen Brockmann
- Brad Buckley
- Lillian Budd
- Mimmo Catania
- Xang-Jie Chang
- Igor Chatskin
- Henning Christiansen
- Krzysztof Cichosz
- Jean Clareboudt
- Wojciech Czajkowski
- Carsten Dane
- Marta Deskur
- Peter Downsborough
- Richard Dunn
- Daniel Dutrieux
- Elena Elagina
- Marianne Eigenheer
- Andrey Filippow
- Dieter Froese
- Bernhard Garbert
- Jarg Geismar
- Allen Ginsberg
- Janusz Glowacki
- Toni Grand
- Kenneth Goldsmith
- Wenda Gu
- Marcia Hafif
- Amy Hauft
- Robin Hill
- Jusuf Hadzifejzofic
- Helen Mayer and Newton Harrison
- Sibylle Hofter
- Tom Homburg
- Sharon Horvath
- Jean-Luc Jehan
- Marek Janiak
- Andrzej Janaszewski
- Zhu Jinshi
- Sven-Ake Johansson
- Joan Jonas
- Helen Jones
- Laszlo Kerekes
- Yuiji Kitagawa
- Nazzih Khire
- Kay Kruger-Moths
- Wlodzimierz Ksiazek
- Harald Kubiczak
- Ewa Kulasek
- Tilman Kuentzel
- Eve Andree Laramee
- Emma J. Lawton
- Cecile Le Talec
- Richard Lerman
- Philis Levin
- Sol LeWitt
- LODZ FABRYCZNA GROUP
- Marcia Lyons
- Russel Lynch
- Christian Marclay
- Igor Makarevich
- Jean-Charles Massera
- Vusisizwe Mchunu
- Christoph Meier
- Harry Miller
- Antoni Muntadas
- Rune Mields
- Robert C. Morgan
- Tracy Morris and Paul Brewer
- Markus Mussinghoff
- Benno Mutter
- David Nash
- Joshua Neustein
- Malgorzata Niedzielko
- Ann Noel
- Richard Nonas
- NOTORIOUS GROUP
- Mordechai Omer
- Dennis Oppenheim
- Erik Oppenheim
- Sean O'Reilly
- Yigal Ozeri
- Mark Palmer
- Paul Panhuysen
- Matthew Partridge
- Tadeusz Piechura
- Vera Pogodina
- Joanna Przybyla
- R.H. Quaytman
- Yufen Qin
- Josef Ramaseder
- Philip Rantzer
- Michal Rovner
- Laurenee Laure and Jean-Christophe Royoux
- Patricia Ruiz-Bayon
- Robert Rumas
- Carl Rudiger
- Karin Sander
- Anthony Sansotta
- Gunnar Schmidt
- Buky Schwartz
- Roland Schefferski
- Glen Seator
- Judith Shea
- Seiji Shimoda
- Yuan Shun
- Christopher Snee
- Ronny Someck
- Suzy Sureck
- Maciej Toporowicz
- Nicholas Tsoutas
- Stuart Sherman
- Dagmar Uhde
- Francesc Torres
- Micha Ullman
- Ken Unsworth
- Hendri van der Putten
- Peter Vermeulen
- Henk Visch
- Gregory Volk
- David Wakstein
- Ryszard Wasko
- Jenny Watson
- James Welling
- Lawrence Weiner
- Kees Wevers
- Allan Wexler
- Emmett Williams
- Ryszard Winiarski
- Michael Witlatschil
- Jack Whitten
- Lynne Yamamoto
- Adem Yilmaz
- Harumi Yonekawa
- Sofia Zezmer
- Jian-Jun Zhang
- Konstantin Zvezdochatov

== Co-existence - Construction in Process V ==
The desert Negev in Israel was the venue of the fifth CiP in 1995. The name "Co-Existence" or "Dukium" was created to coincide with the Israeli–Palestinian peace process.

- Marina Abramović
- Yael Amzaleg
- Ilan Averbuch
- Josefina Aerza
- Sam Bachrach
- Amnon Barzel
- Sarah Bayliss
- Elena Beriollo
- Tom Bills
- Hannes Boringer
- Sarah Birghberg
- Marianne Brouwer
- Emilie Bennes-Brzezinski
- Rana Bishara
- Malgorzata Borek
- Miriam Tovia Boneh
- Hartmut Boehm
- Monika Brandmeier
- Brad Buckley
- Mimmo Catania
- Yaacov Chefitz
- Charile Citron
- Lech Czolnowski
- Hayek Dauod
- Michael Delmi
- Agnes Denes
- Owen Drolet
- Zbigniew Dudek
- Orna Elstein
- Betu Simon Fainaru
- Dave Fasvoldt
- Wojtek Filipczak
- David Fagel
- Craig Fischer
- Regina Frank
- Alexandra Funk
- Martina Galvin
- Tslbi Geva
- Gideon Gechtman
- Jarg Geismar
- David Ginton
- Zarmuch Gilad
- Isaac Golombeck
- Eles De Groot
- Wenda Gu
- Jerzy Grzegorski
- Janusz Glowacki
- Marcia Hafif
- Paula Halwani
- Pawel Hartman
- Frederika Holt
- Jusuf Hadzifejzovic
- Oliver Herring
- Jessica Higgins
- Henry Philip Israel
- Amad Kanaan
- Laszlo Kerekes
- Daniel Kish
- Adam Klimczak
- Erika Knerr
- Alison Knowles
- Igor Kopystiansky
- Svetlana Kopystiansky
- Hana Kofler
- Anette Kovacs
- Loraine Kordecki
- Wlodzimierz Ksiazek
- Piotr Kurka
- Eve Andree Laramee
- Emme Lawton
- Sol LeWitt
- Arye Bar-Lev
- Russel Maltz
- Margalit Mannor
- Jenny Marketou
- Tomasz Matuszak
- Agata Michowska
- Robert C. Morgan
- Solfrid Mortensen
- Grzegorz Musial
- Markus Mussingfoll
- Beno Mutter
- Dominique Nahas
- Joshua Neustein
- Ann Noel
- Gideon Ofraf
- John O'Mara
- Dennis Oppenheim
- Yigal Oyeri
- Tamar Raban
- Lee Ramon
- Eli Ran
- Philip Rantzer
- Talia Rapaport
- Revina Regev
- Osvaldo Romberg
- Ayala Rom
- Michel Rovner
- Raphael Rubinstein
- Jack Sal
- Eva-Maria Schoen
- Glen Seator
- Bucky Schwartz
- Joshua Selman
- Arik Shapira
- Tamar Sharon
- Christopher Snee
- Gita Snee
- Malgorzata Sidor
- Ronny Somek
- Mariusz Soltysik
- Angelika Stepken
- Haim Steinbach
- Levia Stern
- Suzy Sureck
- Richard R. Thomas
- Danny Tisdale
- Maciej Toporowicz
- Dean Jokanovic-Toumin
- Susan Reimer Torn
- Dagmar Uhde
- Micha Ullman
- Vulto
- Gregory Volk
- Sharif Waked
- David Wakstein
- Maria wasko
- Lucja wasko
- Ryszard Wasko
- Alan wexler
- Emmett Williams
- Richard Wilson
- Adam Yilmaz
- Sophia Zezmer
- Baruch Zilbershats

== The Bridge - Construction in Process VI ==
In 1998, the sixth edition was organized in Melbourne, Australia.

Participants

- Ay-O
- Marcus Bergner
- Wendy Berick
- Lauren Berkowitz
- Tom Bills
- Hartmut Böhm
- Montien Boonma
- Małgorzata Borek
- Joan Brassil
- Tim Burns
- Karen Casey with Tim Cole
- Krzysztof Cichosz
- Henning Christensen
- Charlie Citron
- David Cranswick
- Maria Cruz
- Nick Curmi
- DAMP
- Domenico de Clario
- Agnes Denes
- Cor Dera
- Gu Dexin
- Anita Dube
- Avraham Eilat
- Martina Galvin
- Jårg Geismar
- Guillermo Gonzalez
- Ann Graham
- Jerzy Grzegorski
- Philip Gudthaykudthay
- Edgar Harris
- Paweł Hartman
- Romuald Hazoume
- Binghui Huangfu
- Andrzej Janczewski
- Magdalena Jetelova
- Wolf Kahlen
- Oki Kano
- Fassih Keiso
- Dok Hi Kim
- Adam Klimczak
- Maureen Lander
- Sol LeWitt
- Mary Longman
- Rita McBride
- Alastair MacLennan
- Anna MacLeod
- Andrew Margululu
- Dhuwarrwarr Marika
- Tomasz Matuszak
- Dominique Mazeaud
- Peter Minygulu
- Markus Mussinghof
- Michael Nicholls
- John Nixon
- Ann Noël
- Bjørn Nørgaard
- Jittima Pholsawek
- Grzegorz Pleszyński
- Kerrie Poliness
- Kim Power
- Josef Ramaseder
- Alwin Reamillo
- Józef Robakowski
- Cameron Robbins
- Lisa Roet
- Sabine Russ
- Mmakgabo Mmapula Helen Sebidi
- William Seeto
- Josh Selman
- Paco Simon
- Tex Skuthorpe
- Christopher Snee
- Mariusz Sołtysik
- Mark Stoner
- Suzy Sureck
- Jon Tarry
- Neil Taylor
- Martine Pascale Tayou
- Ken Thaiday Snr
- David Hugh Thomas
- Dagmar Uhde
- Micha Ullman
- M. S. Umesh
- Albertina Viegas
- Laura Vinci
- Milos Vojtechovsky
- Gregory Volk
- Peter Walsh
- Maria Wasko
- Ryszard Wasko
- Wastijn & Deschuymer
- David Waters
- Naup Waup
- Lee Wen
- Emmett Williams
- Ah Xian
- Djalinda Yunupingu

== This Earth is a Flower - Construction in Process VII ==
In 2000, the last Construction in Process was held at the Regional Museum, Bydgoszcz in Bydgoszcz, Poland.

Participants

- Maria Thereza Alves
- Katherine Armstrong
- John Axon
- Siarzuk Baberka
- Janusz Baldyga
- Barbara Benish
- Maricn Berdyszak
- Elena Berriolo
- Mauro Bianchi
- Tom Bills
- Vladimir Biritski
- Margret Blondal
- Hartmut Böhm
- Monika Brandmeier
- Slawomir Brzoska
- Steve Buchanan
- Chandrasekaran S.
- Yaacov Chefetz
- Amarit Chusuwan
- Andrzej Ciesielski
- Mark Daniel Cohen
- Sylvie Courvoisier
- Witosław Czerwonka
- Vlasta Delimar
- Gunter Demnig
- Agnes Denes
- Tomasz Domański
- Peter Downsbrough
- Jacquie Dunn
- Jimmie Durham
- Barbara Edelstein
- Avram Eilat
- Tory Fair
- Jens Fånge
- Emilio Fantin
- Fred Firth
- Vadim Fishkin
- Gideon Gechtman
- John Gian
- Aleksandra Gieraga
- Matthew Gold
- Michael Goldberg
- Eugenia Gortchakova
- Lorenna Grant
- Izabella Gustowska
- Anne Graham
- Tadashi Hashimoto
- Romuald Hazoume
- Ulrike Hein
- Joanna Hoffmann
- Elżbieta Jabłońska
- Randy Jewart
- Joan Jonas
- Liliana Kadichevski
- Ahmad Kanaan
- Oki Kano
- Fassih Keiso
- Sora Kim
- Grzegorz Klaman
- Piotr Kurka
- Konrad Kuzyszyn
- Aleh Ladislau
- Algis Lankelis
- Via Levandovsky
- Vitaly Levchenya
- Les Levine
- Alicja Lewicka
- Oleg Ladysow
- Ivan Macha
- Brian Maguire
- Vlado Martek
- Antoni Maznevski
- Josiah McElheny
- Shirley Meshulam
- Robert C. Morgan
- Ikue Mori
- Florian Mutschler
- Anna Myca
- Warren Niesluchowski
- Ann Noël
- Richard Nonas
- Jüri Ojaver
- Dennis Oppenheim
- Ben Patterson
- Dorota Podlaska
- Doron Polak
- Grzegorz Pleszyński
- Steven Rand
- Dodi Reifneberg
- Daniel Reynolds
- Józef Robakowski
- Paul Rodgers
- Jon Rose
- Andreas Roth
- Sabine Russ
- Zygmunt Rytka
- Jack Sal
- Karin Sander
- Annika Carmen Schmidt
- William Seeto
- Michal Sedaka
- Christopher Snee
- Paco Simon
- Anatol Stepanenko
- Jon Tarry
- Pascale M. Tayou
- Richard Thomas
- Maciek Toporowicz
- Yvonne Troxler
- Dagmar Uhde
- M.S. Umesh
- R.H. Quaytman
- Cedomir Vasic
- Albertina Viegas
- Richard Vine
- Gregory Volk
- Sharif Waked
- Regina Walter
- Ryszard Wasko
- Jürgen Weichardt
- Lilly Wei
- Kirsten Weiner
- Lawrence Weiner
- Emmett Williams
- Jeanne Wilkinson
- Mike Wodkowski
- Gary Woodley
- Lynn Yamamoto
- Wojciech Zamiara
- Jian-Jun Zhang
