= Terry Berkowitz =

American video artist

- Born: Brooklyn, NY
- Education: School of Visual Arts, School of the Art Institute of Chicago
- Known for: Photography, Installation Art, Multimedia Installation, Video Art, Sound Art

Terry Berkowitz (born Brooklyn, New York) creates installations, videos, photography, audio and objects dealing with social and political critique, social consciousness and the human condition. Beginning in the early seventies, she has shown in museums, biennials and other institutions internationally including PS1 (Long Island City), the Whitney Museum of American Art (NY), First International Biennial of Contemporary Art of Cartagena de Indias (Colombia) The Alternative Museum (NY), Boca Raton Museum of Art, Contemporary Arts Museum (Houston) and Metrònom (Barcelona), Museo do Pobo Galego (Santiago de Compostela)

== Work ==
She began her professional career with public works in urbanscapes (Ch go and New York) and short films reflecting on sociological issues. Her first installation, 12 Hours of Territorial Intrusion, was created for Lives, an exhibition curated by Jeffrey Deitch at the Fine Arts Building in 1975. This was a photo/audio installation about personal space and the city, reflecting on the urban environment.

Working mainly with the installation format over the last few decades, she utilizes whatever media best serves the content of the work blending sculptural elements, audio, slide projections, film projections, photography and/or video. The content of the works includes subjects as varied as rape and its resonances in women's lives, forced expulsions around the world, the lives of the Palestinians under occupation, the reality of life in refugee camps in Western Sahara, the Inquisition, terrorism, identity and other social and political themes. The works often include interviews as a main component. Recently, she has been exploring photographic installation (The Malaya Lola Project, Is This Where My Family Lived?, the ongoing and as yet untitled Western Sahara portrait series) and single-channel videos (Cuarenta, How the Other Half Lives). Berkowitz has also worked in collaboration with several other artists including Pawel Wojtasik (Three Chimneys, a video); Francesc Torres (Parabola da Abundáncia/The Tale of Plenty, a project at the Museo do Pobo Galego, 2017); and Karla Sachse, DDR and Varsha Nair, India/Thailand, (Barriers and Beyond, a video).

Her research has taken her to places where people are living in dire conditions or have suffered through history including Gaza and the West Bank, the Strait of Gibraltar, the Philippines and the Western Sahara refugee camps near Tindouf, Algeria. In 1996–7, she became a Fulbright Senior Scholar and spent six months in Spain researching homes of Arabs and Jews who had been expelled five hundred years prior. This has led to an almost 20-year investigation into the subjects of forced expulsion, diaspora and the Inquisition. To date, she has realized several works dealing with this topic including Veil of Memory. Prologue: The Last Supper (Metrònom in Barcelona, 1995; the First Biennial of Cartagena de Indias, Colombia, 2014 and the Boca Raton Museum of Art in Florida, 2015).

Since 1996, she has been a Professor of Art at Bernard M. Baruch College of the City University of New York. She became a Fulbright Scholar in 1996.

== Grants ==
Research Foundation Grants, PSC/CUNY, 1993, 1996, 1998, 1999, 2001, 2005, 2006, 2008, 2012, 2014, 2016

Jerome Foundation Video Production Grant: 1996, 1990

2010 Artists Fellowship in Photography, New York Foundation for the Arts (NYFA)

2007 Individual Artists Grant, New Media, New York State Council on the Arts (NYSCA)

2007 Silverlens Foundation Finishing Grant, Manila, Philippines

1996 Fulbright Scholars Senior Research Fellowship

1993 Women's Research and Development Fund Award, CUNY

1992 Harvestworks/Studio PASS, Artist in Residence

1989 MacDowell Colony Fellow

1985 Montclair State College, Research Grant for Video Project

1978 ZBS Foundation, Artist in Residence

1974 Creative Arts in Public Service (C.A.P.S.) and National Endowment for the Arts (NEA), Individual Artist Fellowship

== Selected bibliography ==
- Ahlberg, Brian. Review, “On Art and the Rosenberg Era”, Artpaper, Volume 8, No. 5, Minneapolis, Minn., January, 1989.
- Bard, Perry, “Negotiating Time: DIVA Art Fair”, Afterimage, May–June 2005, Vol. 32, No. 6, p. 14-15.
- Biscarri, I.. Review, "El Sueño Imperative: Arte Radical", El Dia, Zaragoza, Spain, February 3, 1991.
- Bosco, Roberta. Review, “El viaje de la memoria”, El Periodico del Arte, Madrid, November 1999, p. 20.
- Boyle, Wickham. Review, “The Rosenbergs and the Post-9/11Era”, Downtown Express, New York, July 1-7, 2003, p. 26.
- Buitrago, Rocío. Article, “Terry Berkowitz: Mis obras son collages de gran tamaño y en cuatro dimensiones (My works are large scale collages in three dimensions)”, El Correo de Andalucia, June 11, 1997, p. 50.
- Cantor, Judy. Review, “El Sueño Imperativo”, Art News, May, 1991, p. 164.
- Cramer, Sue. Review, “Report From Poland, Back to the Future”, Art in America, March 1991, pp. 65–71.
- Frank, Peter. Review, Village Voice, New York, NY.**, May, 1978.
- Hess, Elizabeth. “Presumed Guilty”, review, Village Voice, September 27, 1988, pp. 99–100.
- Jun, Mizukami. FAIN, IQ Issue No. 2, Nagoya, Japan, 1977.
- Levin, Kim, Voice Choice, Village Voice, May 24, 1994, p. 71.
- Martínez Ribas, Inés. Review, “La Veu del sefardites de La Diáspora”, Avui, Barcelona, Spain, October 8, 1999, p. 25.
- Murphy, Jay. Review, Tema Celeste, New York, NY.**, Autumn 1992, p. 94.
- Naval, Francisco X. Review https://www.lavozdegalicia.es/noticia/cultura/2017/07/31/abundancia-parabola/0003_201707G31P29991.htm
- Nonas, Richard. Review, “Construction in Process”,Tema Celeste, March–April 1991, pp. 91–92.
- Paoletti, John T. Review, “At the Edge Where Art Becomes Media and Message Becomes Polemic: Disinformation at the Alternative Museum”, Arts Magazine, May, 1985.
- Peris, Pedro. Article, “Arte e Actitude”, O Tempo, São Paulo, Brazil, July 13, 2003.
- Pincus, Robert L. Review, “Images of Beauty, Beastliness”, Cleveland Plain Dealer, December 1997, pp. 1E, 6E.
- Princenthal, Nancy. Review, Artist's Book Beat, The Print Collector’s Newsletter, Vol. XXII, No. 1, March–April, 1992, p. 30.
- Rand, Carol. Review, “Future Histories: The Impact of Changing Technology”, New Art Examiner, Vol.13, No.7, March 1985, p. 55.
- Rice, Shelley. Review, ArtForum, New York, NY.**, December, 1980.
- “Photographic Installation: An Overview”, SF Camerawork, Volume 12, No. 1, San Francisco, Ca., Spring 1985, pp. 4–5.
- Sargent Wooster, Ann. Review, “Manhattan Shortcuts”, AfterImage, Volume13, No.1 and 2, Rochester, N.Y., Summer 1985, pp. 35–36.
- Salisbury, Stephan. Review, “The Rosenberg Case Turned into Art”, The Philadelphia Inquirer, March 26, 1989.
- Serra, Catalina. Review, “20 creadoras se sirven del humor, el drama y el sexo para analizar los arquetipos femeninos”, El Pais, Barcelona, Spain, January 23, 1998, p. 34.
- Tishken, Keith. Review, “The Terror of Thoughts”, Art in Progress, Baltimore, Maryland, Feb. 25, 1992.
- Vidal, Jaume, Review, “El mecenas Rafael Tous ofrece de nuevo Metronom...”, El País, Barcelona, Spain, October 1, 1999, p. 16.
- Wall, Tim. Review, “Messages about the Media”, The Guardian, April 3, 1985.
- Wachunas, Tom. Review, “Witnesses to Oppression”, Downtown, No. 200, New York, June 20, 1990, pg. 14-A.*
