= Brad Buckley =

Australian artist

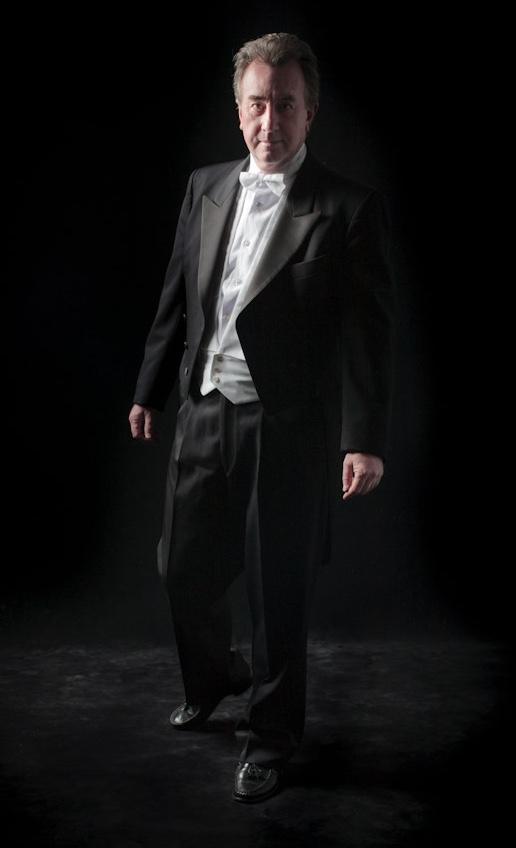
- Born: Sydney, NSW, Australia
- Education: Saint Martins School of Art, London; Rhode Island School of Design
- Occupations: Artist, urbanist, writer, academic
- Years active: 1973–present

Brad Buckley (born 1952, Sydney) is an Australian artist, activist, urbanist and was a Professorial Fellow at Victorian College of the Arts, Faculty of Fine Arts and Music, the University of Melbourne (2017–2024). He was also a foundation research fellow at the Centre of Visual Art (CoVA) at the University of Melbourne. Buckley was previously, Professor of Contemporary Art and Culture at Sydney College of the Arts, the University of Sydney. He has exhibited widely, with exhibitions across Australia, and globally in the United States, Germany, Canada, Poland, Japan, Taiwan, New Zealand, Israel, and Norway.

Known for his polemical writings, he has also published extensively on contemporary art, art schools, curating and the neo-liberal influence on society.

Buckley's writings have been published by Pluto Press Australia, NSCAD Press (Canada), Libri Publishing (UK), Bandicoot Publishing (Australia), Sydney University Press (Australia), Power Publications, (Australia), Rowman & Littlefield Publishers (New York), Routledge Advances in Art and Visual Studies (New York), The Pennsylvania State University Press (US) and Wiley-Blackwell (US).

He is a regularly contributor to journals, such as, Broadsheet: Contemporary Art + Culture and Artist Profile. Many of these articles and publications were co-written or co-edited with his late friend and colleague John Conomos (1947–2024).

== Background ==
Buckley is a sixth-generation Australian, predominately of Irish and Celtic heritage and his immediate ancestors are a mix of lawyers and artisans. His paternal family are mainly from County Cork, which was a stronghold of the Irish Republican Army (IRA) during the Irish War of Independence (1919–1921). This area of Ireland, particularly West Cork, still has a high percentage of people who speak Gaeltacht (Irish Gaelic). Buckley has spoken about his strong affinity with his Gaelic and Celtic ancestry and how this has influenced his sense of social justice.

He spent his childhood years in the eastern suburbs of Sydney before travelling and living in Europe and the United States during the 1970s and 1980s. His father, Jim Buckley, owned the Newcastle Hotel in Lower George Street, Sydney. The Newcastle was one of the Sydney Push 'hotels' – the Push members were bohemian, anti-authoritarian, anarchist – and The Newcastle was frequented by artists, poets, writers, journalists, underworld figures and philosophers between 1956 and 1972.

He was educated at Saint Martin’s School of Art, London, (now Central Saint Martins, University of the Arts, London), and the prestigious Rhode Island School of Design, where he graduated with a Master of Fine Arts in 1982. Buckley returned to live in New York (1990–1992) as a Creative Australia (formally the Australia Council of the Arts) fellow at MoMA/PS1.

Buckley has been an active leader in the broader art world; as co-chair of the Artspace Visual Arts Centre Board (1985–88), he worked with Professor Su Baker AM and director Sally Couacaud to negotiate a permanent home for Artspace at the Gunnery in Woolloomooloo, Sydney. As chair (2001–06), he worked with executive director Nicholas Tsoutas to negotiate an increase in Artspace’s funding from $300,000 to $1,000,000 per year, as part of the Commonwealth government’s Visual Arts and Craft Strategy (VACS).

== Works ==
While living in London, Buckley saw several plays by Samuel Beckett performed by Beckett's preferred leading actor, Billy Whitelaw, which had a profound influence on his thinking about art and the role it plays in the world.

Buckley's works operate within an overarching schema entitled The Slaughterhouse Project, which is an aesthetic armature, a strategy used for aesthetic infiltration, or infection. As the name implies, the Project is a conceptual device of cauterisation, a way of exploring taboos, for investigating political anomalies, for venting dissatisfaction with social injustice. Operating at the intersection of installation, theatre and performance, the work investigates questions of cultural control, democracy, freedom and social responsibility. Buckley's work has been included in:

- the 3rd International Biennial (Ljubljana, Slovenia),
- the 4th Construction in Process 1993 (the Artists' Museum, Lodz, Poland),
- the 5th Construction in Process 1995 (the Artists' Museum, Mitzpe Ramon, Israel),
- the 9th Biennale of Sydney, Australia, and
- The Deconsumptionists, Art as Archive, 2014 (Museum of Contemporary Art Detroit, US).

His work has been exhibited at:

- Franklin Furnace Archive (New York),
- Artspace (Auckland),
- the Art Gallery of New South Wales,
- the Kunstlerhaus Bethanien (Berlin),
- The Museum of Art, Rhode Island School of Design (US),
- The Visual Arts Gallery (University of Alabama at Birmingham),
- La Chambre Blanche (Quebec),
- Artspace Visual Arts Centre (Sydney),
- MoMA/PS 1 (New York),
- Institute of Modern Art (Brisbane),
- Institute of Contemporary Art Newtown (ICAN) (Sydney),
- Dalhousie Art Gallery (Halifax, Canada),
- Tsukuba Art Gallery (Japan),
- Plato’s Cave (New York),
- Australian Centre for Photography (Sydney),
- Reflex Wall Painting Project (Toowoomba, Australia).
- Kandos Projects (Kandos, Australia),
- Macquarie University Art Gallery, Macquarie University (Australia), and
- Yilan Museum of Art (Yilan, Taiwan).

His work has been cited in New Observations, Art + Text (Sydney), Flash Art (Milan), Artforum International, and Art in America.

Two catalogues have been published on his work.

- Brad Buckley, Brett Levine (ed.), essay by Brett Levine and an interview by Nicholas Tsoutas, Artspace Visual Arts Centre (2011).
- Brad Buckley and John Conomos Monograph, (Buckley and Conomos eds.), essays by Brett Levine, ‘Princes Kept the View’ and Edward Colless ‘Abecedarium’, and Biljana Jancic and Alex Gawronski ‘Interview’, Australian Centre for Photography, (2013).
Vigilance, 1992–1993, vinyl text, Macquarie Lighthouse, dimensions variable, The Boundary Rider, 9th Biennale of Sydney, Australia. Photograph by Phil George.

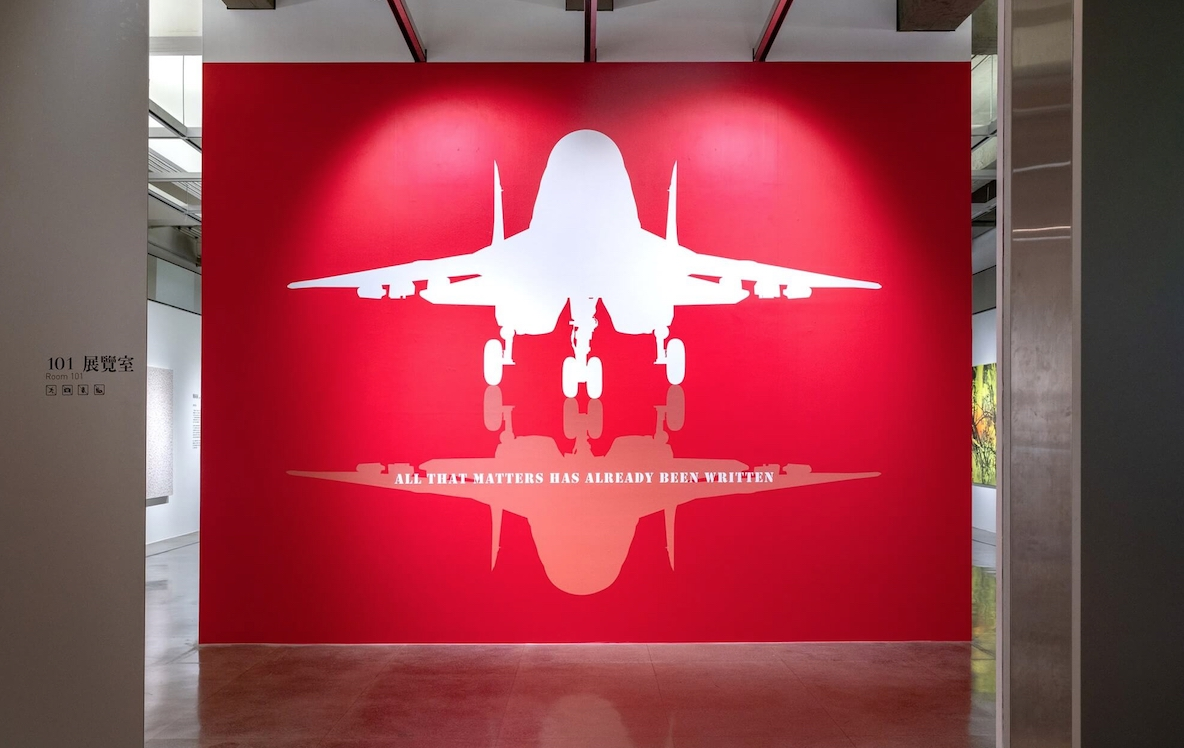
In a time of deceit telling the truth is a revolutionary act, 2025–2026, ink on vinyl decal, Echoed Worlds: Taiwan and Australia Contemporary Art, Yilan Museum of Art, Yilan, Taiwan.

== Curatorial work ==
Buckley has a longstanding interest in curating and has undertaken projects at the Museum of Art, the Rhode Island School of Design and the Institute of Modern Art in Brisbane. At Sydney’s Artspace Visual Arts Centre in 1997, he curated (with Nicholas Tsoutas) an exhibition of the seminal American conceptual artist Lawrence Wiener. The exhibition included four satellite installations by younger artists: Mark Brown, Adam Cullen, Susan Johnston and Katharina Struber. He also co-curated with Blair French Reading and Writing Rooms, which was a major 30-year survey of New Zealand-born, Canada-based artist Bruce Barber, and was held in 2008 at Artspace. The project was developed in conjunction with Manukau Institute of Technology and Te Tuhi Centre for the Arts in Auckland, where a partner component of the exhibition opened in December of the same year.

In 2018, he co-curated with Helen Hyatt-Johnston, Couplings, at the Dominik Mersch Gallery, Sydney, Australia. This exhibition considered the cognitive and emotional lives that operates between artist couples, whether conscious or unconscious and how this dialogue influences their work.

Buckley’s two most recent curatorial projects in 2025 are Ken Unsworth: Love is the Sweetest Thing at Macquarie University Art Gallery, Macquarie University in Sydney. This exhibition consisted of five new installations, two of which were positioned as you entered the gallery, while the other three were ‘housed’ in the purpose-built rooms. Buckley has said of Unsworth, “Unlike many Australian artists who at the end of their working lives seem to become tone deaf to their own failings, Unsworth, now in his nineties, is producing new works that are the most insightful, emotionally compelling and magically irrational of his career.”

In September of the same year, he curated a major retrospective exhibition Royston Harpur: A Painter’s Painter (co-curated with Noel Thurgate, Lizzy Galloway and Helen Hyatt-Johnston) at Mudgee Arts Precinct, Mudgee, Australia. The aim of this retrospective was to affirm Harpur’s place within the lineage of Australian post–World War II abstract painting.

Harpur belonged to a select group of artists – including Stanislaus Rapotec, Yvonne Audette, Peter Upward, John Olsen and Ian Fairweather – who shared an affinity for the Zen ideals of restraint, contemplation, and expression. This exhibition not only reflected Harpur’s mastery of form and surface but also his enduring contribution to the spiritual and intellectual fabric of Australian art.

== Academia ==
As a teacher at Sydney College of the Arts (1989–2017), Buckley has taught and influenced several generations of contemporary Australian artists working within painting, installation, performance and new media art, including Nuha Saad, Beata Geyer, Jelena Telecki, Teo Treloar, Sean Lowry, Kyle Jenkins, Alex Gawronski, Tony Schwensen, Sarah Newall, David Haines, Mark Shorter, Rowan Conroy, Sylvia Schwenk, Shaun Gladwell, Ben Quilty, Koji Ryui, Justene Williams, Bijana Jancic, Catherine Payne, Bronwyn Bancroft, Yiorgos Zafiriou, and Salvatore Panatteri.

Since 2003, Buckley has lectured and written widely on higher degrees and research in the art school context. In 2003, Buckley was invited to be the keynote speaker at the Visual Arts PhD Programs seminar at the Royal Danish Academy of Fine Arts. He was a keynote speaker in 2007 at the International Symposium on Art and Design: University Art Practice and Research Funding, at the University of Tsukuba in Japan. He also developed and convened, with Simone Douglas and senior faculty members, a conference on higher degrees and research in the art and design school context, entitled Evolution: Art and Design Research and the PhD, at The New School (New York) in October 2010. Buckley and Su Baker AM, Pro-Vice Chancellor and Director of the Centre of Visual Art, Victorian College of the Arts, the University of Melbourne, received in 2008–09 an Australian Learning and Teaching Council (ALTC) grant to undertake research into the impact of the PhD in visual arts in Australian universities over the past decade.

His commitment and contribution to graduate supervision was recognised in 2004 with the awarding of the first College of Humanities and Social Sciences (CHASS), the University of Sydney, Award for Excellence in Research, Higher Degree Supervision. In 2016, Buckley was awarded the Sydney University Postgraduate Representative Association (SUPRA) Supervisor of the Year Award. Buckley has supervised 50 MFA and PhD candidates to completion.

He has been a visiting artist and professor at numerous institutions throughout Asia, Europe and North America including the University of Tsukuba (Japan), National College of Art and Design (Dublin, Ireland), the Nova Scotia College of Art and Design University (Canada) and at the Royal Danish Academy of Fine Arts. During 2009 and 2013, Buckley was a visiting scholar at Parsons The New School for Design (New York).

== Publishing projects ==
He is the editor, with John Conomos, of Republics of Ideas: Republicanism Culture Visual Arts (2001); Rethinking the Contemporary Art School: The Artist, the PhD and the Academy (2009), Ecologies of Invention (with Andy Dong) (2013), Erasure: The Spectre of Cultural Memory (2015), Who Runs the Artworld: Money, Power and Ethics (2017), and A Companion to Curation (2020). This book was translated into Mandarin in 2024 by Meng Tong and Xiangguang Song, International Museum Studies Translation Series, Oriental Publishing Center, Shanghai, China.

Buckley has also developed and chaired (with Conomos) a number of conference sessions for the College Art Association, including America: The Divine Empire (Atlanta, 2005), The Contemporary Collaborator in an Interdisciplinary World (Dallas, 2008), The Erasure of Contemporary Memory (New York, 2011) and Co-Chaired, with John Conomos, the session “The Delinquent Curator: has the curator failed contemporary art?”, 101st College Art Association (CAA) conference in New York City, 2013. His most recent conference which he chaired and developed Gatekeeping and Ethics in a Globalised Artworld, was held at the Centre of Visual Art (CoVA), at Victorian College of the Arts, Faculty of Fine Arts and Music, the University of Melbourne and the National Gallery of Victoria, Australia.
