= Ewerdt Hilgemann =

German artist

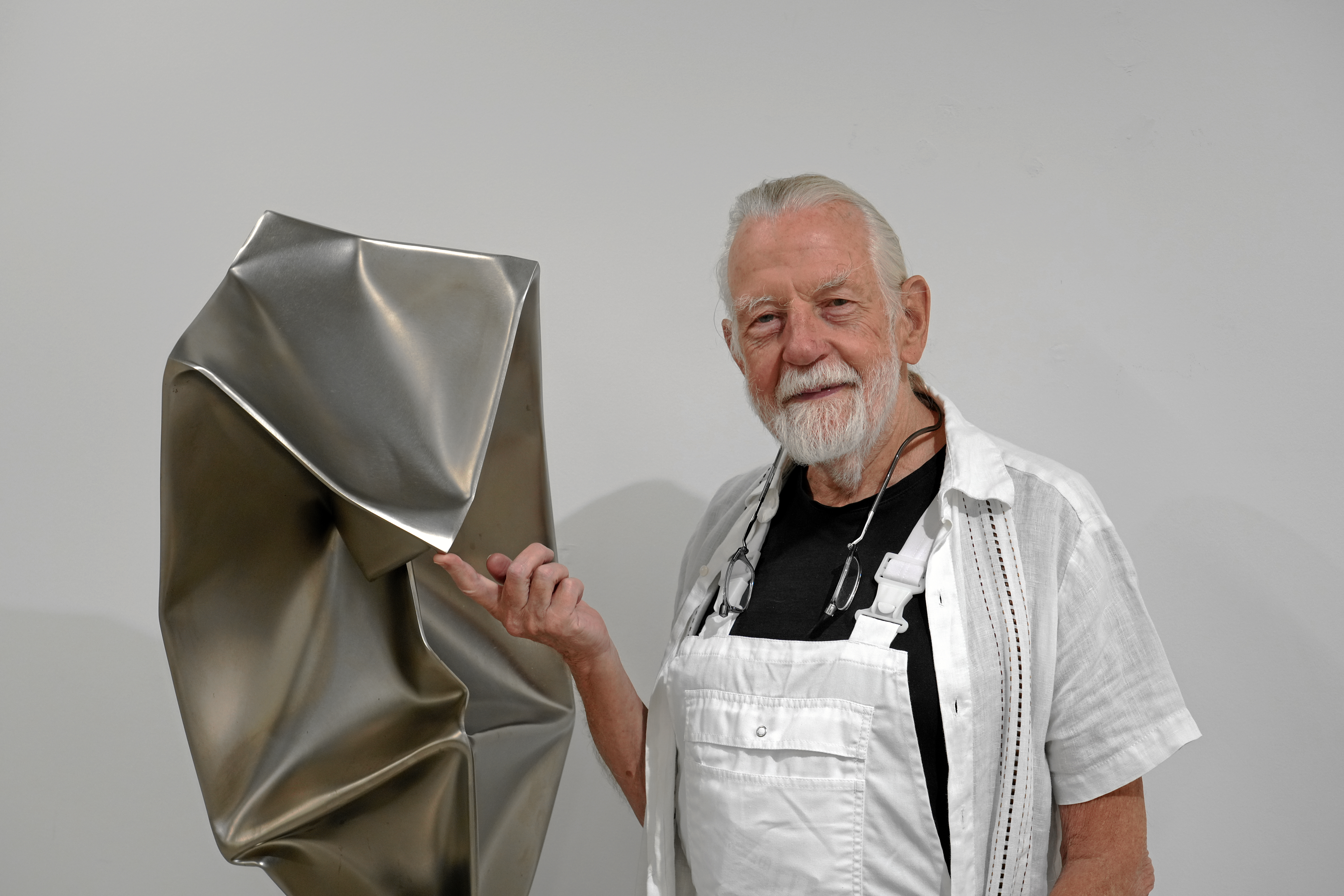
- Ewerdt Hilgemann with 'Stretched Double' at Galerie Geiger in Konstanz
- Born: February 21, 1938 (age 88); Witten, Germany
- Website: www.hilgemann.nl

Ewerdt Hilgemann (Born in Witten, February 21, 1938) is a German artist, currently living and working in the Netherlands.

== Studies and career ==
Ewerdt Hilgemann was born in Witten, Germany and after a brief study at Westfälische Wilhelms-University in Münster, he attended Werkkunstschule and University of Saarland in Saarbrücken. In the 1960s he had residencies at Kätelhöhn Printers in Wamel, Asterstein in Koblenz and Halfmannshof in Gelsenkirchen, Germany. Hilgemann started to exhibit his work across Europe in the early 1960s before moving to Gorinchem, the Netherlands in 1970. From 1977 to 1998 he taught Concept Development at the Sculpture Department of Willem de Kooning Academy in Rotterdam. Since 1984 Hilgemann lives and works in Amsterdam. His main workshop, however, remained in Hardinxveld-Giessendam, near Gorinchem.

== Work ==
Hilgemann's bodies of work from the 1960s focused on wall pieces, consisting of wooden dowels, as well as serial and minimalistic installations ("Space Structures") out of large resin or steel tubes. In the 1970s, reliefs and mostly wooden abstract geometrical sculptures followed, based on grids as well as the cube. The 1980s meant a change in thinking, when Hilgemann made his first photographic work Random Sculptures (for herman de vries), followed by a series of granite boulders e.g. referencing to the (maximum) cube that can fit inside a sphere by cutting away what was needed to reveal the cube, yet showing all parts of the process. In 1982, for the first time with an audience, he rolled a perfectly polished marble cube (150x150x150 cm) down hill in the famous Carrara quarry, where Michelangelo already got his marble from. The result was a scratched and battered piece, but it still remained recognisable as a cube! "Rolling Cube 1982 (shortened video)".

Likewise, in 1983 he brought two perfectly polished spheres to a controlled explosion, resulting in fractured pieces carefully accounted for (3 parts for the white Carrara marble, 9 parts for the dark Bardiglio marble). The same year, during sculpture symposium East-West Forum in Dordrecht, Netherlands he made his first welded steel cube, which he threw down from the rooftop of an abandoned factory.

These sculptures and their planned destruction depend to a large extent on random circumstances. However, these can also be premeditated by stipulating their conditions. According to the artist, this equally is the case with his so-called "Implosion Sculptures", which Hilgemann started in 1984 and that are still going on. The perfectly welded stainless steel geometrical shapes are vacuumed by a pump (or by means of water), causing the body to slowly give way to the outside pressure, resulting in a new form, yet leaving a visual reference to the original. The most used shapes are cubes, square columns and pyramids.

In 2014 Hilgemann was invited by the Park Avenue Sculpture Committee to exhibit his work on the median along Park Avenue in New York City for a period of three months, starting in August. For this prestigious environment Hilgemann designed new works for seven locations between 52nd and 67th Street, all made of stainless steel in different configurations, single pieces as well as groups of two or more.

=== Works in public spaces (selection) ===
2021 Threesome, EUREF Campus, Berlin, Germany

2020 Three of a kind, Smalley Sculpture Garden, California

2017 Imploded pyramid, Grugapark, Essen, Germany

2011 Three Graces, Bad Soden, Germany

2010 Imploded Column, New Pacific, Beverly Hills, California

2006 Quint, Hervormd Lyceum, Amsterdam, Netherlands

2005 Double-Up, Aegon Collection, The Hague, Netherlands

2004 Panta Rhei, City of Hünfeld, Germany

2000 Cerberus, Investment Bank Berlin, Germany

1996 Imploded Cube, Il-San Sculpture Park, Ko-Yang City, Korea

1995 Imploded Column, City of Sárospatak, Hungary

1992 Fountain, City of Ingolstadt, Germany

1992 Delft Implosion, Technical University Delft, Netherlands

1991 Plus Minus, City of Gorinchem, Netherlands (co-production Jan van Munster)

1991 Homage to Brancusi, City of Galati, Romania

1990 Reflection, City of Nivala, Finland

1989 Tension, City of Rotterdam

1987 Birth, City of Heemstede, Netherlands

1986 Rolling Cube, City of Sion, Switzerland

1986 Natura Artis Magistra, University Nymegen, Netherlands

1986 Imploded Column (Elblag Implosion), Elblag, Poland

1986 Imploded Pyramid, City of Kleinsassen, Germany

1985 Imaginary Landscape, IWO, Amsterdam, Netherlands

1985 Exploded Sphere, Sculpture Park, Dordrecht, Netherlands

1983 Finnish Landscape, City of Kemi, Finland

1979 Field of 32 Cubes, City of Brielle, Netherlands

1978 1+2=3, City of Gorinchem, Netherlands

1974 Three equal volumes, City of Gorinchem, Netherlands

1972 Cube Structure, City of Gorinchem, Netherlands

1969 Space Structure (Bijlmer), City of Amsterdam, Netherlands

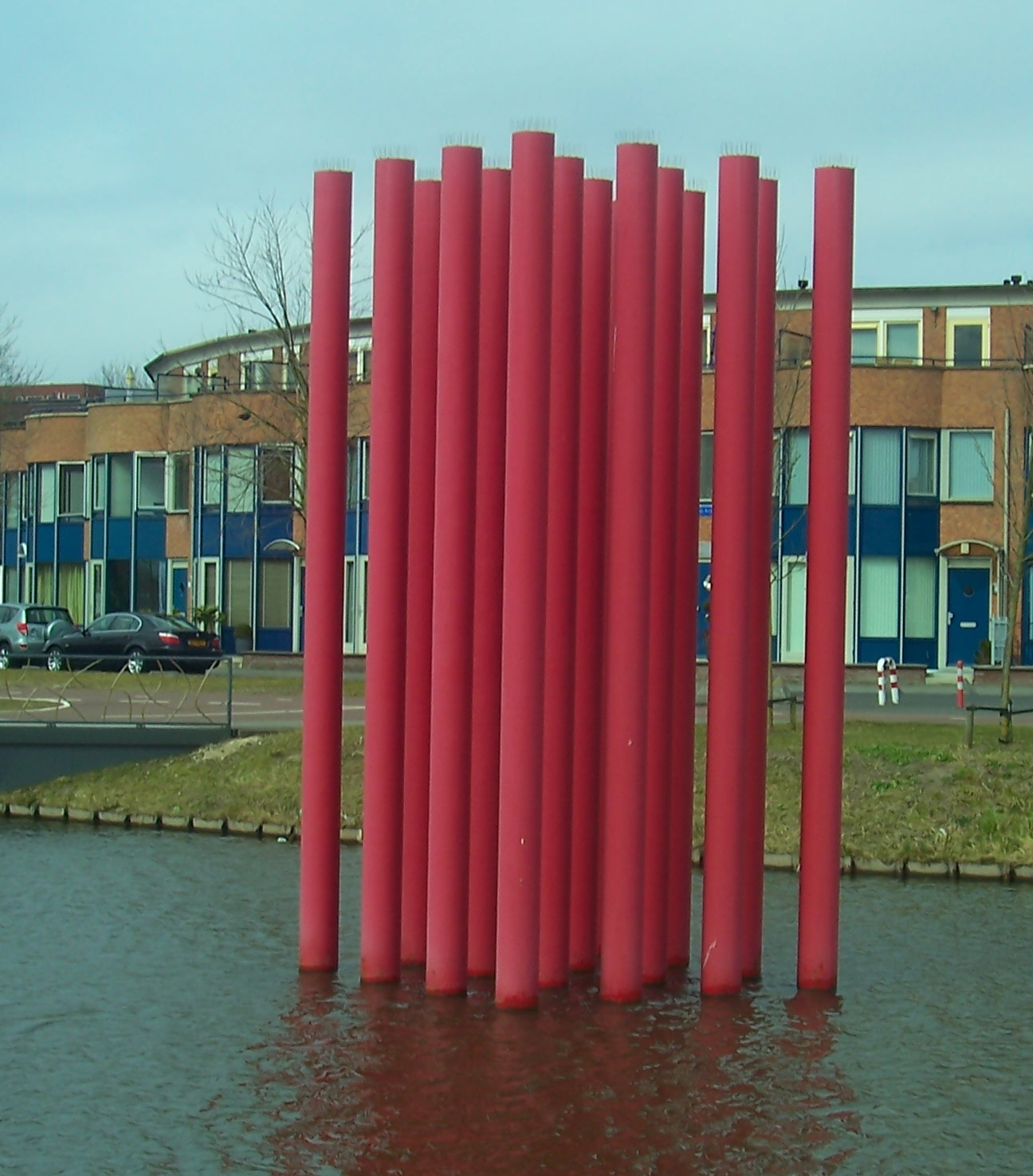
Space Structure (1969). Bijlmerpark (a.k.a. Nelson Mandelapark), Amsterdam

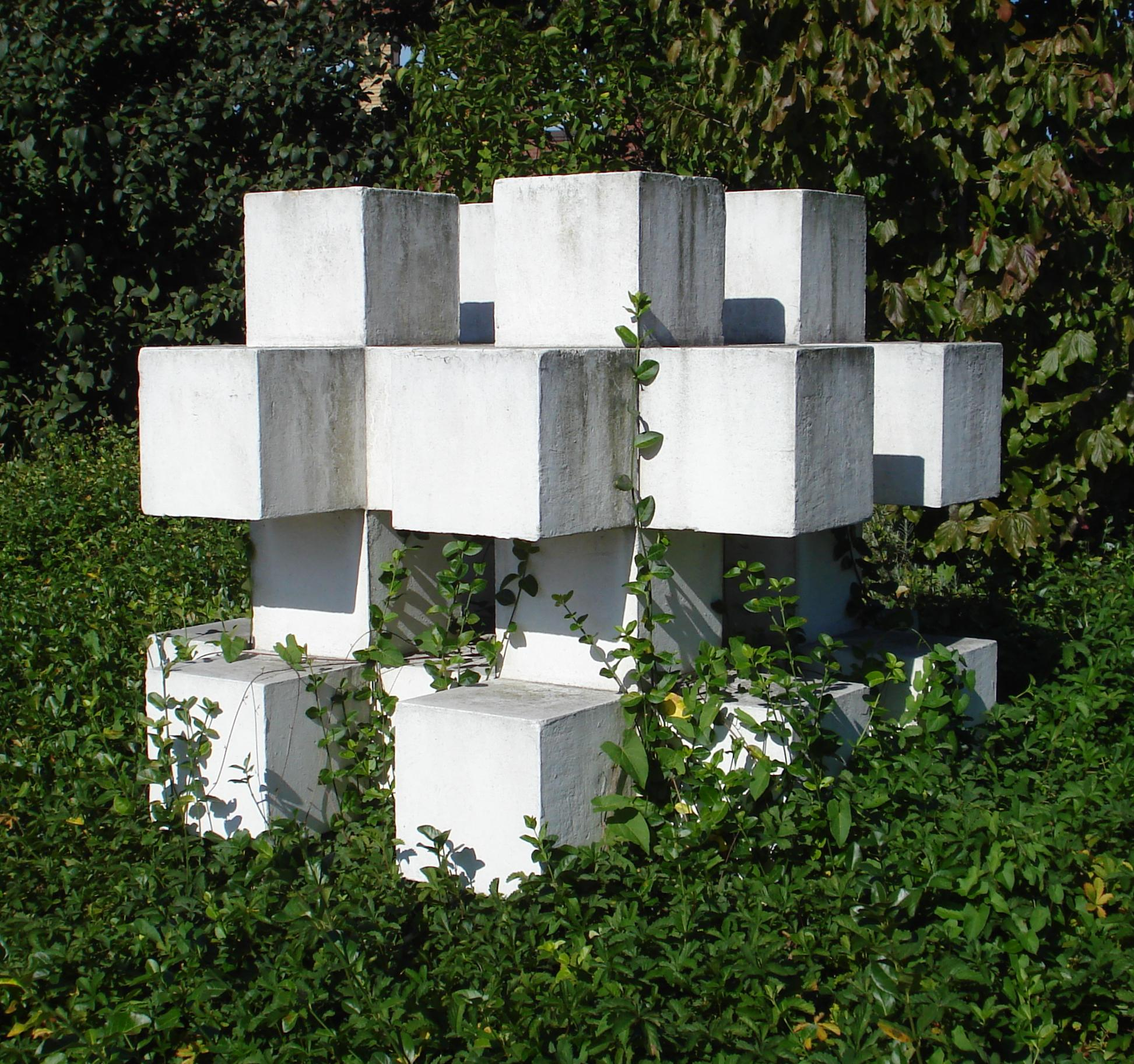
Cube Structure (ca. 1972). Gorinchem

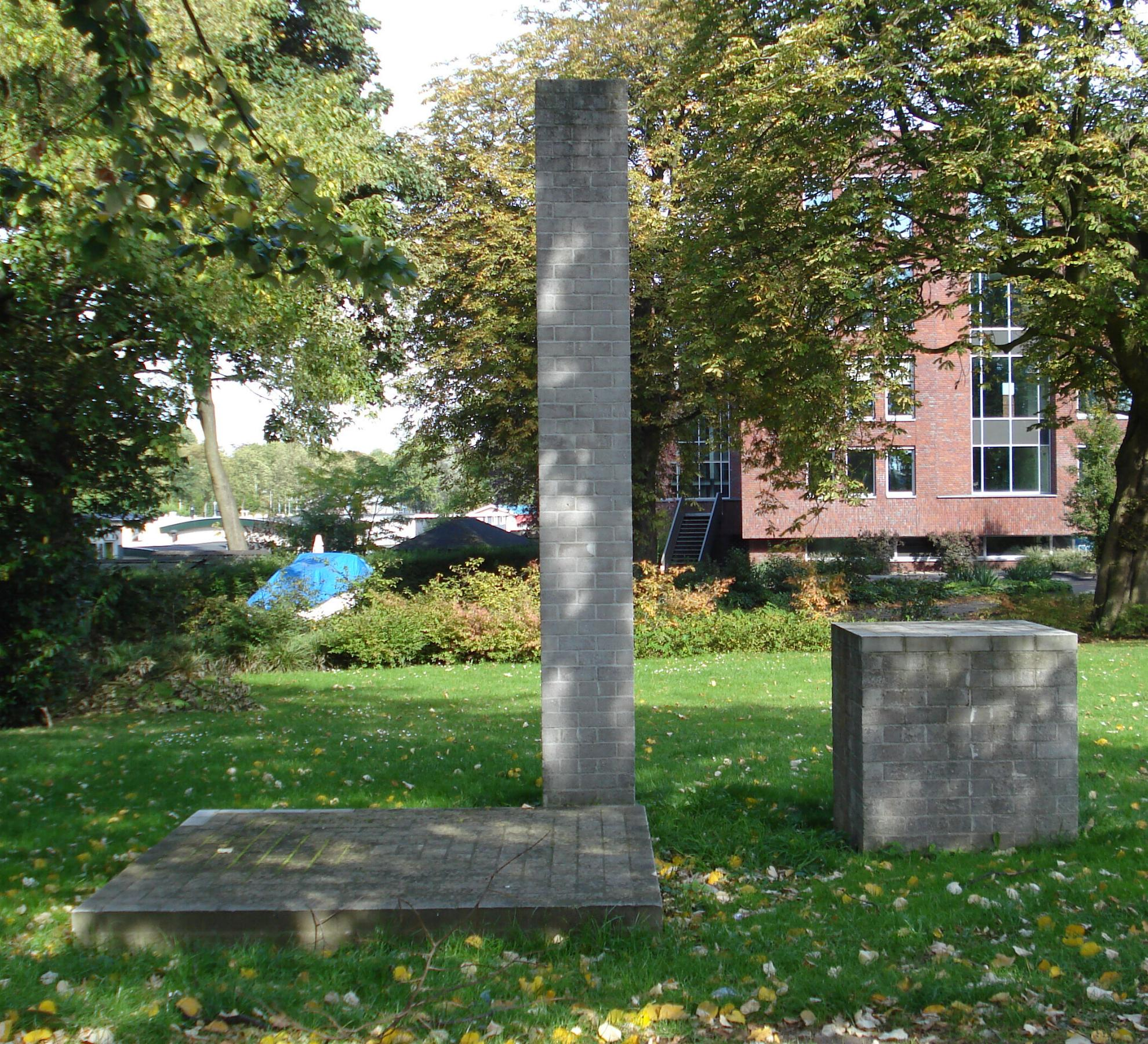
Three equal cubes (1974). Brick. Gorinchem

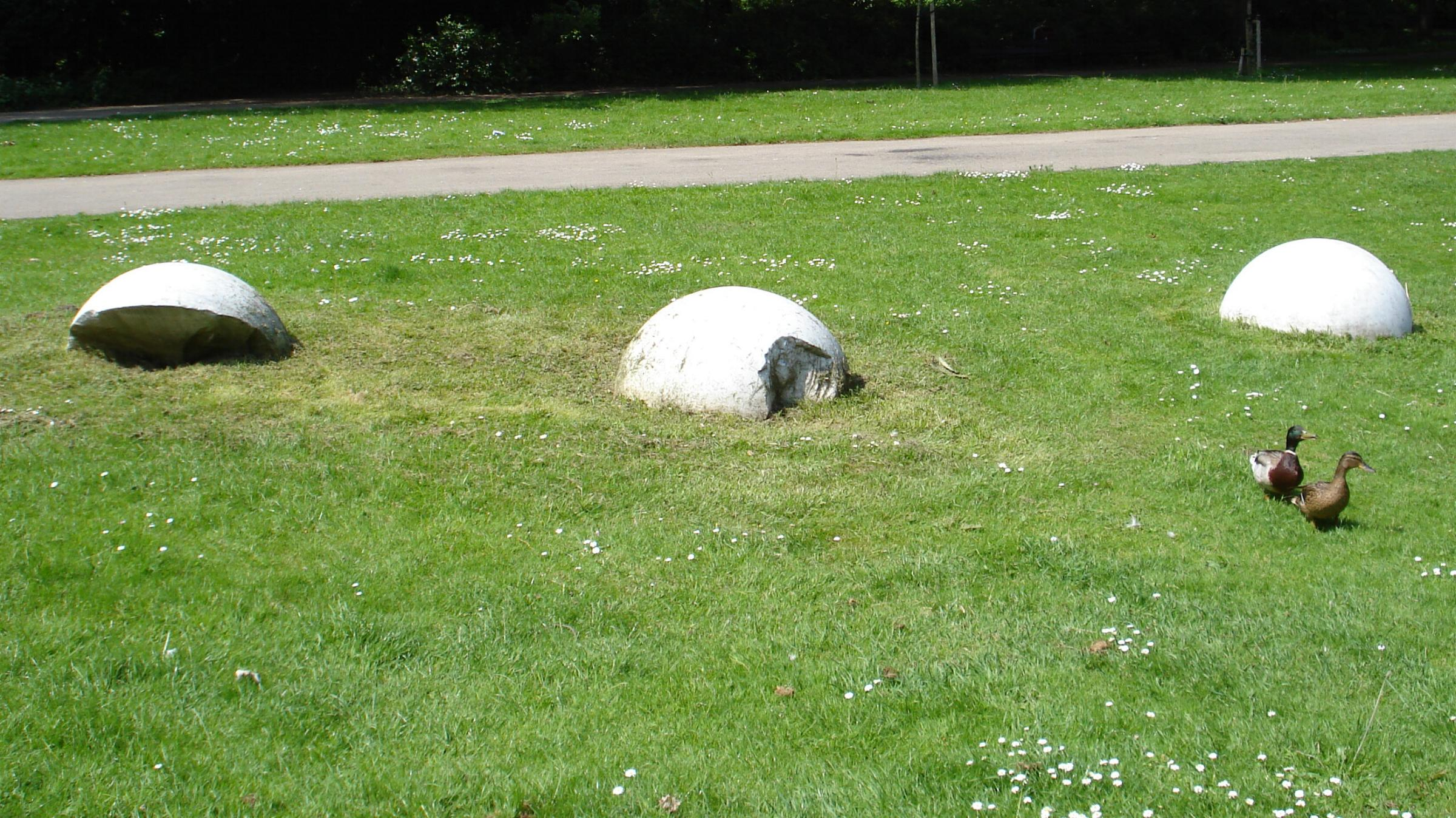
Exploded Sphere (1983). Carrara Marble. Dordrecht

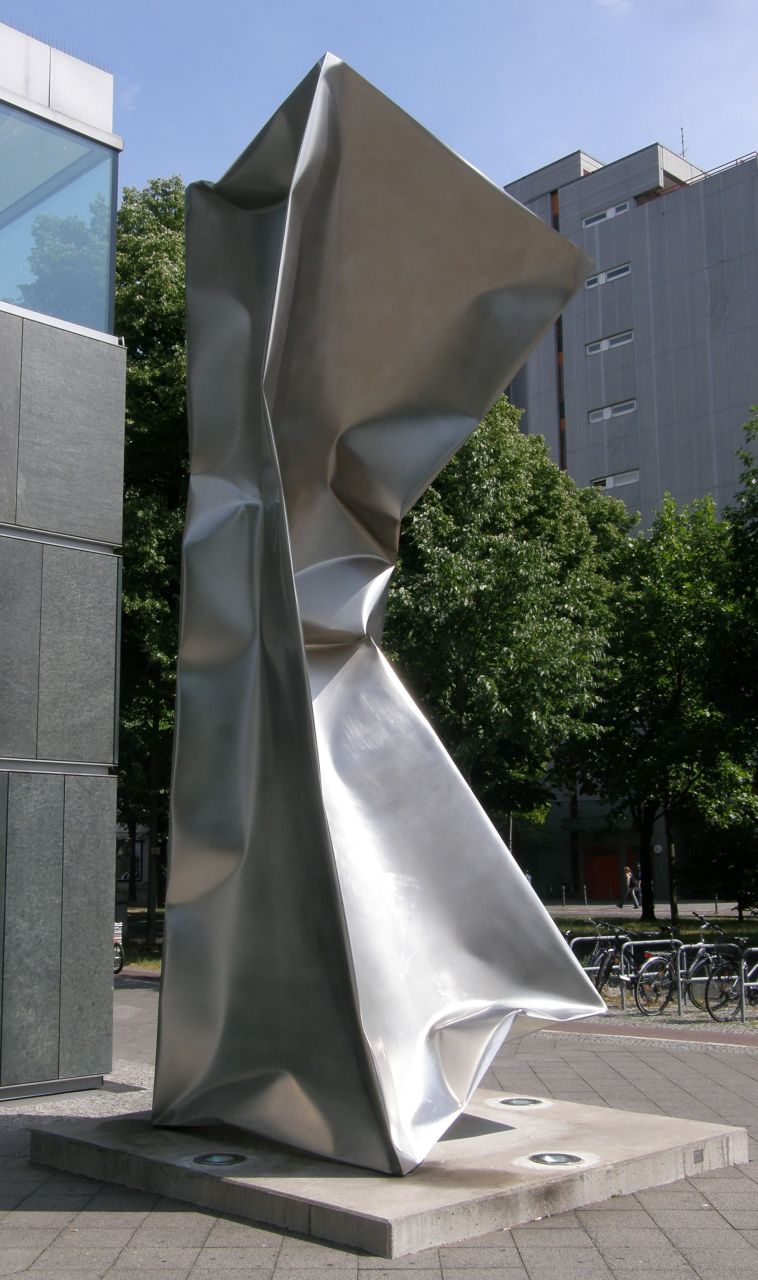
Cerberus (2000), Berlin

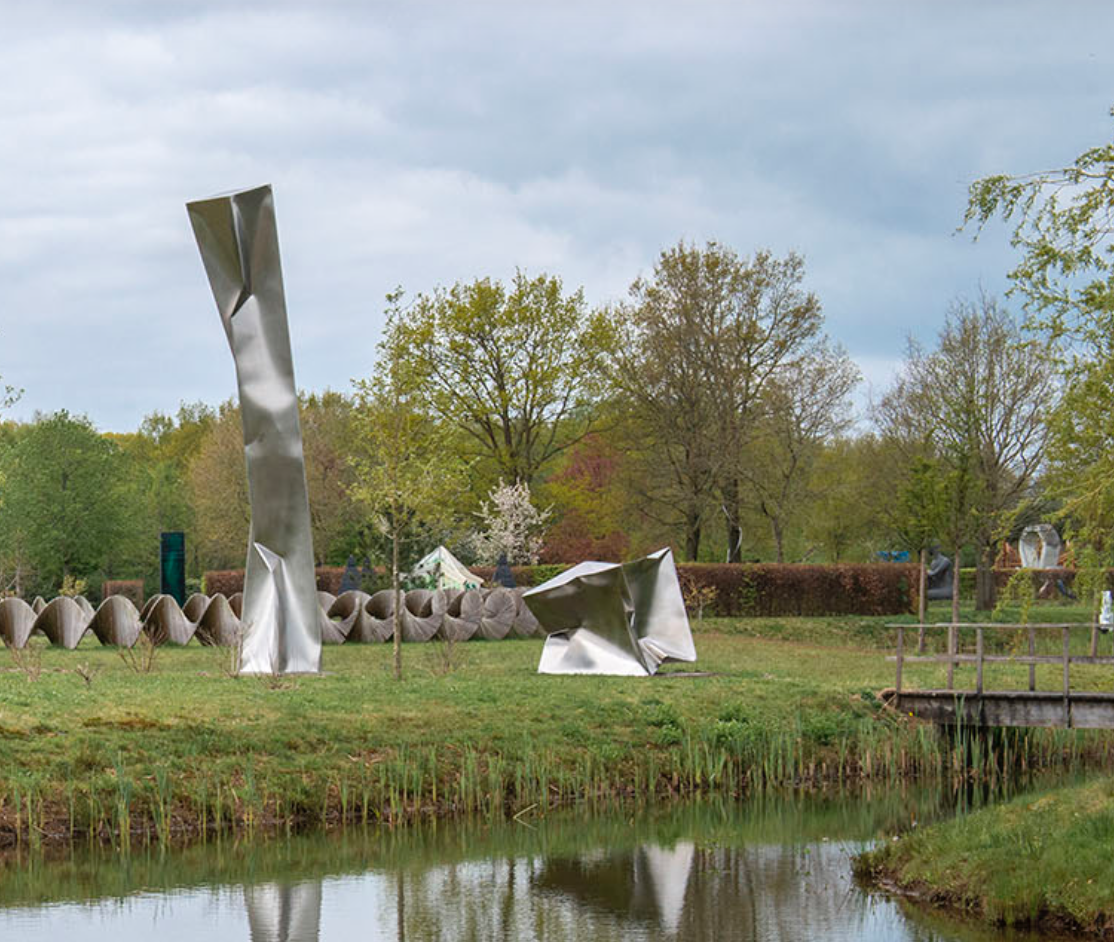
Two equal volumes (2017-2023). Stainless Steel, Anningahof, Zwolle

=== Works in public art collections (selection) ===
Denmark

- Louisiana Museum of Modern Art, Humlebæk

Germany

- Kunsthalle Bremen, Bremen
- Forum Konkrete Kunst, Erfurt
- Letterhausschule, Gelsenkirchen
- Museum Modern Art, Hünfeld
- Museum für Konkrete Kunst, Ingolstadt
- Museum Abteiberg, Mönchengladbach
- Lenbachhaus, München
- City of Herne/Wanne-Eickel
- Museum im Kulturspeicher, Würzburg
- Kunsthalle Bremen, Germany

Hungary

- Vasarely Museum, Budapest

Netherlands

- Museum Mondriaan Huis, Amersfoort
- Modern Art Museum, Arnhem
- Dordrechts Museum, Dordrecht
- Van Abbemuseum, Eindhoven
- Rijksmuseum Twenthe, Enschede
- Gorcums Museum, Gorinchem
- Groninger Museum, Groningen
- Bonnefantenmuseum, Maastricht
- Kröller-Müller Museum, Otterlo

Poland

- Museum Chelm, Chelm
- Muzeum Sztuki w Lodz, Lodz
- BWA Lublin, Lublin

Turkey

- Elgiz Museum, Istanbul

== Literature (selection) ==
- Saul Ostrow, in cat. EH / Ewerdt Hilgemann, 'Elemental Force', 2015, Art Affairs, Amsterdam, ISBN 978-90-73985-00-1
- Katherine Hahn, in aRude Magazine, 'Ewerdt Hilgemann: Interview’, 2014, New York
- Uwe Rüth, in cat. Ewerdt Hilgemann: Bodies of Work, ‘Ewerdt Hilgemann's Aesthetic of Life’, 2009, Art Affairs, Amsterdam ISBN 978-90-73985-07-0
- Piet Augustijn, in cat. Inside Out, 'Ewerdt Hilgemann en de natuur als medescheppende kracht', 2003, Gorcums Museum, Gorinchem ISBN 978-90-73985-07-0
- Frans Jeursen, in magazine Art-nl, 'Ewerdt Hilgemann: the air-smith from Dortmund’, 2003, Amsterdam
- Joel Fisher, in cat. Ewerdt Hilgemann: In Situ, 2001, Art Affairs, Amsterdam, ISBN 90-73985-05-6
- Colette Chattopadhyay, in cat. Ewerdt Hilgemann: Imploded Sculptures, 2001, Irvine Fine Arts Center, Californië
- Cees de Boer, in cat. Ewerdt Hilgeman: In Situ, ‘from: A letter to the Mondriaan- huis, Amersfoort’, 2001, Art Affairs, Amsterdam
- Burkhard Brunn, in Frankfurter Rundschau, ‘Würfels Ende – Sichtbar gemachter Druck’, 1998, Frankfurt
- Bozena Kowalska, in cat. Ewerdt Hilgemann: 1980–1990, ‘Poet of creative destruction’, 1998, Art Affairs, Amsterdam, ISBN 90-73985-01-3
- Getulio Alviani, in invite Ewerdt Hilgemann, 'Dal previsto all'improvedibile', 1997, Vismara Arte, Milan
- Paul Hefting, in Elsevier, 'De Eigen Ruimte, Beeld- houwkunst na 1945', 1996, Amsterdam/ Brussels
- Anneliese Knorr, in Mitteilungen #2, 'Momente der Wahrheit: Ewerdt Hilgemanns Pendeln zwischen Planung und Zufall’, 1996, Kunstverein Gelsenkirchen im Museum, Buer
- Eugen Gomringer, in cat. Hilgemann: Implosions, ‘Transformationen in Raum und Zeit – Die Implosionen’, 1995, Museum für Konkrete Kunst, Ingolstadt
- Cees de Boer, in cat. Hilgemann: Implosions, ‘The Landscape That We Call Our Body’, 1995, Museum für Konkrete Kunst, Ingolstadt
- Clemens Krümmel, in Aus dem Würfel- museum: Eine Führung, 1990, Karl Ernst Osthaus- Museum, Hagen
- Charlotte Sabroe, in cat. Louisiana: The Collection and Buildings, ‘Constructivism’, 1988, Museum of Modern Art, Humlebaek
- A.P. de Stigter, in Quad 7/8, ‘Hilgemann: Brutal Sculptures’, 1984, Frits Bless, Maarssen
- Willy Rotzler, Konstruktive Konzepten, 1977, ABC Verlag, Zürich, ISBN 3-85504-037-0
- Jean Leering, in Ricerca contemporanea 4, 'Programmi sistematici', 1975, Vanni Scheiwiller, Milan
- R.H. Fuchs, in About Hilgemann, 'Dividing with system and dialectics', 1973 Gorinchem
- Manfred Fath, in Systematische Programme: Ad Dekkers, Ewerdt Hilgemann, Jan Schoonhoven, herman de vries, 1973, Städtische Kunstsammlungen, Ludwigshafen
