= Karin Sander =

German artist (born 1957)

Karin Sander (born 1957 in Bensberg, North Rhine-Westphalia) is a German conceptual artist. She lives and works in Berlin and Zurich. Karin Sander works across media, including sculpture, performance, photography, video, and architecture. At the core of her conceptual practice is an engagement with existing situations, spaces, and institutional contexts. Her works intervene in given structures, transform them, and render them newly legible.

== Life ==
=== Education ===
Sander studied art and art history at the Freie Kunstschule Stuttgart and at the Staatliche Akademie der Bildenden Künste Stuttgart, among others with professor Jürgen Brodwolf. From 1989 to1990 she received a scholarship from the German Academic Exchange Service (DAAD-scholarship) for New York, where she attended the Independent Study Program (ISP) of the Whitney Museum of American Art.

=== Teaching ===
Sander has been invited to visiting professorships at the Iceland University of Arts, Reykjavík (Listaháskóli Íslands, 1993), CalArts (California Institute of the Arts, Los Angeles) (1995), Akademie der Bildenden Künste in Karlsruhe (1995–1996), Staatliche Akademie der Bildenden Künste Stuttgart (1997–1998) and Elam School of Fine Arts, Auckland (2003). From 1999 to 2007, she had a professorship at the Kunsthochschule Berlin-Weissensee. From 2007 to 2023, she held the chair for architecture and art at the ETH Zurich Swiss Federal Institute of Technology. She understood her teaching as a continuation of her artistic practice.

=== Other activities ===
Sander is a member of Deutscher Künstlerbund (Association of German Artists) and the Internationalen Künstlergremium (International Artists’ Committee). In 2007, Sander was elected to the Akademie der Künste (Academy of Arts) Berlin. Since November 2021, she has been director of the fine arts section there. In this capacity, she was a member of the juries that selected Katharina Sieverding (2017) and Candida Höfer (2024) as recipients of the Käthe Kollwitz Prize. In 2024, she was also part of the jury that selected Simone Fattal as a recipient of the Academy's Berlin Art Prize.

In 2023, Sander and art and architecture historian Philip Ursprung represented Switzerland in the Swiss pavilion at the 18th Venice Biennale of Architecture.

Karin Sander is represented by the galleries Esther Schipper, Berlin (since 2012), I8 Gallery, Reykjavik (since 2000), Galeria Helga de Alvear, Madrid (since 1995) und Galerie Nächst St. Stephan – Rosemarie Schwarzwälder, Vienna (since1994).

She is also engaged in cultural and urban policy in Berlin, advocating for the preservation of artists’ studio spaces, including in the development of the Uferhallen site. In 2000, Sander was part of a group of 15 artists and architects who bought a complex of buildings called Werkhof L57, where the Prussian army had once manufactured its uniforms, in Berlin's Moabit. Sander’s share is two levels of a three-story building, one on the ground floor and the other on the third floor, with a combined space of about 5,800 square feet.

== Work (selection) ==
In her exhibitions, Sander refers to existing situations and addresses their institutional, political and historical contexts. Her work is often sculptural, site-specific and participatory. The seemingly familiar is rethought, it becomes the starting point of an exploratory process. She uses various media, including painting, sculpture, drawing, electronic media, film and photography. Recurring aspects in her practice include the relationship between art and architecture and the translation of modes of representation into digitally generated three-dimensional visualizations. Her works combine analytical rigor with sensory experience and reflect fundamental questions of space, perception, materiality, and social context. Particularly influential is her early and consistent use of digital technologies since the 1990s. In 1997 she began working with 3D scanning and printing processes, developing forms of three-dimensional photography.

=== Wallpieces (since 1986) ===
Wall Pieces is a long-standing series of works in which sanding and polishing of specific areas of the wall create reflective surfaces that mirror their surroundings. The image is produced not by adding material but by removing it. Sander references the illusion of an opening in traditional panel painting and transforms it: the image is created by the viewer’s perspective. The relationship between real space and its representation on a two-dimensional surface is thus expanded. These works have been shown at Museum Abteiberg, Mönchengladbach (permanent, since 1992), the Museum of Modern Art, New York (1994), and the Solomon R. Guggenheim Museum, New York (2004), among many others.

=== Egg, polished, raw, size 0 (1994) ===
Egg, polished, raw, size 0 (1994) is one of Sander’s early sculptural works. By sanding and polishing the originally matte eggshell, a high-glossy, almost transparent surface is created. The reflective surface mirrors its surroundings, while a subtle yellow shimmer hints at the interior. The transformation of a fragile everyday object into a minimalist sculpture addresses feminism and oppositions such as visibility and concealment, or natural form and artistic artifact. The work was developed for the traveling exhibition "Leiblicher Logos, 14 women artists" (1995–2002) of the Institut für Auslandsbeziehungen.

=== Gebrauchsbilder (since 1990) ===
The Gebrauchsbilder are among Sander’s central conceptual work groups. The idea of the image as a representation of reality is realized almost literally—as the direct imprint of a process. Instructions to collectors or institutions to install the work without protection in a place determined by the collector him/herself, create a form of shared authorship. The works are in the process of permanent change and open action. This work series illustrates how Sander deliberately intervenes in private and institutional processes in order to reveal their underlying conditions and bring about lasting change through minimal interventions.

=== Mailed Paintings (since 2004) ===
Mailed Paintings are standard-sized white-primed canvases of various shapes that are sent to exhibitions without any kind of protection and exhibited as they arrive. The collected traces become part of the surface and continuously transform the image as it travels.

=== Kitchen Pieces (since 2012) ===
For her group of work Kitchen Pieces, Sander uses fresh fruits and vegetables, which she nails individually directly onto the wall. While formally recalling the tradition of still life paintings, the works subvert it through the real presence and processes of decay. The organic decomposition becomes an integral part of the work, continuously altering its appearance. The works address transience and everyday life. By relocating of an ordinary object into the context of art, a tension arises between aesthetic expectation and material reality.

=== 3D Body Scans (since 1997) ===
With her 3D body scans, Karin Sander is among the artists who integrated digital scanning and printing technologies into art at a very early stage. People are captured using 3D scanners and reproduced as true-to-scale, colored sculptures. The digitally generated three-dimensional visualizations constitute an important body of work in Sander’s oeuvre. They combine technological precision with social interaction and question representation, scale, and individuality. In projects such as Museum Visitors 1:8, visitors themselves become the artwork. By actively allowing the participants themselves to decide how they are scanned and how they wish to be seen as sculptures, Sander expands the artwork to include social processes. The genre of portraiture becomes an integral part of the work.

==== More selected works ====
- Astro Turf Floorpiece, The Museum of Modern Art, New York, 1994
- Persons 1:10, 3-D-Bodyscans, Galería Helga de Alvear, Madrid, 2000
- Museum Visitors 1:9, 3-D-Bodyscans, Staatsgalerie Stuttgart, 2002
- Wordsearch, a translinguistic sculpture, 4. Oktober 2002, New York Times, in collaboration with Deutsche Bank, 2002
- XML-SVG Code, Source Code of the Exhibition Space, Galerie nächst St. Stephan, Vienna, 2009
- Zeigen. Eine Audiotour durch Berlin, Temporäre Kunsthalle Berlin, 2009–2010

== Works in Public Space (selection) ==
The sculpture Maximilian Joseph Graf von Montgelas (2003–2005, Munich) is based on digitally scanned and evaluated historical portraits. Out of various sources Sander created a computer-generated new composite sculpture of the historically transmitted figure. Sander combines analog and digital methods and deliberately avoids a heroic representation: the figure stands without a pedestal in the public space of Munich’s Promenadeplatz, at the same size as its neighbors. The work critically reflects contemporary approaches to history, memory, and monument traditions.

=== Further works in public space ===
- Point of Interest, Mobimo-Tower Zurich, 2025
- Lehrkamin / Salomonische Säule, Städtisches Berufsschulzentrum für das Bau- und Kunsthandwerk, Munich, 2024
- Transzendenzaufzug, Universität für künstlerische und industrielle Gestaltung, Linz, 2017
- XML-SVG Code, Universität Bayreuth, 2008
- Willy-Brandt-Platz, Messestadt Riem, Munich, 2003
- Delegationsgeschenke, Paul-Löbe-Haus, Deutscher Bundestag, Berlin, 2001
- Center of Gravity / Center of the City of Münster, Skulptur.Projekte in Münster, 1997
- Sechs Litfaßsäulen im Stadtraum, Langenhagen, 1993
- White Passageways, Konstrukcja w Procesie, Łódź, Polen, 1990

== Exhibitions (selected) ==
Sander's work has been exhibited worldwide, particularly in Europe and the United States, notably in solo exhibitions at Museion, Bozen (2020), Kunst Museum Winterthur (2018), the Neuer Berliner Kunstverein (2011), Kunstmuseum St. Gallen (2010), K20 Kunstsammlung North Rhine-Westphalia, Düsseldorf (2010), Temporäre Kunsthalle, Berlin (2009), Kunstverein Arnsberg (2008).

=== Exhibition list (selection) ===
- 1988 and 1989: Karin Sander, Vera Engelhorn Gallery, New York
- 1989: Karin Sander, Galerie Ute Parduhn, Düsseldorf
- 1991: Out of Site. P.S.1 Museum and Institute of Contemporary Art, New York
- 1992: Karin Sander, Städtisches Museum Abteiberg, Mönchengladbach
- 1993: Karin Sander, Kunstraum Neue Kunst, Hannover
- 1994: Projects 46: Karin Sander, Museum of Modern Art, New York
- 1994: Karin Sander, Second Floor Exhibition Space, Reykjavík
- 1995: Leiblicher Logos. 14 Künstlerinnen aus Deutschland, Wanderausstellung des Instituts für Auslandsbeziehungen, Stuttgart
- 1996 Karin Sander, Kunstmuseum St. Gallen, St. Gallen
- 1996: Karin Sander, Galerie nächst St. Stephan, Vienna
- 1997: Skulptur. Projekte in Münster 1997, Münster
- 1998: Karin Sander, Stiftung für konkrete Kunst, Reutlingen
- 1999: Minimal maximal, Staatliche Kunsthalle Baden-Baden, Baden-Baden
- 2001: Art Unlimited, Art 32 Basel, Galerie nächst St. Stephan, Basel
- 2001: Open Ends: White Spectrum, The Museum of Modern Art, New York
- 2001: 010101. Art in Technological Times, San Francisco Museum of Modern Art, San Francisco
- 2001: Karin Sander, i8 Gallery, Reykjavik
- 2002: Karin Sander, Staatsgalerie Stuttgart
- 2002: wordsearch. A translinguistic sculpture. New York Times / Deutsche Bank
- 2003: Karin Sander. 1:9, Centro Galego de Arte Contemporánea, (CGAC) Santiago de Compostela
- 2004: Singular Forms, Solomon R. Guggenheim Museum, New York
- 2005: Karin Sander. Zeigen. Eine Audiotour von Karin Sander, Galerie Mueller-Roth
- 2006: Nichts, Schirn Kunsthalle, Frankfurt am Main
- 2008: SCAPE 2008 Christchurch Biennial of Art in Public Space, Christchurch
- 2009: Karin Sander. Zeigen. Eine Audiotour durch Berlin, Temporäre Kunsthalle Berlin
- 2010: Contemplating the Void, Solomon R. Guggenheim Museum, New York
- 2010: Karin Sander. Museumsbesucher 1:8, K20 Kunstsammlung Nordrhein-Westfalen, Düsseldorf
- 2011: Karin Sander, n.b.k., Neuer Berliner Kunstverein, Berlin
- 2012: Karin Sander. h = 400 cm, Esther Schipper, Berlin
- 2012: Karin Sander. Zeigen. Eine Audiotour durch Baden-Württemberg, Staatliche Kunsthalle Karlsruhe
- 2013: Karin Sander / Holzer Kobler Architekturen Identities on Display, Humboldt Lab Dahlem, Berlin
- 2013: Karin Sander. Visitors on Display, Lehmbruck-Museum, Duisburg
- 2014: Lens-Based Sculpture, Akademie der Künste, Berlin / Kunstmuseum Liechtenstein
- 2014 Ceal Floyer and Karin Sander, Paper Work, Galerie Esther Schipper
- 2014: Solides Fragiles, Musée d’Art Moderne Grand-Duc Jean, Luxemburg
- 2015: Künstlerräume, Staatsgalerie Stuttgart
- 2016 The Distance of a Day: Connections and Disconnections in Contemporary Art, Israel Museum, Jerusalem
- 2016: Karin Sander. Announcement, Esther Schipper / Johnen Galerie, Berlin
- 2017: Karin Sander. Zeigen. Eine Audiotour durch die Sammlung der GfZK Leipzig, Galerie für Zeitgenössische Kunst, Leipzig
- 2017: Open Codes. Leben in digitalen Welten, ZKM, Karlsruhe
- 2018: Karin Sander, Kunst Museum Winterthur
- 2018: Ausstellen des Ausstellens, Staatliche Kunsthalle Baden-Baden
- 2019: Karin Sander A bis Z, Haus am Waldsee, Berlin
- 2020: Karin Sander. Skulptur / Sculpture / Scultura, Museion, Bolzano
- 2021: NOTHINGTOSEENESS Void/White/Silence, Akademie der Künste, Berlin
- 2021: The point of sculpture, Fundació Joan Miró, Barcelona
- 2021: Hummings, KØS Museum of Art in Public Spaces, Køge
- 2021: Karin Sander, Kunsthalle Tübingen
- 2022: Fun Feminisim, Kunstmuseum Basel
- 2023: THE KING IS DEAD, LONG LIVE THE QUEEN, Museum Frieder Burda, Baden Baden
- 2023 Scale: Sculpture (1945–2000), Fundación Juan March, Madrid
- 2023: Neighbours, Schweizer Pavillon, 18. Internationale Architekturausstellung, La Biennale di Venezia, Venice
- 2023: Ideoscapes, i8 Gallery, Reykjavík
- 2024: Keep See, Keep Seeing, G Museum Nanjing, China
- 2025: Karin Sander, 494h 29m 53s, Akademie der Künste (ADK), Neuer Berliner Kunstverein, (nbk), Berlin
- 2025: GRAFFITI, Museion, Bolzano
- 2025: Habitate. Über_Lebensräume, The 16th Triennial for Small Sculpture Fellbach
- 2025: NO BOUNDARIES, National Museum of Art, NMAO, Osaka
- 2026 Karin Sander 1957-2057, Reykjavik Art Museum, Hafnarhús

=== Biennals / Triennals ===
- Habitate. Über_Lebensräume, 16. Triennale Kleinplastik in Fellbach (2025)
- Karin Sander/Philip Ursprung, Neighbours, Swiss Pavillon, 18th International Architecture Exhibition, Venice Biennial (2023)
- KölnSkulptur #7, Skulpturenpark Köln (2013-2015)
- Provisions for the Future and Past of the Coming Days, 9.Sharjah Biennial (2009)
- Scape, Christchurch Biennial of Art in Public Space (2008)
- Europa - Afrika, 7. Kleinplastik Triennale, Stuttgart (1998)
- Skulptur.Projekte Münster (1997)
- ORIENT/ATION – The Vision of Art in a Paradoxical World, Istanbul Biennale (1995)
- Construction in Process III: Back in Lodz (1990)

== Collections (selected) ==
Sander's work is in the collection of the Museum of Modern Art, the Metropolitan Museum of Art, the San Francisco Museum of Modern Art, and the National Gallery of Canada.

=== Public collections list ===
- Israel-Museum, Jerusalem
- Hirshhorn Museum, Washington, D.C.
- Kunstmuseum Bonn
- Kunstmuseum St. Gallen
- Kunstmuseum Stuttgart
- Kunst Museum Winterthur
- Lenbachhaus, Munich
- Lehmbruck-Museum, Duisburg
- Kunstsammlung Nordrhein-Westfalen, Düsseldorf
- Museion, Bolzano
- San Francisco Museum of Modern Art
- Staatsgalerie Stuttgart
- Sprengel Museum, Hannover
- The Metropolitan Museum, New York
- Museum of Modern Art, New York
- National Museum of Art, Osaka

== Bibliography ==
Monography

- Arch+, Kunst, Zeitschrift für Architektur und Urbanismus. 57. Jahrgang / April 2024, #255 Karin Sander, hg. von Nikolaus Kuhnert, Anh-Linh Ngo, ARCH+/Spector Books, Berlin/Leipzig 2024, ISBN 978-3-931435-82-0
- Arch+, Zeitschrift für Architektur und Urbanismus, 55. Jahrgang / September 2022, #249 Learning Spaces, Interview: Karin Sander, Tobias Becker, Grégoire Farquet, Momoyo Kaijima, p. 76-81, ed. by Nikolaus Kuhnert, Anh-Linh Ngo. ISBN 978-3-931435-72-1
- Karin Sander, Büroarbeiten Office Works; Kunsthalle Tübingen, ed. by Nicole Fritz & Karin Sander, Tübingen, Cologne: Verlag der Buchhandlung Walther König, 2021. ISBN 978-3-96098-985-1
- Karin Sander. Skulptur / Sculpture / Scultura, ed. Letizia Ragaglia, Museion, Bozen; Köln: Verlag der Buchhandlung Walther König, 2020, ISBN 978-3-96098-856-4
- Karin Sander. A–Z., Haus am Waldsee, Berlin; Köln: Verlag der Buchhandlung Walther König, 2019, ISBN 978-3-96098-440-5
- Randomly Selected Works. Karin Sander, ed. Nikolai Kunsthal Copenhagen; Akademie der Künste, Berlin, Copenhagen 2016
- Karin Sander. Museumsbesucher 1:8, ed. Marion Ackermann, Kunstsammlung Nordrhein-Westfalen, Düsseldorf and Raimund Stecker, Lehmbruck-Museum, Duisburg, Köln: Walther König, 2013, ISBN 978-3-86335-346-9
- Karin Sander. Ausstellungskatalog / Exhibition Catalogue, ed. Marius Babias, Neuer Berliner Kunstverein, Berlin; Köln: Verlag der Buchhandlung Walther König, 2012, ISBN 978-3-86335-072-7
- Karin Sander. Gebrauchsbilder, ed. Staatliche Kunsthalle Baden-Baden und Kunstmuseum St. Gallen, Nürnberg: Verlag für moderne Kunst, 2011, ISBN 978-3-86984-235-6
- Zeigen. Eine Audiotour durch Berlin von Karin Sander, Temporäre Kunsthalle Berlin; Köln: Verlag der Buchhandlung Walther König, 2010
- Karin Sander. XML-SVG CODE – Quellcode / Source Code, ed. Förderverein Museum gegenstandsfreier Kunst e.V. Otterndorf, 2010
- Karin Sander, ed. von Gudrun Inboden, Staatsgalerie Stuttgart; Ostfildern-Ruit: Hatje Cantz, 2002, ISBN 978-3775711623
- Karin Sander, Kunstmuseum St. Gallen; Ostfildern-Ruit: Hatje Cantz, 1996, ISBN 3893228918

Articles and Interviews

- Johannes Meinhardt, Karin Sander. Kunsthalle Tübingen, 27.03.-04.07.2021. In: KUNSTFORUM International, Vol. 275, June–July 2021, p. 285-287.
- Sabine Elsa Müller, Karin Sander. Unendliches Potential. In: KUNSTFORUM International, Vol. 230, December 2014-January 2015, p. 170-185.
- Claudia Posca, Karin Sander. Visitors on Display. Lehmbruck-Museum, Duisburg, 22.3-23.6.2013. In: KUNSTFORUM International, Vol. 221, May–June 2013, p. 297-299.
- Kimberly Bradley, In a Berlin Factory, an Artist Expands Upward. In: New York Times, January 12, 2011
- Rainer Metzger, Karin Sander. Staatsgalerie Stuttgart, 27.4. – 28.7.2002. In: KUNSTFORUM International, Vol. 160, June–July 2002, p. 407-409.
- Matthias Reichelt, Karin Sander. Die Perforation einer Kunstinstitution. n.b.k., Berlin, 5.3-1.5.2011. In: KUNSTFORUM International, Vol. 208, May–June 2011, p. 315-316.
- Benjamin Paul, Trace Value, in: Artforum, 56, No. 8, April 2018, p. 137–143
- Hans Ulrich Obrist (ed.), Interview Marathon Stuttgart 24./25. Juni 2005, Stuttgart: Institut für Buchgestaltung und Medienentwicklung an der Staatlichen Akademie der Bildenden Künste Stuttgart, 2006, p. 123–126
- Oliver Koerner von Gustorf, Counting Water, Collecting Words, in: The New York Times Magazine, No. 6, 29. September 2002, p. 48–51
- Hans Ulrich Obrist, In Conversation with Karin Sander, in: The New York Times Magazine, No. 6, September 29, 2002, p. 18–44
- Roberta Smith, Karin Sander, in: The New York Times, May 5, 2000
