= Francesc Torres Torres =

Spanish engineering professor and rector

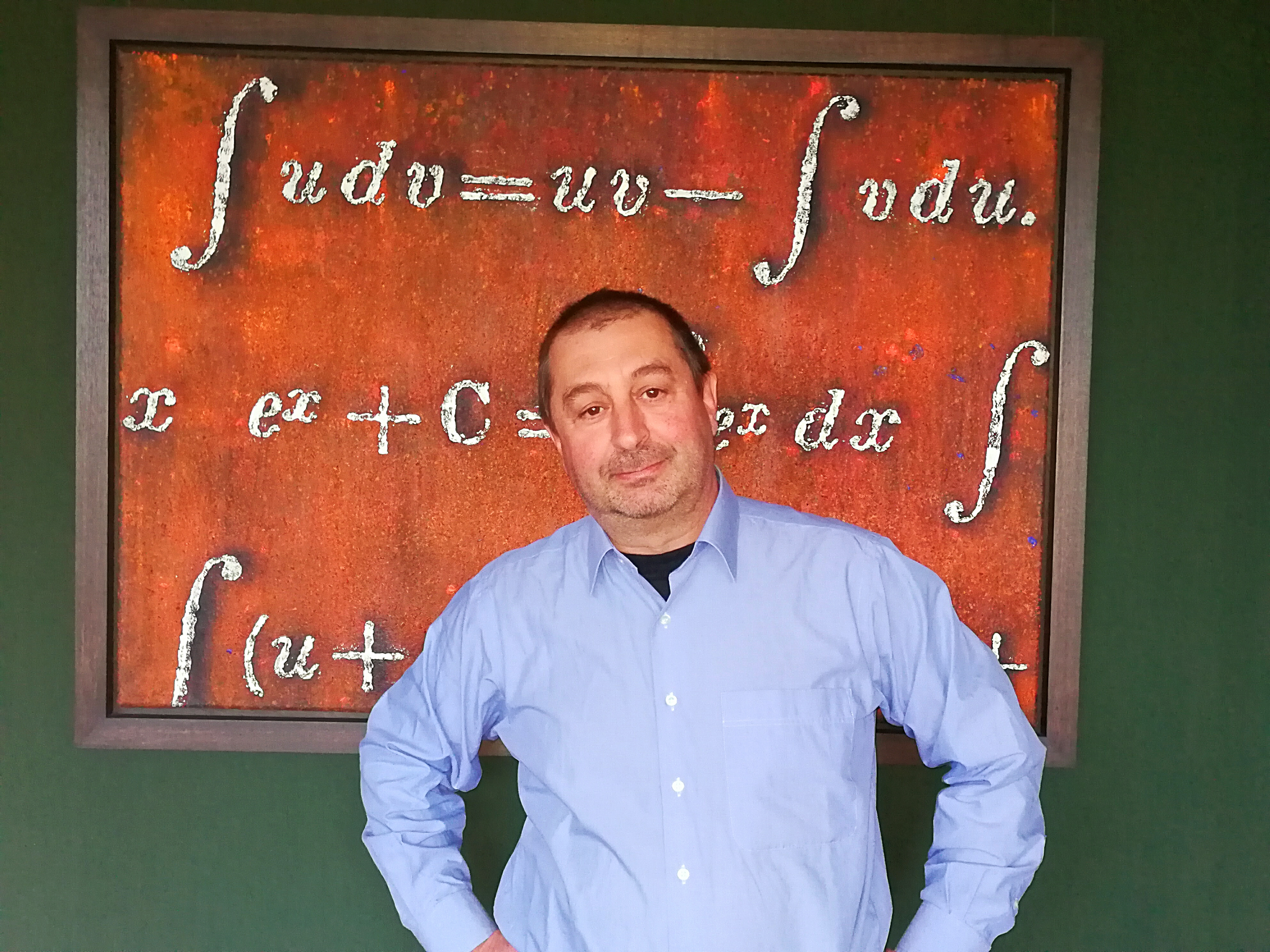
- Francesc Torres Torres
- Born: 1962 (age 63–64); Sant Joan de Labritja (Ibiza, Spain)
- Education: telecommunications engineer
- Alma mater: Universitat Politècnica de Catalunya
- Scientific career
- Workplaces: Universitat Politècnica de Catalunya

Francesc Torres Torres, also known as Xicu Torres, (born 1962, in Sant Joan de Labritja, Ibiza (Spain)) is a telecommunications engineer. He is rector of the Universitat Politècnica de Catalunya (UPC) since 2025. He was also rector of the same university from 2017 to 2021.

== Biography ==
Francesc Torres graduated in 1988 with a degree in Telecommunications Engineering from the Barcelona School of Telecommunications Engineering. He joined the European Space Agency (ESA) in the same year. A year later he returned to the UPC, where he began to teach and carry out research, earning a doctoral degree in 1992. He is a specialist in radiocommunications, high frequency circuits, and Earth observation. Within the UPC he has held several positions of responsibility. From 2005 to 2006, he worked at NASA while on sabbatical leave, as an advisor for the GeoSTAR project. He later worked as a scientific advisor in the remote sensing group RSLab, where he specialised in the development and subsequent monitoring of the ESA's SMOS sensor, launched in 2009, on the subject of which he has published more than 200 scientific publications. In 2010 he was appointed full professor at the UPC. He is currently a member of the UPC's CommSensLab, a 2017-2020 María de Maeztu Unit of Excellence.

In 2017, he was appointed rector of the UPC, having won 50.23% (1,854) of the weighted votes in the elections held in November of that year.

In June 2021, he lost his bid for reelection to candidate Daniel Crespo. However, in May 2025, he was once again elected rector of the UPC—defeating the incumbent, Daniel Crespo, in the first round—with 53.28% of the weighted vote. This time, the election was for a single six-year term, in accordance with the provisions of the new Spanish Universities Act (LOSU).

== Awards and distinctions ==
- 1997 - Teaching Improvement Award from the UPC's board of trustees for the Radiation and Guided Waves Laboratory (ETSETB)^{[1]}
- Since 2021, a street in Sant Joan, Ibiza—Carrer Rector Xicu Torres—has been named in his honor. In Ibiza, "Xicu" is the short form used for people named Francesc.
- As a member of the UPC's remote sensing research team RSLab:
  - 2000 - Duran Farell Award from the UPC's Board of Trustees
  - 2001 - Ciutat de Barcelona Award from the Barcelona City Council
  - 2004 - Salva i Campillo Award from the Association of Telecommunications Engineers
  - 2011 - Cristòfol Juandó Award in Aeronautics from the Barcelona City Council
