= Monika Brandmeier =

German sculptor

Monika Brandmeier (January 19, 1959 in Kamen) is a German sculptor.

== Life and work ==
Monika Brandmeier first studied visual communication at the Dortmund University of Applied Sciences from 1977 to 1982 and then at the Braunschweig University of Art and the Düsseldorf Academy of Art from 1986 to 1991. She was a master student of Erich Reusch. In 1995 she received a professorship for design theory and plastic design at the Fachhochschule Niederrhein in Krefeld.

Since 2001 she has been Professor of Sculpture at the Dresden University of Fine Arts.

Monika Brandmeier is spokesperson for the board of the Stiftung Kunstfonds and a member of the Deutscher Künstlerbund. She lives in Berlin.

== Prizes and scholarships (selection) ==
- 1983: Scholarship from the German-French Youth Organization, Paris
- 1986: Wilhelm-Fabry-Förderpreis from the city of Hilden
- 1987: Fellowship from the Pollock-Krasner Foundation, New York
- 1989: Guest of the Djerassi Foundation, Woodside, California
- 1990: Fellowship from the Philip Morris Artist Program, Berlin
- 1992: Scholarship from the state of North Rhine-Westphalia, Künstlerdorf Schöppingen
- 1992: Art Prize of the city of Nordhorn for sculpture
- 1998: Art Omi, Artist in Residence residency, Ghent, NY

== Works ==
=== Solo exhibitions (selection) ===
- 2021 A tropical atmosphere, only a lot cooler. ZAK Center for Contemporary Art, Zitadelle Spandau, Berlin
- 2020 mainly. Galerie Heike Strelow, Frankfurt a. M.
- 2019 Viewing. Kunsthalle Recklinghausen
- 2019 Neigung,. dr. julius | ap, Berlin
- 2017 Feststellung. dr. julius | ap, Berlin
- 2015 Weiches Licht - Neue Skulpturen und Fotoarbeiten der 90er Jahre. Gallery Conrads, Düsseldorf
- 2015 Sätze. dr. dr. julius | ap, Berlin
- 2014 Reflexbox, Galerie Mark Müller, Zurich
- 2012 Horizontalplastik, Galerie Mueller-Roth, Stuttgart
- 2011 Galerie Califa, Horazdovice, Czech Republic (with Martin Zet)
- 2010 Galerie Matthew Bown, Berlin
- 2010 Underplaying, Galerie Polaris, Paris
- 2010 Sachverhalt, Museum für Konkrete Kunst, Ingolstadt
- 2010 Double or Twice, Galerie Mark Müller, Zürich
- 2009 Sachverhalt, Leonhardi-Museum, Dresden
- 2009 Lock, Skulpturi.dk, Copenhagen
- 2009 Und alles Sehnen schließlich geometrisch, Galerie Conrads, Düsseldorf
- 2007 Bilder und Blicke /Pictures and Views, Museum of Contemporary Photography, Chicago
- 2004 Formatting Blick, Galerie Mark Müller, Zürich
- 2003 Galerie Polaris, Paris
- 2002 Platzwunder, Hochschule für Bildende Künste Dresden
- 2001 Volumen, Kolumba, Cologne
- 1999 Hamburger Bahnhof - Museum für Gegenwart, Berlin
- 1998 more lies and a line(with Jordan Baseman), Mario Flecha exhibition space, Girona, Spain
- 1997 21 Zeichnungen, Galerie Otto Schweins, Cologne
- 1996 Raum verpflichten (und vier Stützen), Städtische Galerie Ravensburg
- 1995 no ideas but in things. No ideas but in things. Zadnych idei poza rzeczami,(with Hartmut Böhm) The Artists'Museum, Lodz
- 1993 Albrecht Dürer Gesellschaft, Nuremberg
- 1992 R -5, L -6, James Hockey Gallery, Farnham, England
- 1992 Skulpturen Museum, Marl (with Claudia Terstappen)
- 1992 Der normale Aufenthalt im Freien, Städtische Galerie Nordhorn
- 1990 Joint exhibition - floating scale, (with Emiko Kasahara), Spiral Art Center, Tokyo
- 1989 sehr sehr - Raumkonzept VII, Kunstraum Buchberg, Austria (permanent installation)
- 1989 und ein paar Schuhe wie Anführungsstriche (unten), Galerie Schütz, Frankfurt a. M.
