= Xawery Wolski =

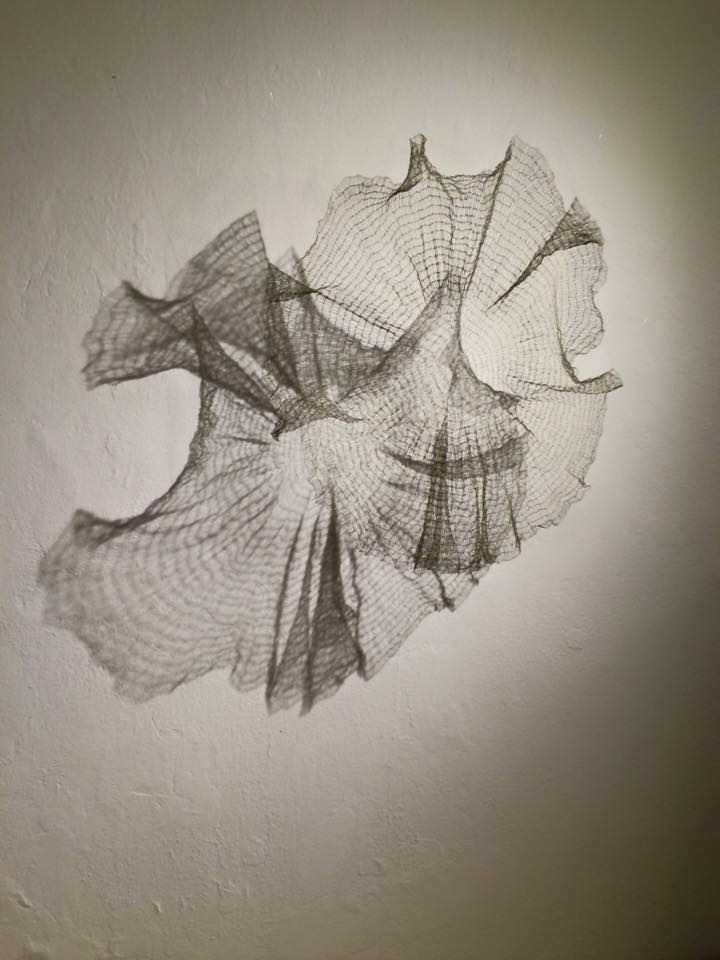
Air Circle, knitted wire. By Xawery Wolski

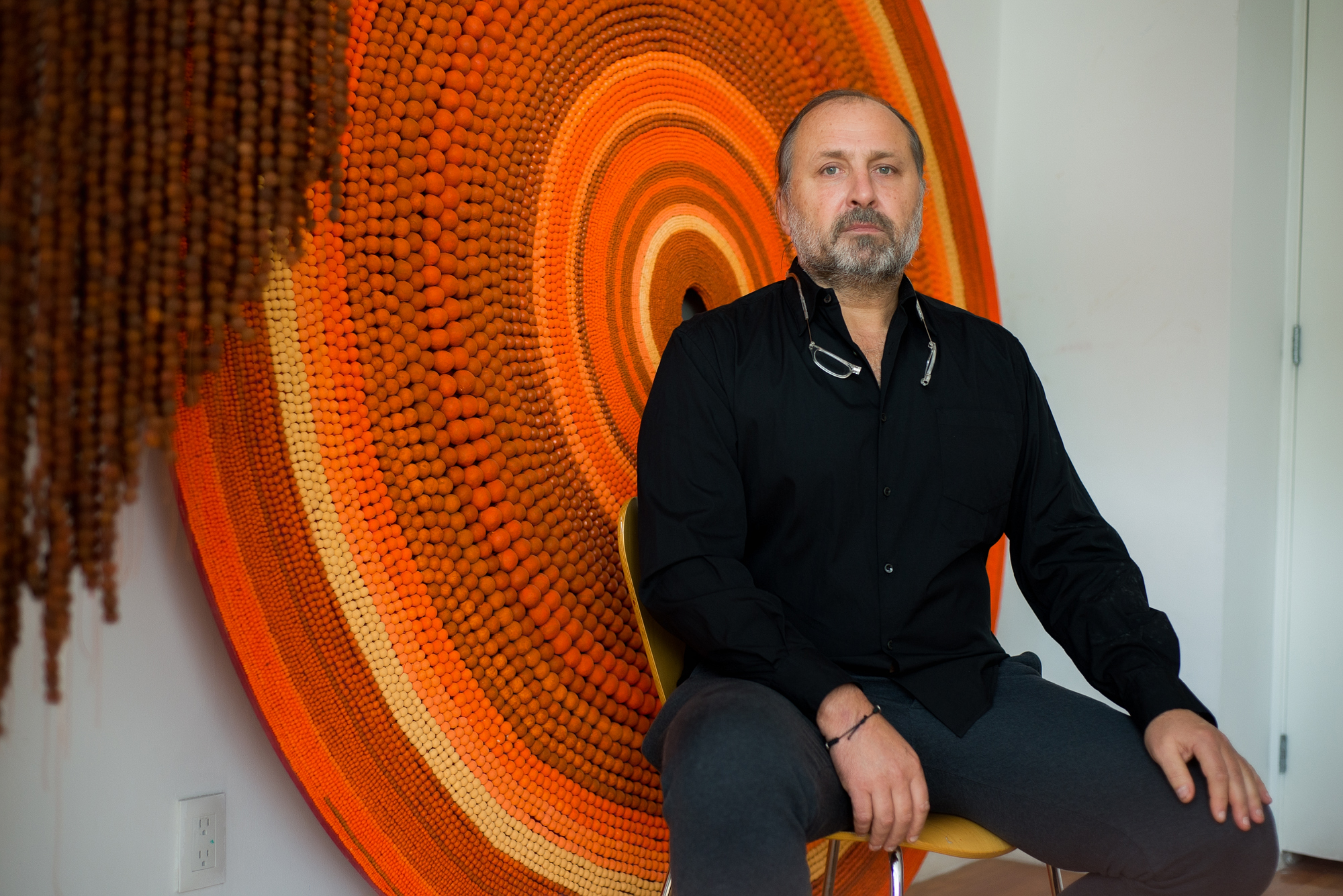
Xawery Wolski at his studio in Mexico City, 2017

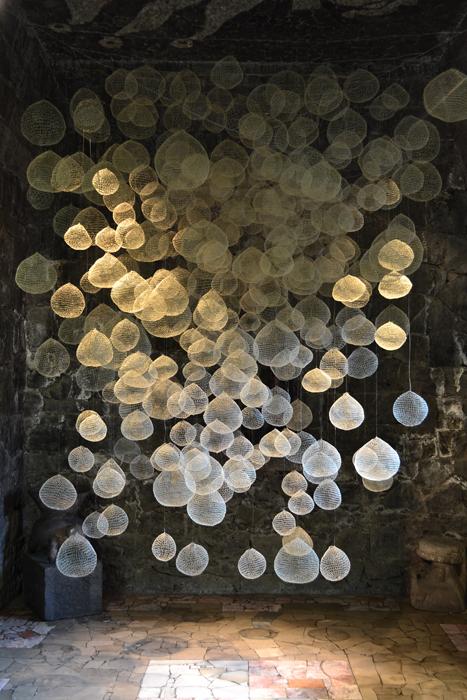
"Globos", knitted wire, 2010. Installed at Museo Anahuacalli, Mexico City

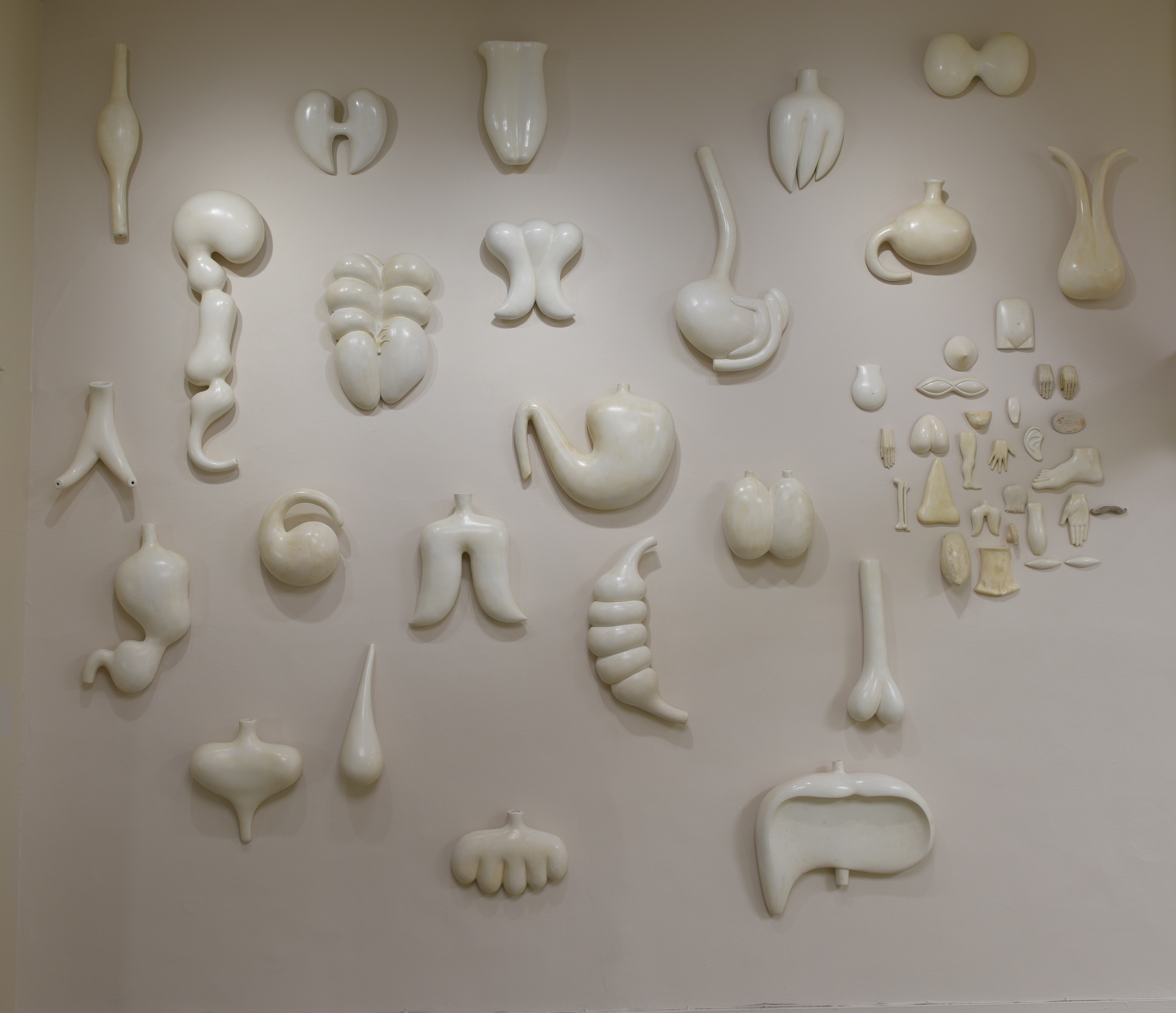
Organes (1999) installed in Musée de La Poste, Paris, France.

Xawery Wolski (born 1960 in Warsaw, Poland) is a Polish artist.

== Biography ==
Wolski's work is predominantly sculpture. Some of the projects he has undertaken in Mexico include; the sculpture "Infinity Chains" at the entrance of the Rufino Tamayo Museum, the series of works created for the Four Seasons Hotel in Punta Mita, and the Stelae arranged at Álvaro Obregón (at the exit of Metro Zapata) in Mexico City. Wolski created this work in collaboration with street children from the area with the help of the French Ministry of External Relations.

He has participated in many artist in residence programs, spent long periods of his creative time in Asia and India producing sculptures related to specific cultural and meta physical issues, made over seventy individual exhibitions throughout the world. Among them the Liu Haisu Museum in Shanghai, The Zachęta National Gallery of Art, The Lux Art Institute, Museo Carillo Gil, Museo Rufino Tamayo and Museo de Arte Moderno in Mexico.

== Work ==
The work of Wolski is characterized by a profound simplicity and consolidates a fusion between a remote past and the present. Wolski's work approximates an ancestral sculptural tradition in which he synthesizes simple forms and roughly geometric shapes in order to represent specific ideas and concepts. Notwithstanding this tradition and Wolski's use of antique techniques to create his sculptures, the artist has generated a body of work with a contemporary vision. His terracotta sculptures are related by organic and natural forms that he synthesizes and abstracts from their origin in eternal forms, and at the same times imbues with a complex spiritual and reflective energy.

Wolski's latest work conserves its abstract quality but subtly reveals the presence of the human form. By means of fragments of bodies and faces the artist invites the spectator to reflect on the smooth, white surfaces of his work, traditionally associated with the idea of peace and rest, but also suggesting distinct questions and meanings. Ongoing project of Infinity chains (2017), consist in a series of permanent sculptures in public spaces, among them in San Diego, California, US, Park Grotowskiego in Warsaw, Poland and the Kimpton Epic Hotel in Miami, Florida, US.

"I am interested in creating bridges of communication permitting past and present appear in unity and with hope that the dialogue in time and space continues in order for new configurations to be found".

Wolski was awarded a Krasner Pollock award in November 2007.
