= Wolf Kahlen =

German video artist (born 1940)

Wolf Kahlen (* 7 January 1940 in Aachen, Rhine Province) is a German video and performance artist who has been active since the 1960s. Since 1982, he has served as a professor of intermedia art at the Technische Universität Berlin.

== Career ==
Wolf Kahlen began his studies at the Braunschweig School of Art in 1960. From 1961 to 1964, he studied art education at the University of Art (HDK) in Berlin graduating as an art teacher, and a degree in American studies and Finnish at the Freie Universität Berlin in 1964. In 1962, he was a guest student at the Ateneum in Helsinki where he studied graphics under Aukusti Tuhka (August Tuhkanen) and held his first solo exhibition.

From 1965 to 1966 Wolf Kahlen resided in the United States on a scholarship from the German Academic Exchange Service (DAAD) and studied at Columbia University in New York and at the Pratt Institute. During this time he made acquaintances with Rudolf Arnheim, Allan Kaprow, Marcel Breuer and Richard Tuttle, developed basic plastic structures for room segments and was able to realize the UMBILDER-ROTARIES exhibition in the Goethe House Gallery in New York in 1966.
