= Edward Łazikowski =

Polish artist (born 1939)

Edward Łazikowski (born January 22, 1939, in Bąków Górny Poland) is a Polish artist whose work includes drawing, painting, photography, sculpture, installation art, performance art and art theory.

== Life ==
Łazikowski graduated from the Strzemiński Academy of Fine Arts and Design in Łódź. He presents his artistic and theoretical achievements publicly in individual exhibitions and taking part in collective shows in galleries and museums, publishing catalogues and articles in various magazines, and giving interview. Initially, he went in for painting (in the 1960s), then in the mid-1970s took interest in "actions" and photography (mainly documentary), and in the late 1970s and early 1980s performance art. Later on he created "objects" (sculptures): small constructions made of wood, string and fabric, which in time became larger, and sometimes became installations. An important part of his creative process is drawing, divided by the artist into three categories: free, working and note. Starting from the 1990s, he introduced a series of works called Fragtors. The term, coined by Łazikowski, and precisely described in his theoretical work Fragtoryzacja świata (Fragtorisation of the World), became the basis for artist's present plastic activities. In his theoretical and constructive works Łazikowski tries to combine discovering reality (science) with creating it (art). Łazikowski describes his aim as to carry out the "spiritualisation of his corporality (but not of the corpse), and corporalisation of his spirituality (but not of the spirit)." He sometimes exhibits his works outside galleries, at places unrelated to arts, not promoted by media and advertising campaigns; often outside the "field" of art.

== Individual exhibitions ==
- 1981: "Performance pikturalny", performance, Ślad Gallery, Łódź
- 1986: "Obiekty", wystawa i pokaz autorski. instalacja. Galeria Stodoła, Warszawa
- 1987: "2 instalacje i performance". Galeria Moltkerei-Verksttat. Kolonia, Niemcy
- 1992: "Teraz i przedtem". Muzeum Artystów, Łódź
- 1993: "Instalacje, obiekty, pokaz na żywo". Międzynarodowe Centrum Sztuki, Poznań

== Collective exhibitions ==
- 1981: "Panoptikon", instalacja, IX Spotkania Krakowskie, Kraków
- 1987: "Realizm radykalny i abstrakcja konkretna", National Museum Warsaw
- 1989: "Colori strappati - Oggetti presunti", Galeria Sala 1, Rzym, Włochy
- 1990: "Konstrukcja w procesie", Central Museum of Textiles, Łódź
- 1992: "Spotkanie i Tworzenie", Międzynarodowe Centrum Sztuki, Poznań

== Works in collections ==
- National Museum, Warsaw
- Muzeum Sztuki w Łodzi
- Museum of Fine Arts
- Pushkin Museum
- Polish Sculpture Center
- Muzeum Sztuki w Radomiu
