= Jenny Marketou =

Greek photographer, video artist (born 1954)

- Born: 1954 (age 71–72); Athens, Greece
- Known for: Multidisciplinary art
- Notable work: videos, photography, public interventions, web projects, video installation
- Movement: net.art
- Website: www.jennymarketou.net

Jenny Marketou (Athens, 1954) is a Greek multidisciplinary artist, lecturer, and author noted for her interventions and technology based projects.

== Biography ==
Jenny Marketou born in Athens, was educated in the United States and lives and works in New York. She attended the Corcoran School of Art in Washington D.C. where she studied sculpture and photography for her BFA, and earned her MFA at the Pratt Institute in New York City. Marketou has taught at the Cooper Union School of Art, The New School for Social Research and at CALARTS. She has received numerous international residencies, grants, and awards, as well as lectured, exhibited, and curated worldwide.

== Artistic career ==
Marketou's format spans performance, video, photography, interventions and internet projects. Her topics include the body and identity, public space, surveillance and hacktivism. Marketou defines "hacktivism" as "reconstructing a tool to understand its workings and to reconstruct it in a personal, creative way." In 1998, Marketou attended a three-month artist residency at Banff, where she met various artists associated with the net art movement. These meetings have influenced her work since that date. Streaming Raw includes video streamed in "real time" from two spy cameras in the Twin Towers prior to their destruction. In 2002, she participated in curating the show, "Open_Source_Art_Hack," at the New Museum. Marketou developed an interactive "smell map" that participants could create at the University of Pennsylvania's Science Center's show, "Odor Limits" in 2008. The map was called Smell It: A Do-It-Yourself Smell Map (2008) and it recorded the "shifting of the neighborhood's smellscape from one day to the next."

In fall 2024, Jenny Marketou was selected by ARTIT as one of the lead artists for Turning the Tide, a European cooperation project exploring ecological futures, feminist urbanism, and participatory public art. During a four-week residency in Vienna’s Seestadt Aspern, she developed In the Belly of a Garden—a site-specific, living sculpture anchored in and around a restored 120-year-old wooden Zille boat on Aspern Lake. The work transformed the lakefront into a space for collective memory, sonic ritual, and speculative storytelling, addressing water as a carrier of environmental and emotional knowledge. Supported by local partners, especially the Wiener Bildungsakademie (WBA), the project engaged residents through workshops, community gardening, performances, and seasonal ceremonies. As part of Turning the Tide, Marketou’s contribution reflected her enduring interest in public authorship, embodied research, and the politics of shared spaces, offering a poetic yet grounded response to questions of urban development and climate transformation

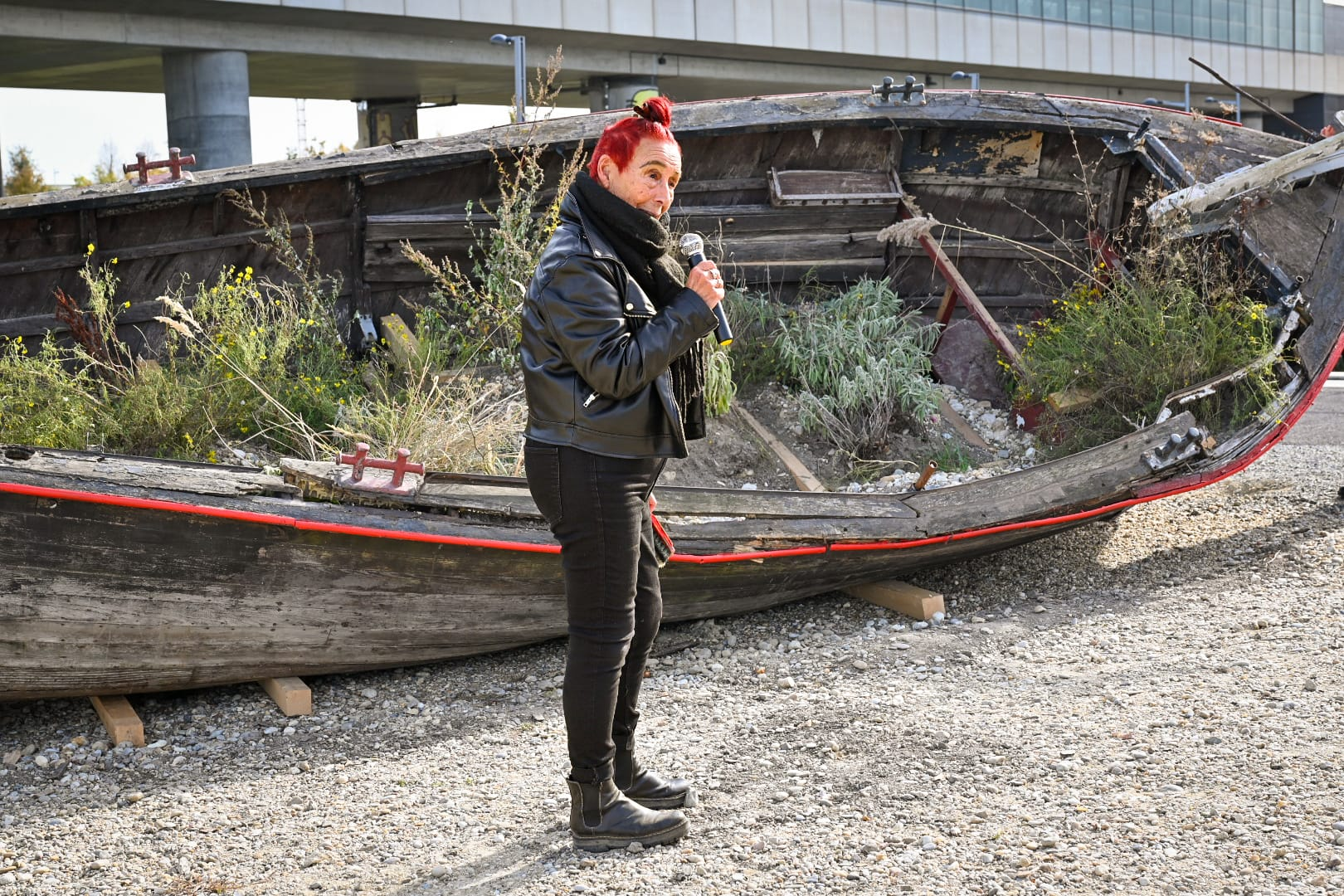

== Selected artworks ==
- 1998 SmellBytes, internet based installation.
- 2001 Taystes.net, internet art.
- 2011 Red Eye Skywalkers, public participatory artwork
- 2011 Paperophanies, a participatory performance at Artium Museum in Vitoria.
- 2012 Sunspotting, A Walking Forest. Intervention performance.
- 2013 Undoing Monuments, Hybrid participatory intervention.
- 2024 Inside the Belly of a Garden

Videos

- 2013 We Love Candy but Our Passion is Collecting Art (CCA),
- 2015 The Choir, 6.5 min.
- 2016 The Assembly in No Particular Order, 11.5 min., from Museum of Contemporary Cuts
