= Richard Nonas =

American sculptor (1936–2021)

- Richard Nonas in 2010
- Born: January 3, 1936
- Died: May 11, 2021 (aged 85)
- Known for: Minimalist art, Sculpture, Installation art
- Awards: Guggenheim Fellowship, 1974

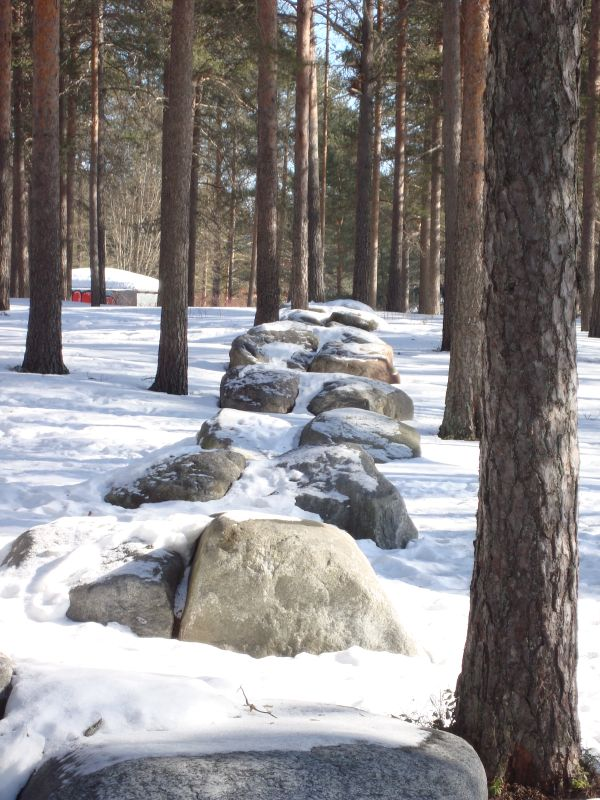
Richard Nonas, 55 meter long double-line of double-boulders (1997) Umedalen Sculpture Park

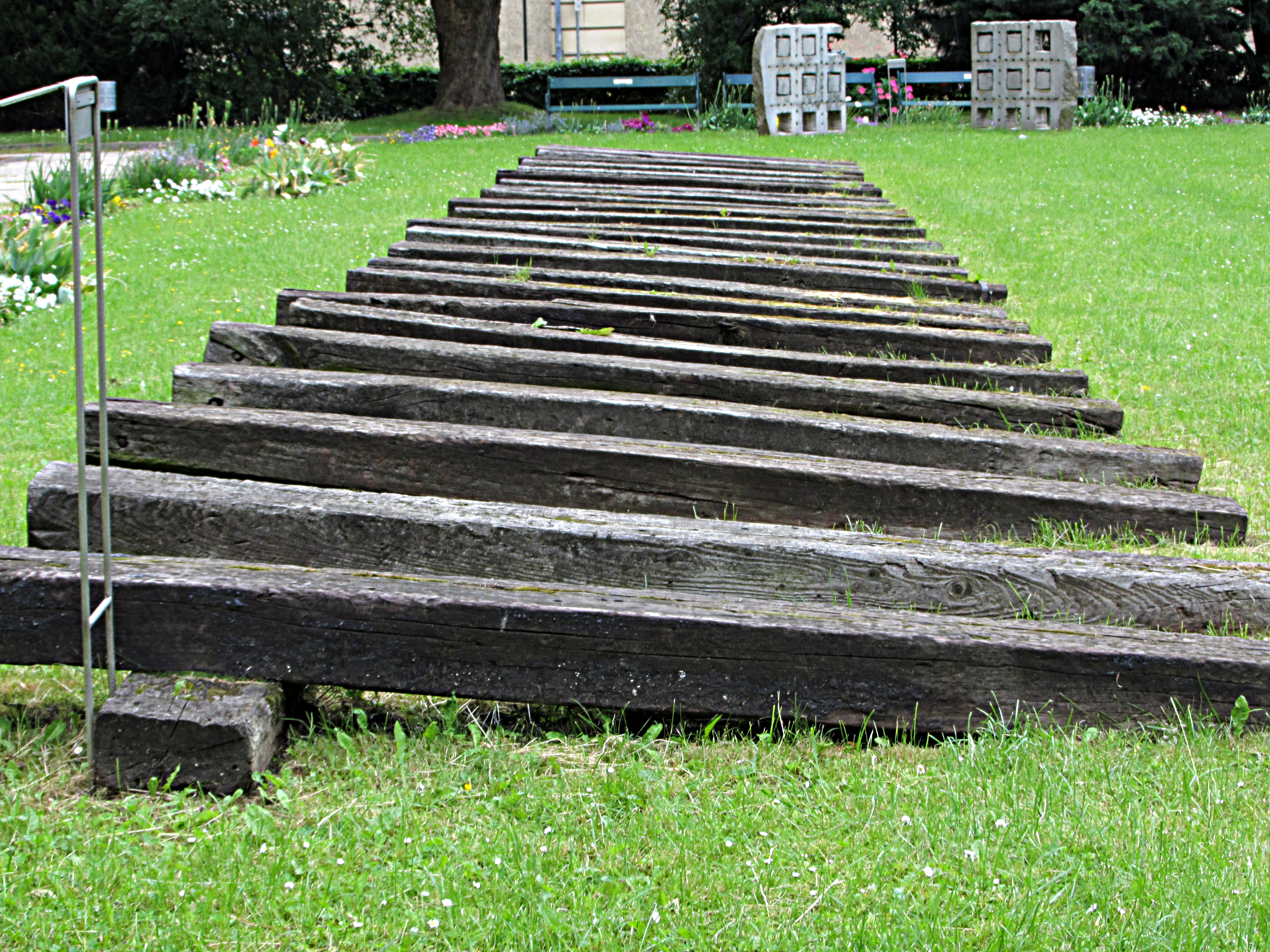
Richard Nonas, Bone Chaser, Linz, Austria

Richard Nonas (January 3, 1936 – May 11, 2021) was an American anthropologist and post-minimalist sculptor. He lived and worked in New York City.

== Education ==
Nonas was educated in literature and anthropology at University of Michigan, Lafayette College, Columbia University, and the University of North Carolina. He followed this with field-work studies on Native American sites in Northern Ontario, Canada, and in Northern Mexico and Southern Arizona before becoming a sculptor.

== Work ==
Nonas' Post-minimalist sculptural practice addressed notions of space, place, and deep time. His work from the 1970s involves experimentation with modes of presentation as well as material experimentation in which he used granite curbstones, linear wooden beams, and other raw materials. This work has been described as "talismanic objects" that create impressions of spiritual, emotional, and philosophical notions and meanings.

Nonas' oeuvre is known for modular sculptural installations, primarily in stone or wood, in interior and exterior settings. Carter Ratcliff wrote that "we cannot grasp a Nonas sculpture simply by thinking about it. His works call for intuitive, empathetic responses."

His work has been compared to that of Richard Serra, Joel Shapiro, and Dorothea Rockburne. His work has been exhibited internationally. He created a 300-foot-long installation in the U.S. at MassMoca in a one-person exhibition, Richard Nonas: The Man in the Empty Space. His work was featured in the 1973 Whitney Biennial. Courtney Fiske has written that Nonas treated "space as a material", in that each work is intended to be a "blunt insertion into the viewer's surrounds. His approach to minimalism not only includes serialiity, but also maintain a sense of self-containment and timelessness." Joyce Beckenstein writing for the magazine Sculpture, described Nonas' studio as a "Wunderkammer piled high with artifacts and relics as well as past and in-progress works....with the unexpected surprises of an archaeological dig."

Nonas stated that his travels impacted on his artistic practice, "What I realized in Mexico was that there are physical places, spaces deeply imbued with human meaning, that can have a great deal of power over us, places that affect us in an extremely worldly way." He described his sculptures as ways to define his own "existent reality, the reality I try to describe to you.

== Exhibitions ==
Nonas exhibited his work widely throughout the world, including shows in the U.S. at MoMA PS1, Museum of the Art Institute of Chicago, MASS MoCA, Walker Art Museum, among many others. Internationally, his work has been shown at Documenta 6, Kassel, Germany; the Musée d’art de Saint-Etienne, France; Musée d’Art Moderne et Contemporain, Geneva, Switzerland; Lund Museum of Art, Lund, Sweden; among other venues.

== Awards and honors ==
He was awarded a Guggenheim Fellowship from the John Simon Guggenheim Memorial Foundation in 1974.

== Public artworks ==
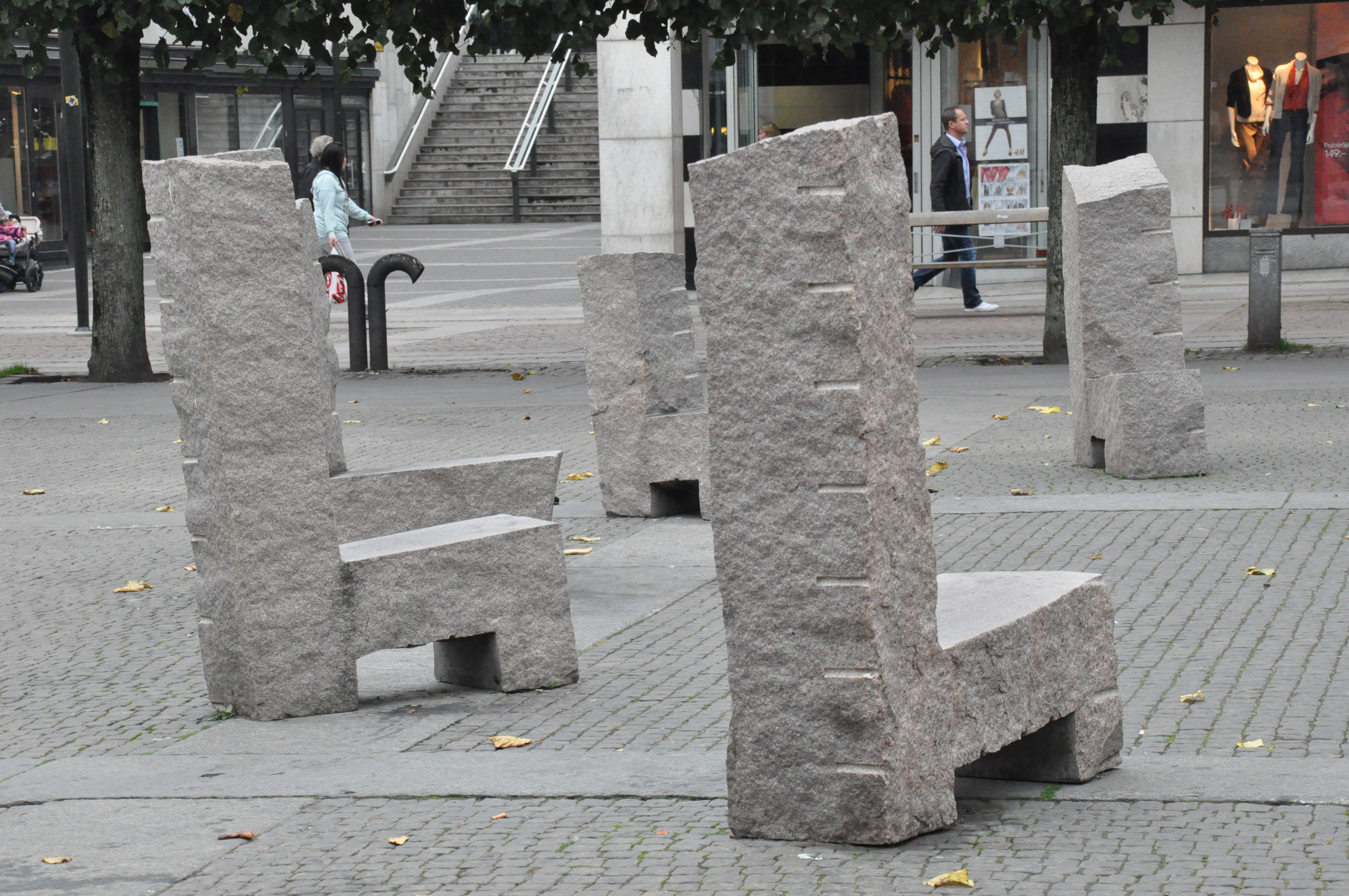
Richard Nonas, Borås Surround, Borås, Sweden

Nonas produced permanent public art works for the Museum of Grenoble, Transi West (for 36 Albanians ...), 1994; the North Dakota Museum of Art, Granite. In the early 1990s the North Dakota Museum of Art commissioned Nonas to design a sculpture garden and specimen peony garden for the museum. In 2012, at the abandoned village, Vière et les Moyennes Montagnes, Digne-les-Bains, France, he created a permanent installation.

== Collections ==
Nonas' work is included in the collections of the Walker Art Center, Minneapolis, Minnesota, the Metropolitan Museum, and the Whitney Museum of American Art among others. His work is also included in the permanent collection of the Fondazione Ratti, Italy.

== Bibliography ==
- 1998 Richard Nonas 1970-1988, Art and Architecture Books of the Twentieth Century.
- 1985 Kuspit, D. and Rosenzweig, P., Richard Nonas, Sculpture, Parts to anything, Nassau Country Museum of Fine Art, Roslyn Harbor, New York, 1985.
