= Michael Berkhemer =

Dutch artist

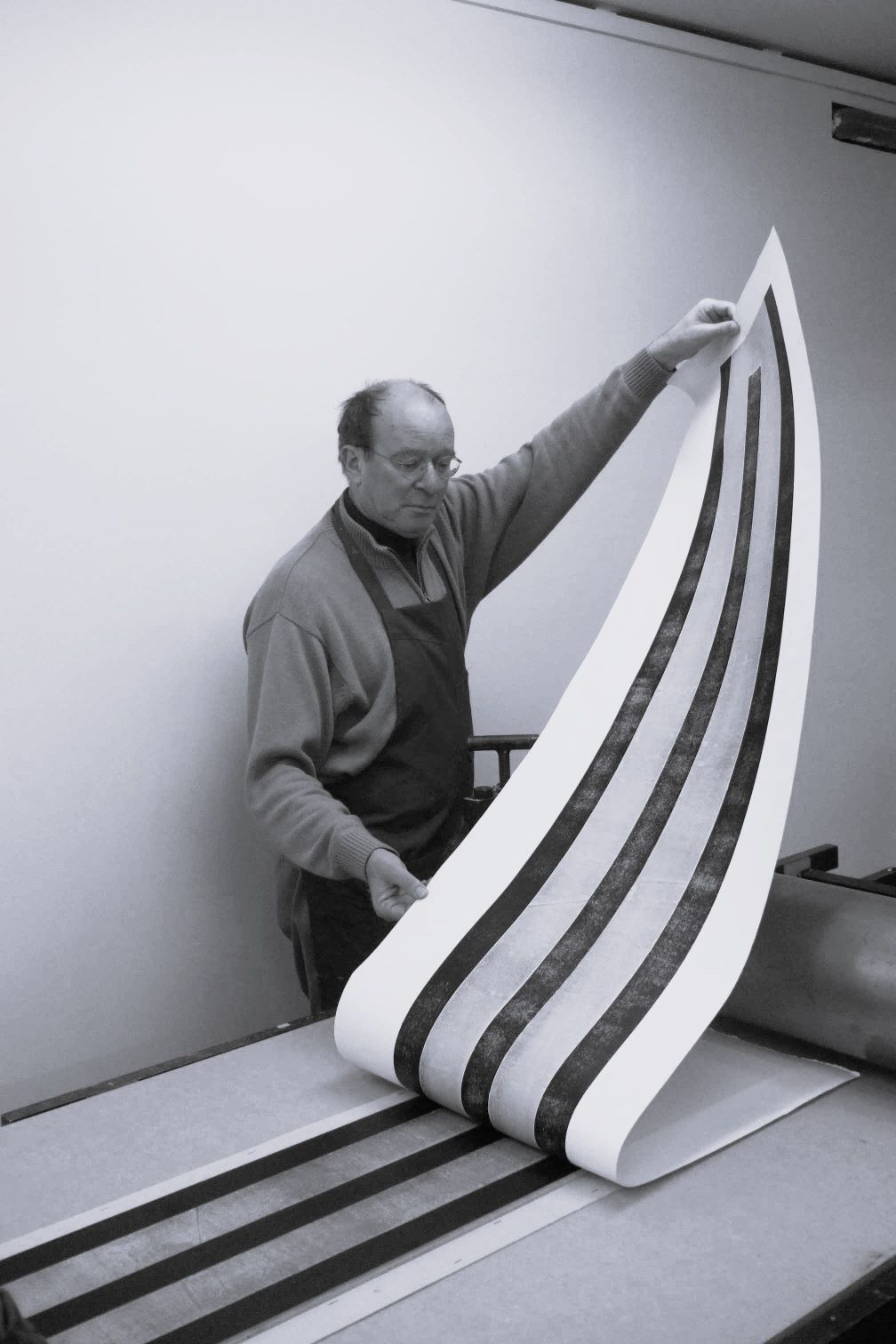
- Michael Berkhemer at the press with own print. Studio Graphic Collective Thoets, Amsterdam 2006 (photo Jan Baas)
- Born: 22 March 1948; Wageningen
- Died: 15 August 2022 (aged 74); Amsterdam
- Style: geometric-abstract (figurative until 1980)
- Website: michaelberkhemer.com

Michael Berkhemer (22 March 1948 – 15 August 2022) was a Dutch painter, graphic artist and creator of wall sculptures. His non-figurative art represents a tradition of its own, but is in line with American abstract expressionism and the material minimalism of Barnett Newman, Mark Rothko, Agnes Martin and Robert Ryman.

Berkhemer is the son of sculptor and reciter Willem Berkhemer (1917–1998) and Yvonne de Swarte (1920–2006) – who met while in hiding –, and the brother of harpist Mirte Berkhemer (1946–1979) and violinist, composer and conductor Joan Berkhemer (1951).

== Life and work ==
=== Early years ===
Berkhemer grew up in Wageningen and Arnheim in an artistic family. He began painting in oils at an early age, encouraged by his parents. At the age of seventeen, he was accepted at the Academy of Fine Arts in Arnheim. There he studied under Johan de Haas and became acquainted with the geometric and conceptual avant-garde of teachers such as Peter Struycken and Henk Peeters.

During his years at the academy, Berkhemer was mainly interested in figurative art. He was already receiving regular portrait commissions. His first solo exhibition took place in 1972.

In the early 1970s, Berkhemer established himself as a young artist in Amsterdam. He focused on dreamlike landscapes, female figures and still lifes in the spirit of Marc Chagall and Giorgio Morandi. In 1979, he moved into a studio at Prinsengracht 371, where he worked until his death in the summer of 2022.

=== Abstraction ===
From the 1980s onwards, Berkhemer abandoned figurative art and immersed himself in the expressive power of color and form. This step was partly a result of his growing interest in artists such as Claude Monet, Piet Mondriaan, Ellsworth Kelly and Rothko.

Berkhemer developed a highly personal, emotional abstraction, employing a consistently recognizable technique: colors were applied by hand, layer upon layer, to create a warm, uneven 'skin'; lines and planes were arranged into geometric patterns that appeared random but were carefully thought out. Monochrome sections, or sections in different colors of different sizes, are joined to form composite canvases without frames. This results in objects in which the boundary between painting and wall relief is removed.

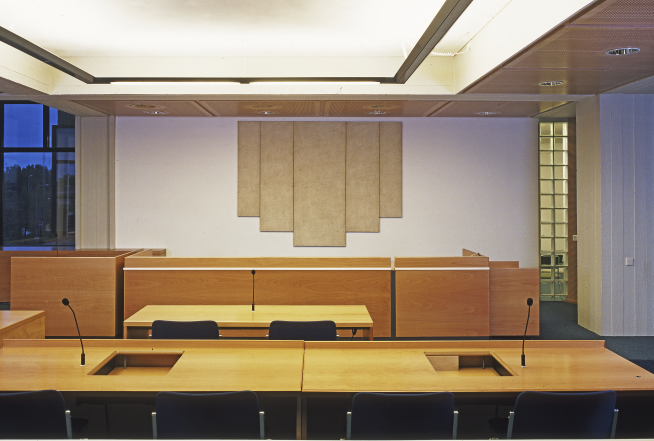
Untitled (pentaptych), 1992, acrylic on canvas, 170x222 cm, Court Amsterdam (photo Luuk Kramer)

Berkhemer was led down the path of abstraction by modernist trends such as color field painting, Mondrian's Neoplasticism and Peter Struycken's algorithmic geometry, but he does not work according to a theory or mathematical model. 'I don't have any special interest in geometry, and I don't base my work on mathematical principles,' he explained in 2008. 'I don't consider myself as a geometric-abstract working artist, in the way this definition is normally used. Of course straight lines and geometric shapes are prominent elements in my work, but only and strictly as the result of an organization, not as a goal. So geometry is an organization model.'

And: ‘Nature is an important source of inspiration for me. Without intending to imitate natural forms, I seek to represent the emotional impact of nature in all its manifestations.’ These manifestations also include landscapes and even cities and buildings, though they are man-made in terms of design and construction.

In preliminary studies on graph paper, Berkhemer first works out his ideas very precisely. Form and proportion, line and color are determined in this phase. From this, the final work of art emerges as a freer interpretation.

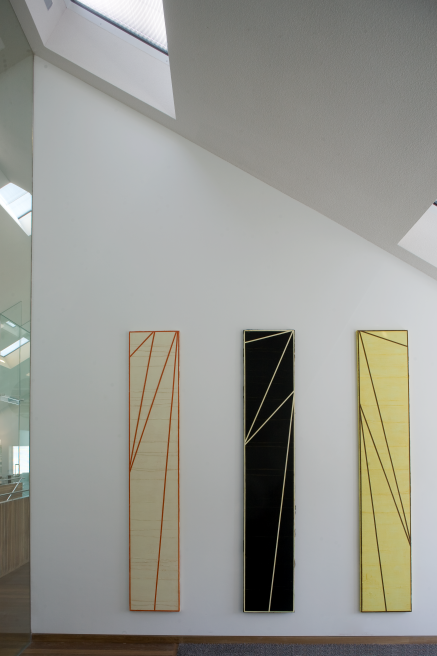
Three paintings, untitled, 2006, acrylic on canvas, 220x40 cm (each), corporate collection, the Netherlands (photo Luuk Kramer)

Berkhemer often varies on formal themes that develop into series. His rhythmic works with muted but sensuous colors define the space in which they are placed and transform the surrounding architecture.

=== The 1980s and beyond ===
From the 1980s onwards, Berkhemer travelled to the United States (Boston, New York, St. Louis), Italy (Tuscany, Umbria, Venice), France (Pyrenees, Giverny) and Indonesia. Nature, landscape, ancient and modern art make a big impression and remain a permanent source of inspiration.

In 1992, he joined Gallery Maria Chailloux, where he exhibited his work for 12 years. In the mid-1990s, he joined the Octagon group, whose members included Jac Bisschops, Riki Mijling, Martha Scheeren and Franz Immoos. They produced small editions of multiples, which were presented in the Netherlands and abroad.

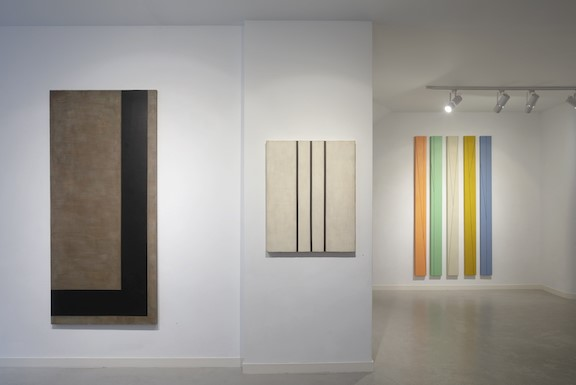
Paintings from 2012, 2017, 2018 (fltr), KuuB Art Space Utrecht, 2019 (photo Luuk Kramer)

After 2000, dozens of solo and group exhibitions followed in the Netherlands, Germany, Switzerland and the United States. Furthermore, Berkhemer is a member of the advisory committee for the Fund for Visual Arts, Design and Architecture and of various acquisition committees.

=== Wall sculptures ===
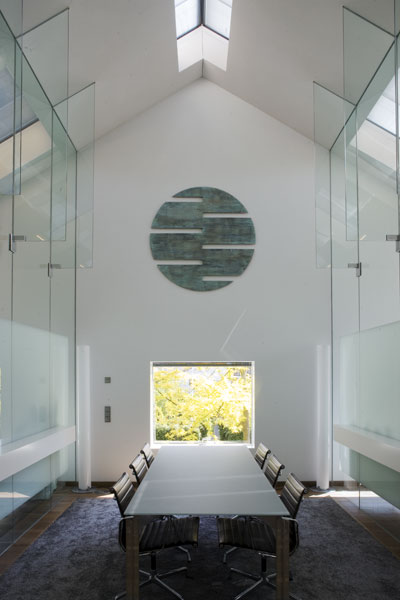
Wall sculpture, untitled, 2012, oxidized copper leaf on wood, 150x4 cm, corporate collection, the Netherlands (foto Luuk Kramer)

From the 1990s onwards, Berkhemer expanded his field from the painted flat surface (which only gives an illusion of space) to geometric sculptural wall reliefs and wall sculptures, which occupy a more tangible space. The organic-looking forms, sawn from wood, are often derived from what he observed in nature. The treatment of the material is the same as in the paintings: layer upon layer, color upon color.

=== Graphics and stay in the United States ===
Graphics have been an important part of Berkhemer's work for many years. In the 1990s, screen printing pioneer Hans Jansen encouraged him to make screen prints based on his own acrylic paintings. In 1996, he printed elliptical woodcuts in black and white at the studio of Amsterdam painter and graphic artist Ruben Herrera.

Three years later, Berkhemer visits the United States for a printmaking workshop led by painter and printmaker Peter Marcus, affiliated with Washington University School of Art in St. Louis. There, Berkhemer experiments with the collagraphy technique: very large prints that are assembled like a jigsaw puzzle, each print being unique (monotype). This is continued with Maryanne Simmons, master printer and founder of the Wildwood Press in St. Louis. In her studio, he further develops the process in intensive sessions between 2000 and 2011. The prints are mainly exhibited in the United States and are included in various (American) private and public collections.

In Amsterdam, at etching printer Eric Levert's studio, Berkhemer makes woodcuts of various sizes. In 2006, for example, he prints a series on gold leaf in small format.

=== Commissions and work in collections ===
Berkhemer has built up a versatile oeuvre and experimented extensively with various materials, techniques and formats. The focus is always on the balance between form and color, reason and emotion. The large formats of his canvases lend themselves well to corporate collections, public and government buildings and other locations. In 2000, he collaborates with artist Alexander Lichtveld to design the color scheme and the façade panels of the ‘Het Fort’ (The Fort) residential area in The Hague. In 2002, 2003 and 2008, he creates wall sculptures for three cruise ships, M.S. Statendam V, Serenade of the Seas and Solstice. He also devotes himself to textile design and creates book covers for Meulenhoff Publishers for writers and poets as Gerhard Durlacher, H.C. ten Berge, K. Michel and Primo Levi.

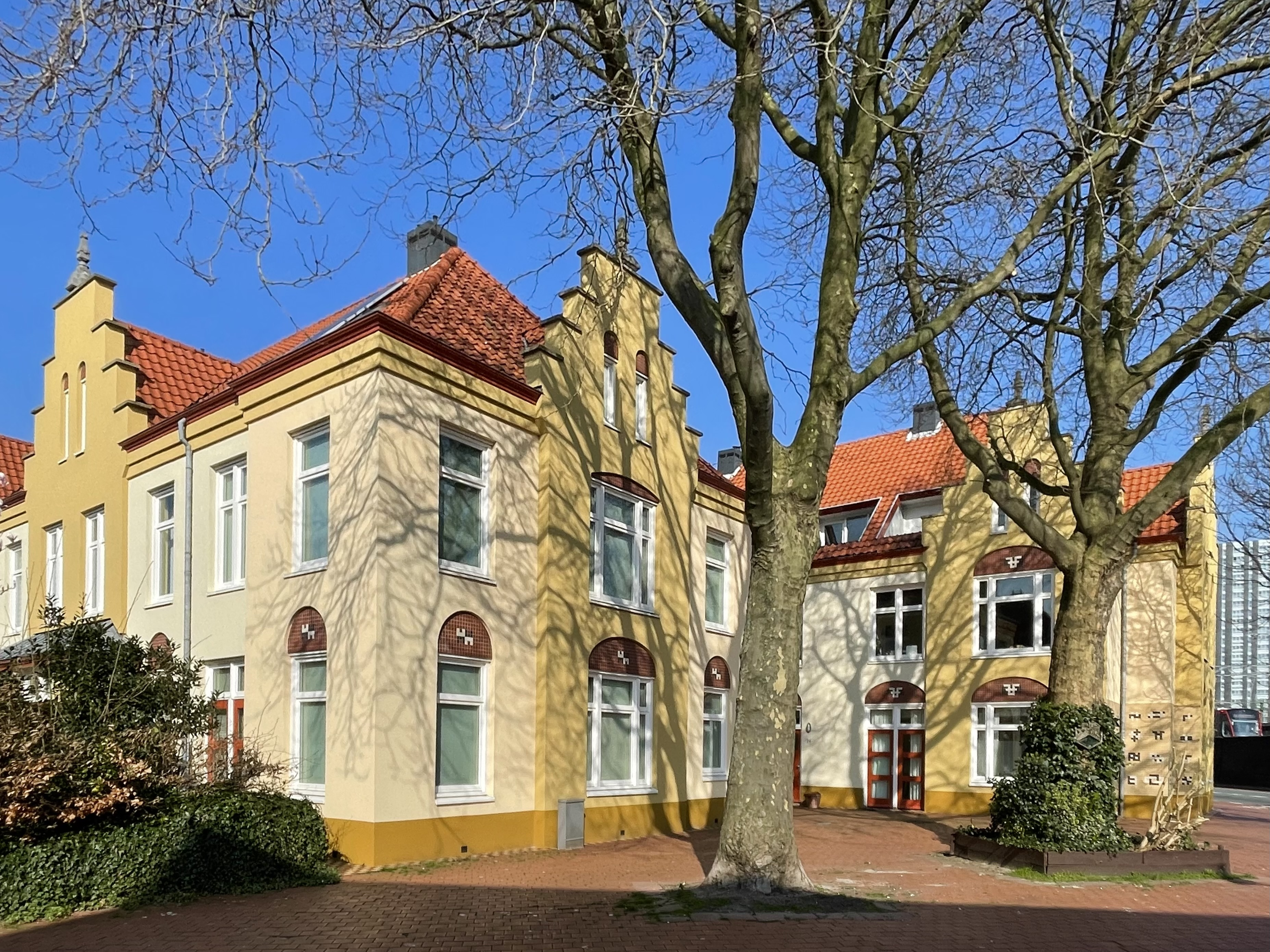
Michael Berkhemer and Alexander Lichtveld, color design and façade panels, 2000, residential area ‘Het Fort’ (The Fort), The Hague (photo Vincent van Zeijl, Wikimedia)

Berkhemer's work is included in the collections of museums, institutions, companies and private collections in the Netherlands and abroad.

== Statements by Michael Berkhemer ==
At first glance, my work could be placed in the geometric-abstract tradition, but on closer inspection, this is not entirely accurate. I do not use externally imposed mathematical principles or formulas; the organization of the image is an order in itself and has its own logic. Nor does my treatment of materials conform to the hard-edge technique of geometric abstraction artists. On the contrary, the countless thin layers of paint are applied in a loose, impulsive manner, creating a lively and transparent paint surface. Unquiet Calm!

— Statement for the Hague Art Circle, 2020

Choosing a color or a combination of colors is a completely instinctive process to me – there are no rules, no laws, no program. It has to do with emotion, the moment, the light, the weather outside. And the choosing of the color also has to do with the design, the visual story the print or painting is telling. One color is asking for another, the only thing I have to do is to listen and try to give the answer. Sometimes I am working with colors that are not always friendly to each other, but it’s great fun to bring them together in one work.’

— Statement about his graphical work, 2007

== About Michael Berkhemer ==
By conscientiously building up his paintings from many layers of paint applied with a fan brush, he creates a surface that shows traces of intensive and lengthy work. Berkhemer is not so much concerned with the intrinsic qualities of the material itself (as was the case with the so-called “material painters”), but rather with the transformation of the paint as a result of the interaction of colors, structures and forms. This “interference” results in harmonious and balanced paintings that are not only the result of a sober concept and rational action, but also a record of emotional involvement.

— Leo Delfgaauw, art historian

When Michael Berkhemer arrived in St. Louis to print with me, one thing was clear. We were going to need more paint and a strategy to get it on the plates in ways never seen before. House paint rollers seemed to be in order – dozens of them. And what – thirty, forty pounds of ink in five days? It was not printing for the faint at heart – wet on wet, sliding plates, and paper so big and heavy with ink that Michael’s subsequent visits to Wildwood Press would be forever known as the Big Paper Rodeo.’

— Maryanne Simmons, master printer and founder of Wildwood Press

Since the eighties, Berkhemer has developed a cohesive abstract idiom, the character of which was determined to some extent by his switch from oil to acrylic paints, which dry much faster. Acrylic enabled him to add many transparent layers, one over the other, without losing much time and thus to enrich his colors and achieve a subtle effect in the paint surface.

Initially, he avoided outlining the color planes too strictly, which contributed to his work having a more painterly effect than was customary in geometric art. Accordingly, a collector who was a keen advocate of geometric art reproached him: ‘‘Aber Sie sind ein Maler!’’ (‘‘But you’re a painter!’’)

And so he was, and continued to be.’

— Evert van Uitert, professor emeritus of modern art, University of Amsterdam

Frequently, the ascending lines of these compositions invite associations with natural forms, such as plants or trees. They seem to create a closer connection between the impulses from reality that Berkhemer seeks to transform and the resulting work of art. The viewer is tempted to alter this perception of a painting from abstract object to representation of nature.
While Berkhemer did not aim to use figurative imagery, he is not bothered by such an interpretation of his work. He appreciates, for example, the interest of a collector of representational art who sees a rendering of natural, treelike forms in a particular painting. In a way, it validates Berkhemer’s claim that he is not an abstract painter, since his art is derived from a visual world, albeit within a non-figurative vocabulary.’

— Cornelia Homburg, art historian

== Exhibitions (selection) ==
=== Solo exhibitions ===
- 2022 Art The Hague
- 2021 Jan Six Fine Art, Amsterdam, The Netherlands
- 2019 Kunstruimte KuuB, Utrecht, The Netherlands
- 2016 Unquiet Calm, S1 Gallery, Amsterdam, The Netherlands
- 2015 Minder/meer (Less/More), Galerie Oranjerie, Amsterdam, The Netherlands
- 2013-2014 Thema's & Variaties (Themes and Variations), Landgoed Leusderend, Leusden, The Netherlands
- 2008-2009 Michael Berkhemer. Retrospective, Museum Mondriaanhuis, Amersfoort, The Netherlands
- 2007 Galerie Billing Bild, Baar, Switzerland; A Print Retrospective, Wildwood Press, St. Louis, Missouri, US
- 2005 Galerie Clement, Amsterdam, The Netherlands; Museum Waterland, Purmerend, The Netherlands
- 2004 Galerie Billing Bild, Baar, Switzerland
- 2001 Parallele Universien (Parallel Universes), Gruppe Grün, Bremen (duo), Germany
- 2000 William Shearburn Gallery, St. Louis, Missouri, US; Galerie Billing Bild, Baar, Switzerland; Ingenieurbüro Laqua, Bergisch Gladbach, Germany
- 1999 Galerie Maria Chailloux, Amsterdam (duo), The Netherlands; Nicolette Brink Kunstzaken, Nieuwerbrug (duo), The Netherlands
- 1997 Interferenties (Interferences), Museum Henriette Polak, Zutphen, The Netherlands; Het Oude Raadhuis, Aalsmeer, The Netherlands
- 1996 Galerie Maria Chailloux, Amsterdam, The Netherlands
- 1994 Galerie Maria Chailloux, Amsterdam, The Netherlands
- 1973-1993 Various solo exhibitions

=== Group ===
- 2024 Hommage to Michael Berkhemer and Gerard Höweler, SBK Amsterdam, The Netherlands
- 2020 Vier (Four), Haagse Kunstkring, The Hague, The Netherlands
- 2020 Contemporary Art Stuff - Collector's Selection II, Galerie Billing Bild, Baar, Switzerland
- 2018 KunstRai, Amsterdam, The Netherlands
- 2017 Seattle Art Fair, Seattle, WA US; INK Miami Art Fair, Miami, FL US
- 2016 Arti Salon, Arti et Amicitiae, Amsterdam, The Netherlands; INK Miami Art Fair, (Wildwood Press), Art Basel, Miami, FL US; Wildwood Press 20 Years, The Mitchell Museum, Cedarhurst Art Center, Mt. Vernon, IL US; This Art Fair, Beurs van Berlage (S1 Gallery), Amsterdam, The Netherlands; Natura Mystica, Kunsthal Almelo, The Netherlands (with Anutosh, Anya Janssen, Uwe Poth, Margriet Smulders a.o.); Museum Waterland Forty Years, Museum Waterland, Purmerend, The Netherlands (with Elizabeth de Vaal, Jaap Hillenius, André Volten, Ewerdt Hilgemann, Marian Plug, Piet Tuytel, Emo Verkerk a.o.); KunstRai (Galerie Oranjerie), Amsterdam, The Netherlands
- 2014 Natura Mystica, Landgoed Leusderend, Leusden (with Armando, Sjoerd Buisman, Heleen Cornet, Jimmy Nelson, Uwe Poth, Margriet Smulders a.o.); INK Miami Art Fair, Wildwood Press, Art Basel, Miami, FL US; Kleinbeeld (Small Image), Museum Waterland, Purmerend
- 2013 Het oog van de meester (His Master’s Eye), Museum Henriëtte Polak, Zutphen, The Netherlands (with Johan de Haas, Ramón Gieling, Roland Schimmel, Anne Semler, Judith Stolker, Albert van der Weide a.o.); Art Karlsruhe, Germany, (Bruijstens, Modern Art), Amsterdam, The Netherlands
- 2012 Mark Making, prints from Wildwood Press, Saint Louis University Museum of Art, St. Louis, Missouri, US
- 2011 Color Matters Part 3, Kunstruimte 09, Groningen, The Netherlands (with Linda Arts, José Heerkens, Alexandra Roozen, Martha Scheeren, Fabian Westphal a.o.); In abstracto, Galerie Artipoli, Noorden, The Netherlands; A printer's spotlight. 15 years of Wildwood Press, Gallery 210, University of Missouri, St. Louis, Missouri, US; Island Press. Three decades of printmaking, Mildred Lane Kemper Art Museum, St. Louis, Missouri, US; Printer/Publisher/Artist/Patron. Courtney Obata and Wildwood Press, Bonsack Gallery, St. Louis, Missouri, US
- 2010 Kunst Zürich (Galerie Billing Bild), Switzerland; Bagagehal Loods 6 Amsterdam, The Netherlands
- 2009-2010 Arti et Amicitiae Amsterdam The Netherlands
- 2009 Art Chicago 2009 Merchandise Mart Chicago, IL US
- 2008 Pulchri, The Hague, The Netherlands; Aqua Art Miami Wynwood District Miami, FL US; Art Chicago Merchandise Mart Chicago, IL US; Works in Progress/Prints From Wildwood Press, Faulconer Gallery, Grinnell College Grinnell, Iowa US (Curator Dan Strong)
- 2007 Art at the Hilton, Dubai, Emirate of Dubai; Art Amsterdam (Galerie Clement) The Netherlands; Wildwood Press/Ten Years Bennington College Usdan Gallery Bennington, Vermont US
- 2006 Convoi Exceptionelle, Galerie Maria Chailloux, Amsterdam, The Netherlands; Small prints from Graphics Now, Museum de Buitenplaats, Eelde and Voerman Museum, Hattem, The Netherlands; Flow, Satellite Fair, Art Basel Miami Beach (Wildwood Press) US; Galerie Clement, Amsterdam, The Netherlands; Art Amsterdam (Galerie Clement) The Netherlands
- 2004, 2005 Kunst Zürich (Galerie Billing Bild) Switzerland; Galerie Clement, Amsterdam, The Netherlands
- 2003-2008 Represented repeatedly at Art Chicago (Wildwood Press, St. Louis, Missouri), US
- 2003 Galerie Clement, Amsterdam, The Netherlands; De verborgen Kindertekening (The Hidden Children’s Drawing), Het Oude Raadhuis, Aalsmeer, The Netherlands
- 2002 Editions 2002, Chelsea (Wildwood Press) New York, NY, US; Grafiek Nu (Graphics Now) #10, Singer Museum, Laren, The Netherlands (with Carel Blotkamp, Dick Cassée, Sam Drukker, Klaas Gubbels, Diana van Hal, Sandra Kruisbrink, Raquel Maulwurf, Rinke Nijburg, Carel Visser, Co Westerik a.o.)
- 2000-2005 Represented with Group Octagon at Art Fairs in Frankfurt and Cologne, Germany
- 2000 Washington University Gallery of Art, St. Louis, Missouri, US; Into Gold, De Vishal, Haarlem, The Netherlands
- 1998 Color–Matter–Energy, De Nederlandsche Bank and Amsterdam University of Applied Sciences, The Netherlands
- 1996 Galerie Jansen en Kooy, Amsterdam, The Netherlands; Art Fair Stockholm (Galerie Jansen en Kooy) Sweden; Multiples, Galerie Maria Chailloux, Amsterdam, The Netherlands; Art Multiple, (Galerie Jansen en Kooy) Düsseldorf, Germany
- 1995 Bewogen Verleden (Eventful past), Museum Flehite, Amersfoort, The Netherlands (with Else Berg, Eli Content, Marlene Dumas, Wim de Haan, Frank Lodeizen, Mommie Schwarz, H.N. Werkman a.o.); Color–Matter–Energy, Kunsthalle Oberhausen, Germany; Groeten aan / Greetings to Dordrecht, Pictura, Dordrecht, The Netherlands
- 1994 KunstRai, Color–Matter–Energy (Galerie Maria Chailloux) Amsterdam, The Netherlands
- 1993 KunstRai (Galerie Maria Chailloux) Amsterdam, The Netherlands; Stichting 1940–1945, Headquarters Amsterdam, The Netherlands;
- 1992 Galerie Phoebus, Rotterdam, The Netherlands; Color–Matter–Energy, Galerie Maria Chailloux, Amsterdam, The Netherlands
- 1973-1991 Various group exhibitions

== Bibliography (selection) ==
- 2011 Color Matters 3, Stichting Kunstruimte 09, Groningen
- 2008 Cornelia Homburg (ed.), Michael Berkhemer, Amersfoort (Mondriaanhuis) / Zwolle (Waanders) (NL/Eng)
- 2007 Cornelia Homburg, ‘I am not a printmaker, I am a painter who makes prints’, Michael Berkhemer: A Print Retrospective, (Wildwood Press) St. Louis (MO)
- 2003 M. Visser, ‘Serenade of the Seas’, Kunstbeeld, 9 (2003)
- 2002 Grafiek Nu (Graphics Now) #10, Laren (Singer Museum)
- Hans-Joachim Manske, ‘Franz Immoos und/and Michael Berkhemer’, in: Peter-Jörg Splettstösser, 30 Jahre Gruppe Grün 1971-2001, Bremen
- 2001 Evert van Uitert, ‘Een kunstschilder die zijn objecten patineert met bladgoud (A painter who applies a patina to his objects using gold leaf)’, Kunstschrift, 45 (2001) 6
- A.W. Lloyd, ‘Art under the Arch’, Art in America, July 2001
- Faye Hirsch, ‘Make it Big’, Art on Paper, 6 (2001)
- 2000 Jeff Daniel, ‘Michael Berkhemer. Recent Works on Paper’, Saint Louis Post Dispatch, Jan. 30, 2000 Tino Stierli, ‘Abstraktion und Expression’, Neue Zuger Zeitung, Sept. 8, 2000
- Miranda van Ark, Het Fort. Schilderswijk behoudt karakteristiek complex (The Fort. City district retains characteristic complex), The Hague
- Robert Adam, Carol Robertson, Intaglio: Acrylic-Resist Etching, Collagraphy, Engraving, Drypoint, Mezzotint, London
- 1997 Antonie den Ridder, ‘Michael Berkhemer exposeert in Museum Henriette Polak. Schilden van gestold licht (Michael Berkhemer exhibits at Museum Henriette Polak. Shields of solidified light)’, Gelders Dagblad, Febr. 5, 1997
- Leo Delfgaauw, Interferenties. Schilderijen van Michaël Berkhemer (Interferences. Paintings by Michael Berkhemer), Zutphen (Museum Henriette Polak)
- 1996 Barbara Jonckheer, De kunstenaars van AXA-Leven (Artists of the AXA-Leven collection), The Hague
- 1995 Anne Matena, Bewogen verleden. Beelden van verstoord leven stilgezet (Eventful past. Images of disrupted lives frozen in time), Zwolle
- 1993 Fred Op de Coul, ‘Expositie Berkhemer in Heusden. Sterke beleving van materie en vormen (Berkhemer exhibition in Heusden. Powerful experience of matter and forms)’, Brabants Dagblad, April 19, 1993
- 1986 Eric Beets, ‘“Magische” gouaches in het KCB (“Magical” gouaches at the KCB)’, Alkmaarse Courant, Jan. 9, 1986
- 1976 Nico Scheepmaker, ‘Interview met/with Michael Berkhemer’, Avenue, April 1976
