= Franz Immoos =

Swiss-Dutch artist

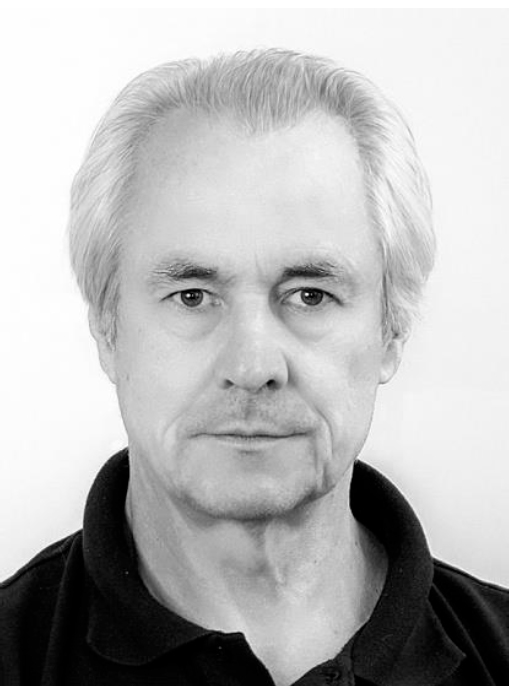
Franz Immoos 2

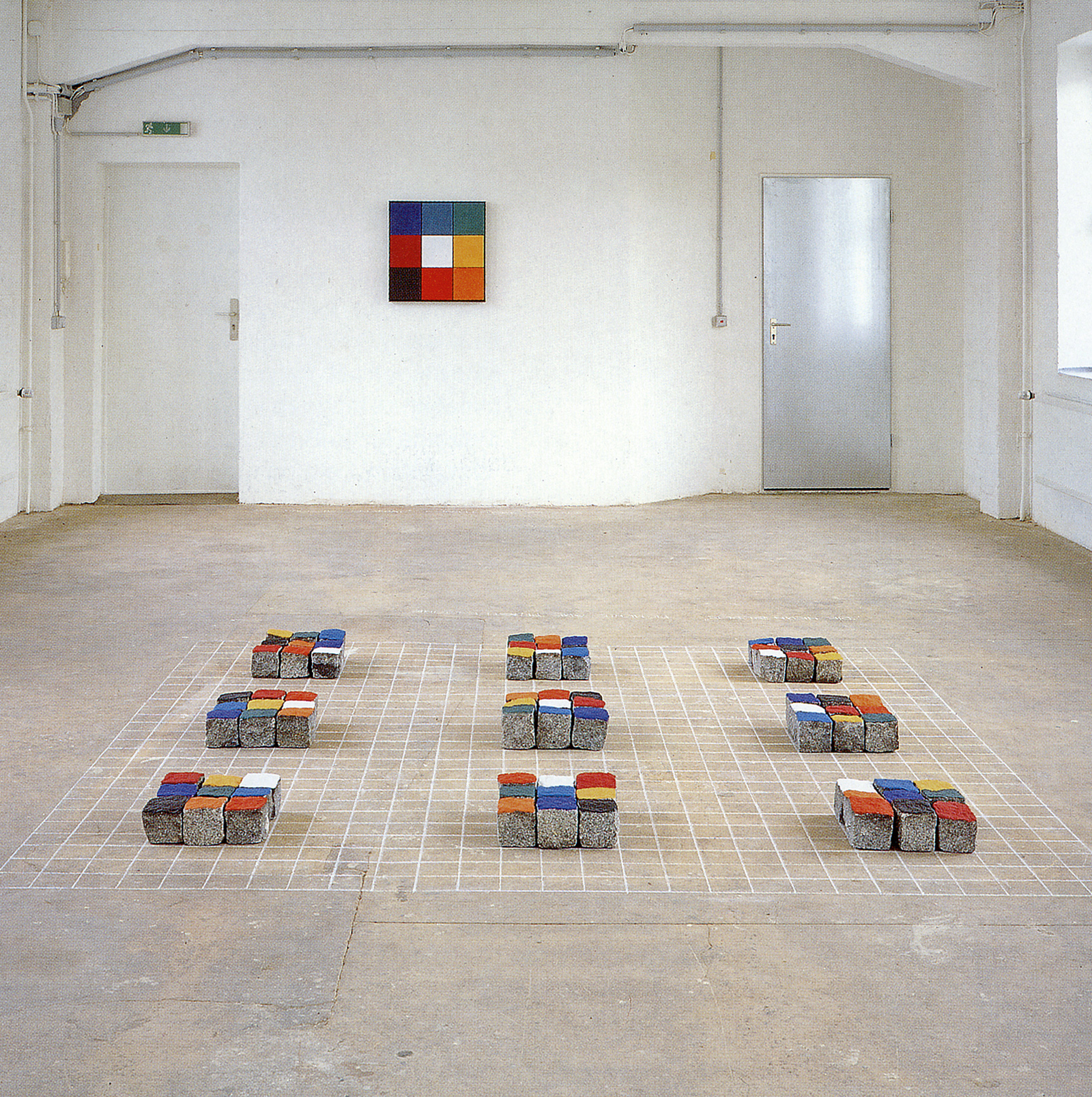
Die neun Bilder

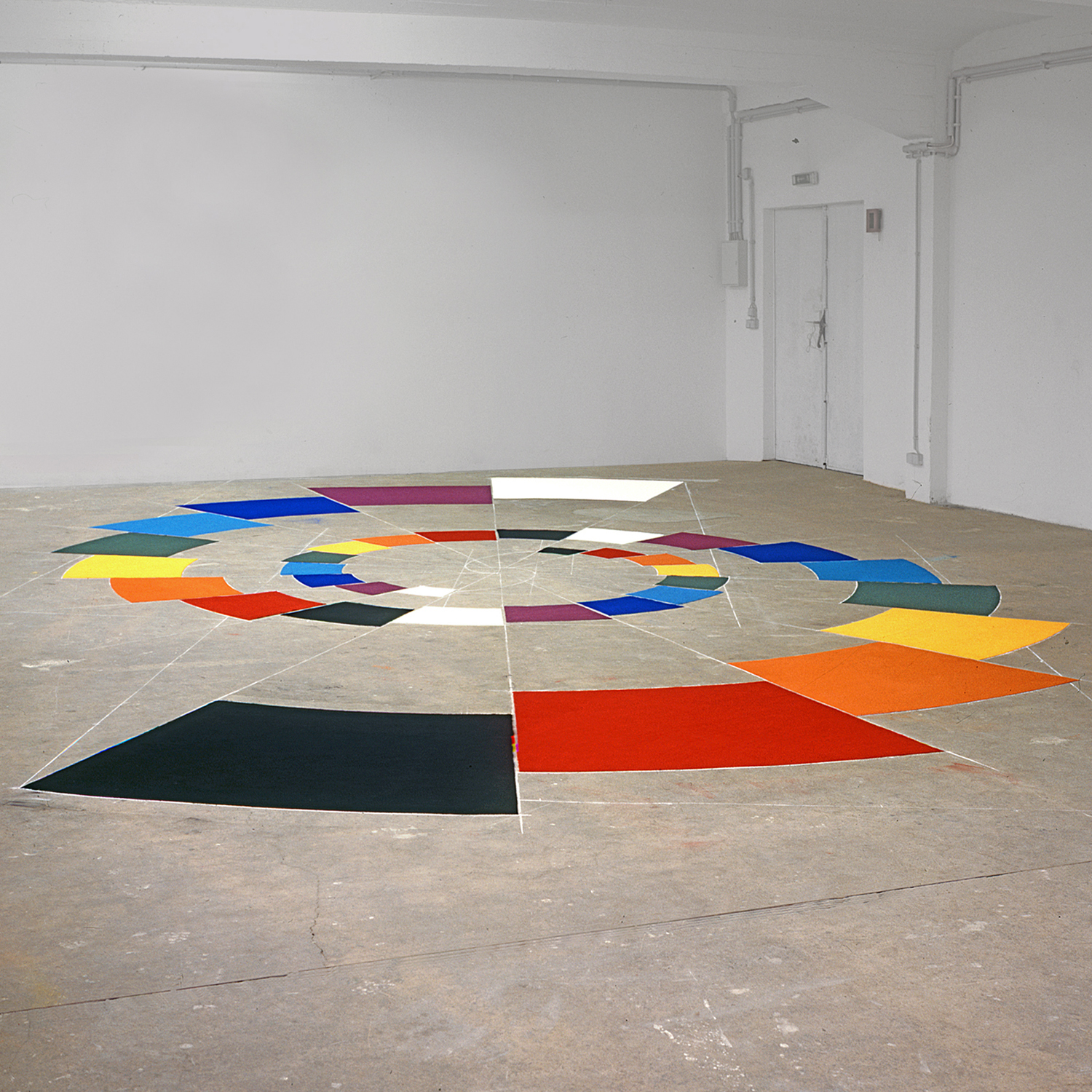
Farbtransformation

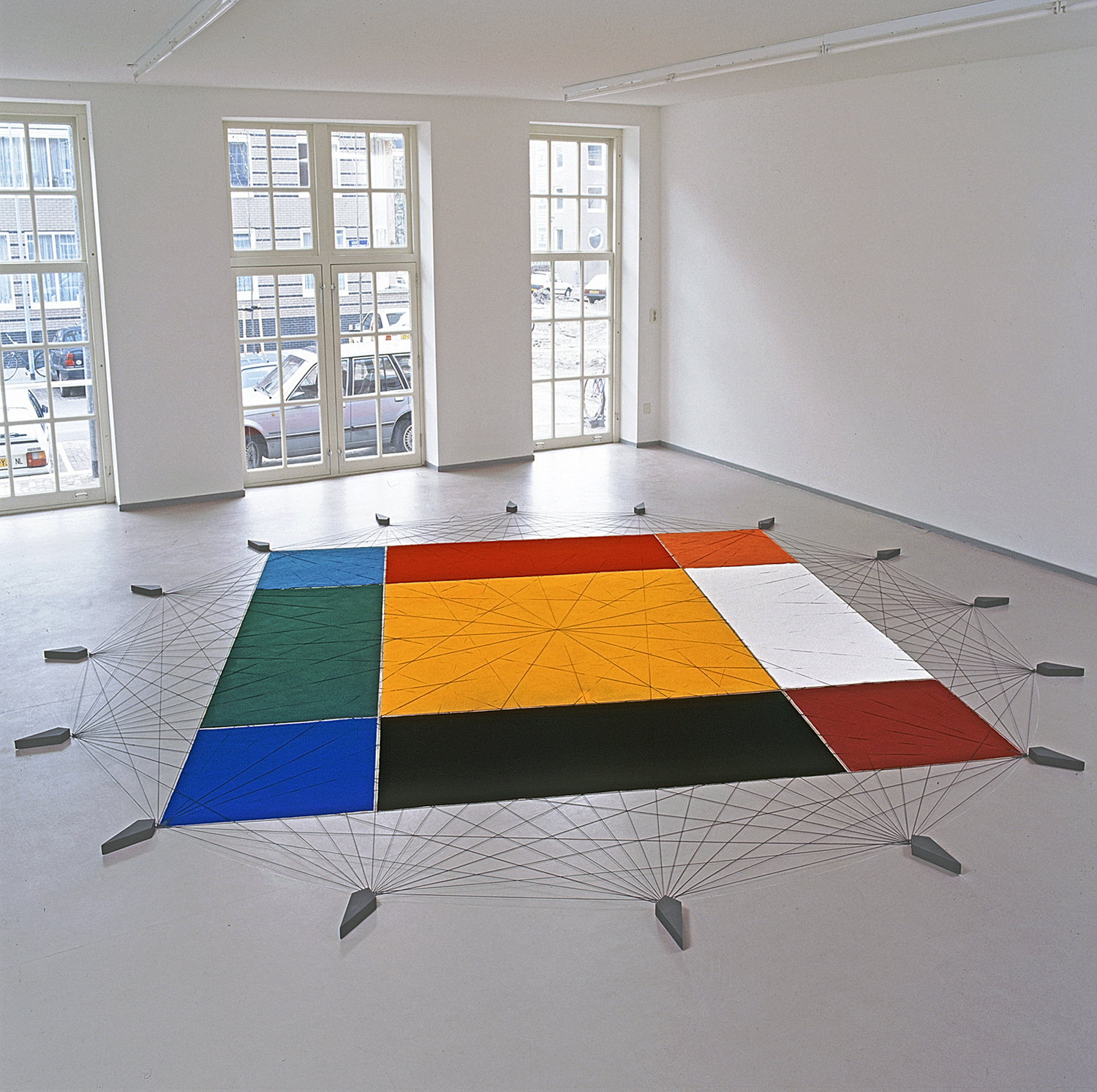
Die gelbe Halle

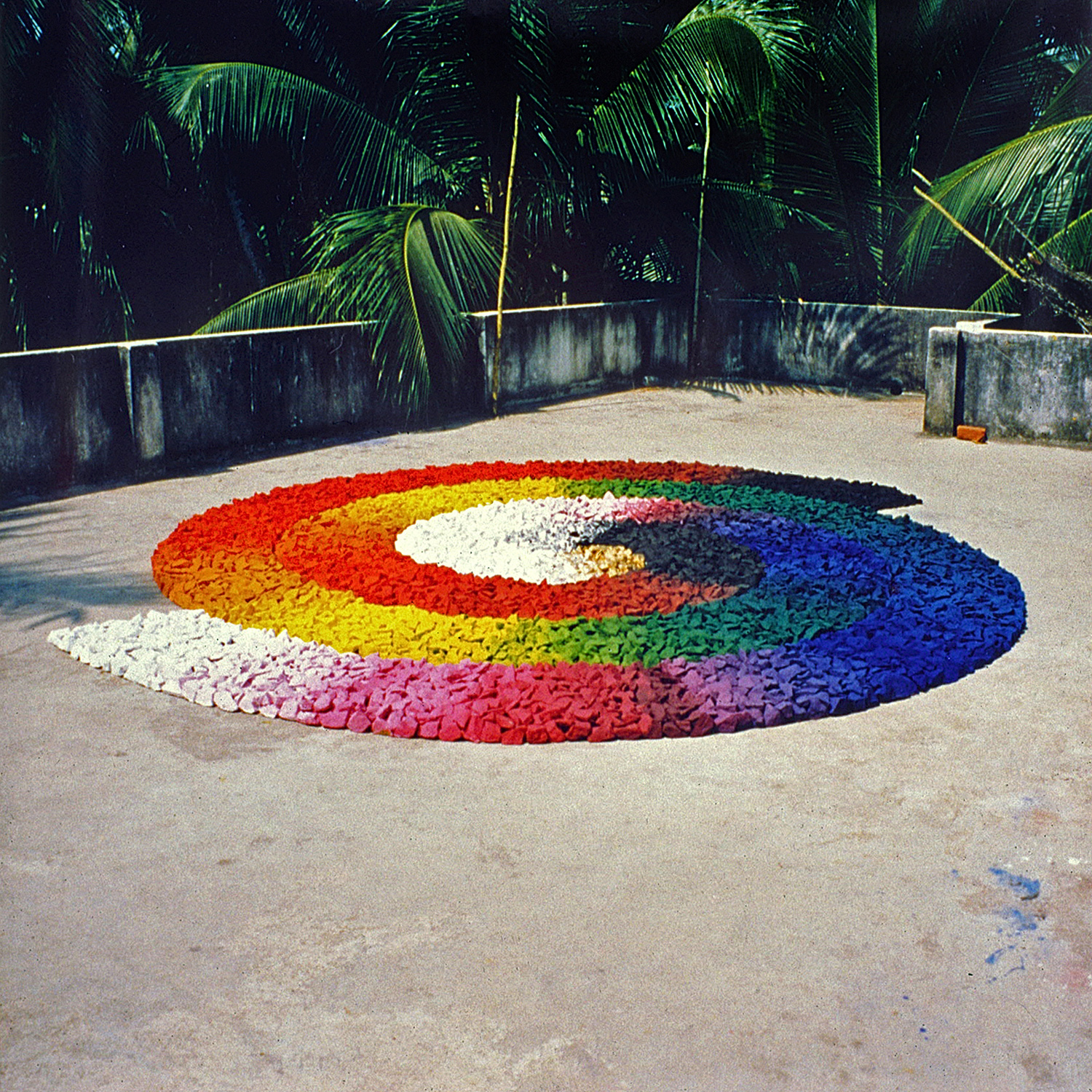
Farbtransformation 69

Franz Immoos (born 9 November 1948) is a Swiss-Dutch object installation artist and photographer. He was born in Menziken.

== Art education ==
Franz Immoos studied from 1972 to 1975 at the Fachklasse für Gestaltung at Kunstgewerbeschule Basel with the Swiss painter Franz Fedier. Then he spent time in Paris from 1976 to 1977 in a studio at the Cité Internationale des Arts, an artist residence and from 1978 to 1979 he attended the Visual Communication course at the Rijksakademie van beeldende kunsten in Amsterdam, where Immoos lives and works since 1977.

== Work ==
Immoos' artistic work offers object art, installations, photographic works, artists' books as well as theoretical treatises on colour and space.

Illusion objects, surfaces in space

The illusion objects are made of steel profiles or graphite plates. They are minimalist markings in space; illusions of geometric bodies such as cubes, elongated blocks, pyramids, etc. The figures are related to a 'fixed viewpoint' in space. This can be recognised by the fact that the figures transform into familiar bodies such as cubes, blocks, pyramids, etc. Upon releasing this 'fixed viewpoint', the plastic illusion is lifted. An interaction with the viewer occurs, challenging familiar habits of seeing.

Installations of these works were on show in:

- 1976 Gallery Stampa Basel, Switzerland
- 1979 Hester van Royen Gallery, London, United Kingdom
- 1979 / 1981 Gallery Lydia Megert, Bern, Switzerland
- 1980 Gallery Nouvelles Images, The Hague. Netherlands
- 1979 / 1980 Museum Fodor, Amsterdam. Netherlands
- 1987 Gallery Gruppe Grün, Bremen, Germany
- 1989 Gallery Schöller, Düsseldorf, Germany
- 1978- Collectie Nederland: Musea, Monumenten en Archeologie, Amersfoort, Netherlands

Colour objects, symbolic colours, installation (art)

Immoos developed his collection of artworks 'Symbolic Colours' in the tradition of a 'mathematical aesthetic' of the constructive and geometric tendencies of 20th-century art. As a Dutch and Swiss artist, he is indebted to the founders of the Dutch art movement De Stijl, such as Piet Mondrian and Theo van Doesburg, as well as to the virulent systematic investigations of colour by Swiss artists Max Bill and Richard Paul Lohse and the light kinetics of Hungarian-French painter and graphic artist Victor Vasarely – to name a few post-1945 movements. The fundamental difference with these predecessors is the symbolism Immoos envisaged in his colour fields. In almost all directions of concrete art of this century, which began with the black square of Russia's Kazimir Malevich, the referential function of colour is rejected. Colour is concrete; it has no pictorial or symbolic meaning. Immoos rejects this unquestioned credo. In a unique way, he connects the usual concrete use of colour in this century with its millennia-old task in religious cult.

These installations were exhibited in:

- 1983 "Materialisation" Triptychon, Kampnagel Fabrik, Hamburg, Germany
- 1991 "Farbtransformation" and "Die neun Bilder", Gallery Künstlerhaus am Deich, Bremen, Germany
- 1992 "Die gelbe Halle", Gallery Maria Chailloux, Amsterdam, Netherlands
- 1993 "Die fünf Wandlungen", Raum 1, Düsseldorf, Germany
- 1994 "Farbtransformation 69", I.C.C.D., Trivandrum Kerala, India
- 1995 "Cosmic 69", Hortus Botanicus, Amsterdam, Netherlands
- 1997 "Symbolfarben", Privatgrün-Stadtgrün, Projekt, Bremen, Germany
- 1997 "Om", Sanskriti Kendra, New Delhi, India

Photography (art)

In art photography, the medium of photography is used as a means of expression. In general, a photograph in art photography can also be called a work of art and should be understood as fine art. With such a definition, photographs are not faithful reproductions. In art photography, corrections can also be made to the image in the laboratory or on the computer, and there are no limits to the artist's creativity. The justification for photography as an art form was aptly given by Swedish art collector and museum director Pontus Hultén: "Photography is easy. But photography is a very difficult art."

What a person thinks and feels is captured in signs, symbols, images and photographs:

"Symbols come from our imagination; they transcend the boundary between rational and irrational thinking; they connect the unknown with the conscious. Images can be perceived and interpreted quite banally; but they can also be connected to transpersonal archetypal content."

Photographic works were on display in the following exhibitions and collections:

- 1981 "Erweiterte Fotografie", 5. Foto-Biennale, Wiener Secession, Vienna, Austria
- 1983 "Diptychon – Triptychon", Museum Waterland, Purmerend, Netherlands
- 1984 "Umgang mit der Aura", Städtische Galerie, Regensburg, Germany
- 1985 "Schweizer-Fotografie". Die Sammlung der Gotthard Bank, Lugano, Zürich, Switzerland
- 1986 "Diptychon – Triptychon", Galerie Ton Peek, Amsterdam, Netherlands
- 1999 "Photo Paris“, Gallery Pennings, Eindhoven, Netherlands
- 2000 "Nature matters", Gallery Resy Muijsers, Tilburg, Netherlands
- 2005 "Anima-Natura", Hortus Botanicus, Amsterdam, Netherlands
- 2011 "Kunstfrühling", Gruppe Grün, Bremen, Germany
- 2015 "Treffpunkt Worpswede", Heinrich Vogeler Museum Barkenhoff, Worpswede, Germany

Artist books

Artist books are stand-alone works of art that have usually made the book the subject of an artistic concept; in contemporary art, these concepts also transcend the boundaries of the book as an object.

"In photobooks (photocompressions), architectural fragments are phototechnically combined in transparent layers. Through old and new architectural elements and different perspectives, a new architectural structure is created. This irrational reality created by superimposing different architectural fragments in style and time is illusionary. A new, imaginary space is created that contradicts reality. On the one hand, this newly created space irritates rational thinking and, on the other, it certainly stimulates our imagination. The fragmentary randomness of these architectural ensembles is utopian and imaginary. Both the change and mixing of old and new architectural fragments create an untruthful image. The composition of unsuspected forms and altered perspectives result in unusual spatial dynamics. The depiction of the idea offers more than the image and suggests a new atmosphere. The atmospheric play of light and shadow, the staircase ending in nothingness, suggests allegorical, metaphorical content. The resulting fantasy construction forms analogies with dream images.

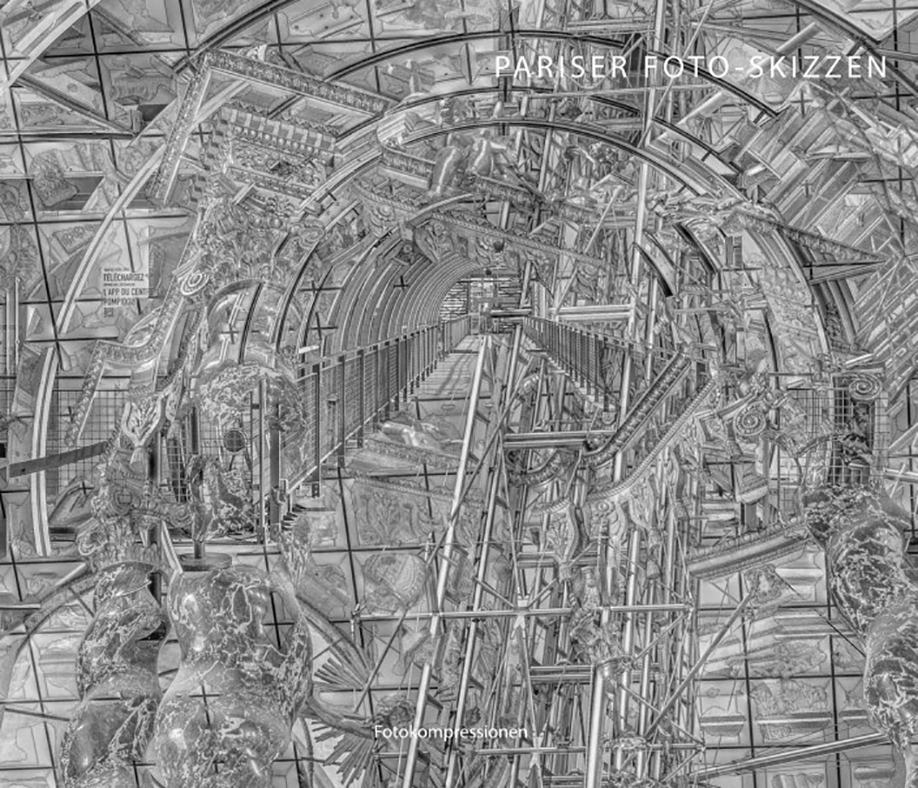
Pariser Fotoskizzen

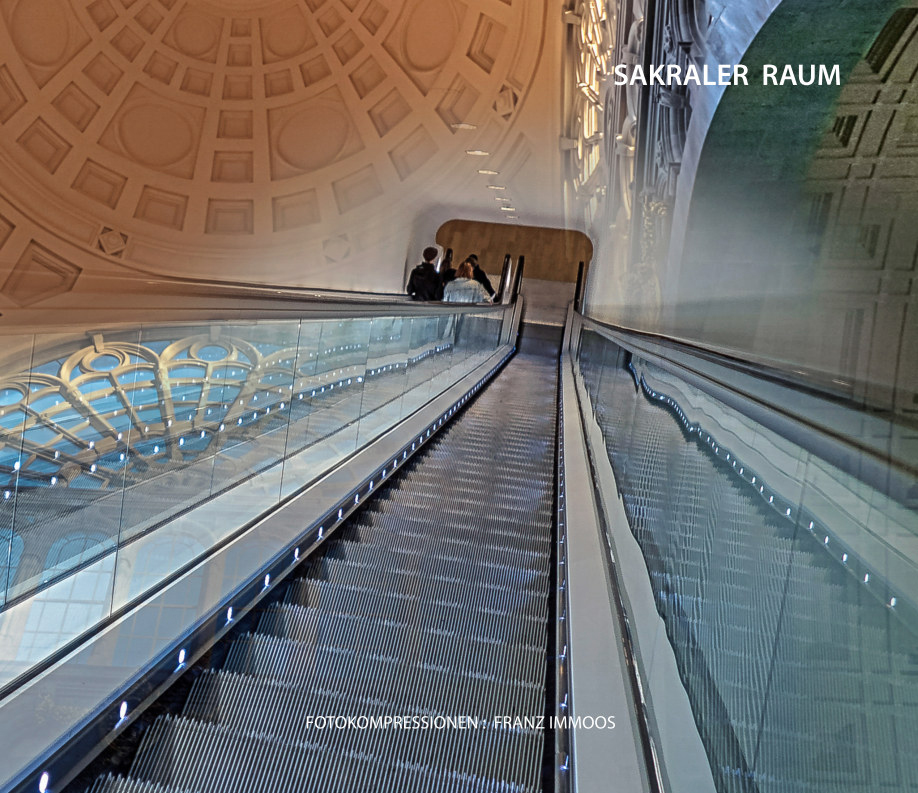
Sakraler Raum

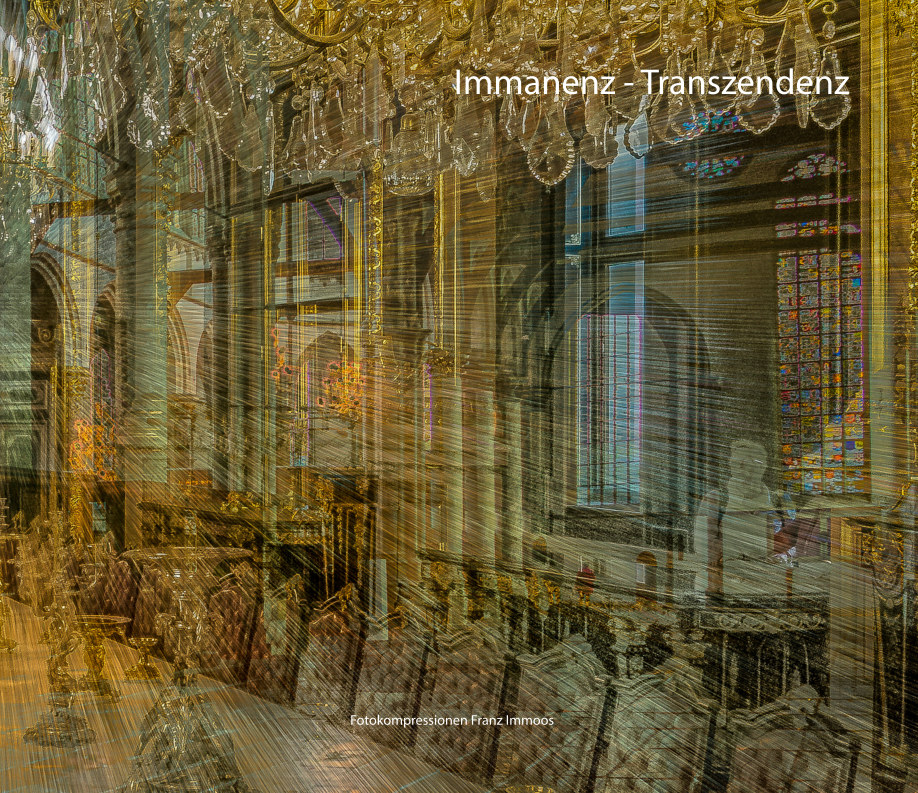
Immanenz Transzendenz

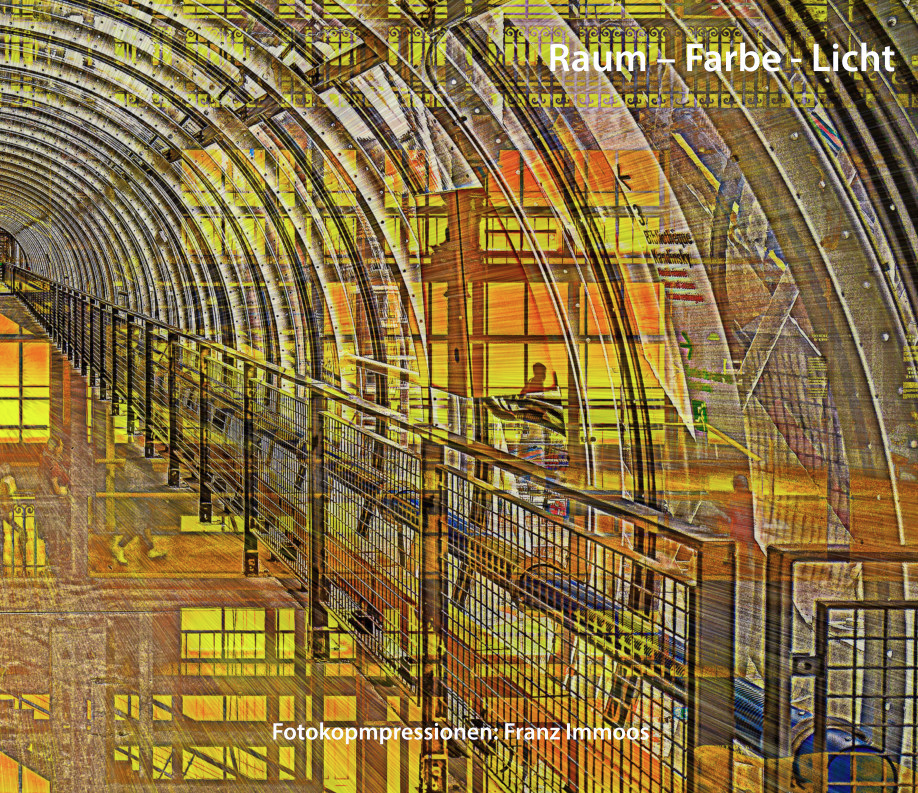
Raum Farbe Licht

The artist's books can be viewed online.

- 1982 "Imitations", Edition da Costa, Amsterdam, Netherlands
- 1984 "Water, Earth, Air", Edition da Costa, Amsterdam, Netherlands
- 1985 "Venus", Edition da Costa, Amsterdam, Netherlands
- 2018 "Pariser Foto-Skizzen". Fotokompressionen. ISBN 978-1-388-25494-0
- 2020 "Architekturcollagen". Fotokompressionen. ISBN 978-1-714-75038-2
- 2020 "Immanenz Transzendenz". Fotokompressionen. ISBN 978-1-714-74407-7
- 2021 "Light Images and Idols". Fotokompressionen. ISBN 978-1-006-99186-8
- 2021 "Sakraler Raum". Fotokompressionen. ISBN 978-1-006-99177-6
- 2022 "Raum-Farbe-Licht". Fotokompressionen.
- 2022 "Graffiti Idole". Fotokompressionen. ISBN 979-8-210-89499-1

== Residences and cultural centres ==
- 1991 Gallery Künstlerhaus Bremen, Bremen, Germany
- 1994 I.C.C.D. Trivandrum, Kerala, India
- 1995 Cultural centre Binz 39, Scuol-Nairs, Switzerland
- 1997 Sanskriti Kendra, Artist in Residence, New-Delhi, India
- 1999 Nairs – Centre for Contemporary Art, Scuol, Switzerland
- 2000 Kartause Ittingen, Warth-Weiningen, Switzerland
- 2000 Guest atelier Kaskadenkondensator, Basel, Switzerland
- 2001 Artists houses Worpswede, Worpswede, Germany
- 2002 Artists' Village Schöppingen, Schöppingen, Germany
- 2018 Cité Internationale des Arts, Paris, France
- 2018 Nairs – Centre for Contemporary Art, Scuol, Switzerland
- 2022 Cité Internationale des Arts, Paris, France

== Works in collections ==
- Öffentliche Kunstsammlung, Kunstmuseum Basel, Switzerland
- Nederlandsche Rijkscollectie: "kleine plastieken", "ijzer", "foto's in combinatie", "stempelkunst"
- Museum Fodor, Amsterdam, Netherlands
- Van Reekum Museum, Apeldoorn, Netherlands
- Gotthard Bank, Lugano, Switzerland
- Centrum Beeldende Kunst, Utrecht, Netherlands
- Landesbibliothek des Kantons Glarus, Glarus, Switzerland
- Ospidal – Center da sandà Engiadina Bassa, Scuol, Switzerland
- Collectie Nederland: Musea, Monumenten en Archeologie, Amersfoort, Netherlands
- "Helveticat": Online-Katalog der Schweizerischen Nationalbibliothek, Bern, Switzerland

== Grants ==
- 1974 Kiefer Hablitzelstipendium, Kunstmuseum Luzern, Switzerland
- 1976 Art grant of the city of Basel, Switzerland
- 1976 Cité Internationale des Arts, Paris, France
- 1978 Stipend of the city of Amsterdam, Netherlands
- 1979/81 Nederlandse Kunst Stipendia (CRM), The Hague, Netherlands
- 1997 Travel grant, Prins Bernhard Cultuurfonds, Amsterdam, Netherlands
- 2001 Artists houses Worpswede, Residence and scholarship, Worpswede, Germany
- 2002 Artists' Village Schöppingen, Residence and scholarship, Schöppingen, Germany
- 2003 /04/05 Fonds voor Beeldende Kunst, Amsterdam, Netherlands

== Prijzen ==
- 1976 Sponsorship award of the city of Basel, Basel, Switzerland
- 1978 Incentive Award of the Amsterdams Fonds voor de Kunst (AFK), Amsterdam, Netherlands
- 1979 Tender: Percentageregeling voor beeldende kunstopdrachten, MEAO Aula, Helmond, Netherlands
- 1979 Amsterdam koopt Kunst, Museum Fodor, Amsterdam, Netherlands
- 1980 Amsterdam koopt Kunst, Museum Fodor, Amsterdam, Netherlands
- 1999 Tender: Ospidal – Center da sandà Engiadina Bassa, Scuol, Switzerland

== Exhibitions ==
Immoos' works have been shown in more than 25 solo exhibitions and more than 50 group exhibitions.

=== Solo exhibitions ===
- 1976 Gallery Stampa, Basel, Switzerland
- 1978 /81/82/88 Gallery Lydia Megert Bern, Bern, Switzerland
- 1978 Other books and so, Amsterdam, Netherlands
- 1979 Hester van Royen Gallery, London, United Kingdom
- 1980 Gallery Nouvelles Images, The Hague, Netherlands
- 1982 /85/88/94 Gallery Resy Muijsers, Tilburg, Netherlands
- 1983 85/89 Multi Art Points, Amsterdam, Netherlands
- 1986 Gallery Ton Peek Photography, Amsterdam, Netherlands
- 1987 /94/01 Galerie Gruppe Grün, Bremen, West Germany/Germany
- 1989 Gallery Schöller, Düsseldorf, West Germany
- 1990 Stichting Beeldende Kunst, Amsterdam, Netherlands
- 1991 Centrum Beeldende Kunst, Utrecht, Netherlands
- 1991 Gallery Künstlerhaus Bremen, Bremen, Germany
- 1992 96 Gallery Maria Chailloux, Amsterdam, Netherlands
- 1993 Raum 1, Düsseldorf, Germany
- 1994 I.C.C.D. Trivandrum (Kerala), India
- 1994 Gallery Hubertus Wunschik, Düsseldorf, Germany
- 1995 Hortus Botanicus, Amsterdam, Netherlands
- 1996 Museum Waterland, Purmerend, Netherlands
- 1997 Sanskriti Kendra, Anandagram, Delhi, India
- 1998 Stichting Beeldende Kunst, Amsterdam, Netherlands
- 1999 Pennings Foundation, Eindhoven, Netherlands
- 2003 Gallery Frontstore, Basel, Switzerland
- 2005 Hortus Botanicus, Amsterdam, Netherlands

=== Group exhibitions ===
- 1981 5. Foto-Bienniale, "Erweiterte Fotografie", Vienna Secession, Vienna, Austria
- 1983 Kampnagel Fabrik, Hamburg, Germany
- 1983 Museum Waterland, Purmerend, Netherlands
- 1984 Städtische Galerie, Regensburg, Germany
- 1989 Arts Consultancy, Antwerpen, Belgium
- 1991 Gallery Künstlerhaus am Deich, Bremen, Germany
- 1993 Künstlerhaus Berlin, Haus am Lützowplatz (HAL), Berlin, Germany
- 1994 Gallery Schöller, Düsseldorf, Germany
- 1994 Große Kunstausstellung NRW, Kunstpalast Düsseldorf, Germany
- 1994 Westdeutscher Künstlerbund, Recklinghausen, Germany
- 1995 Gallery Cornelius Hertz, Bremen, Germany
- 1995 Fondazione Galleria Gottardo, Lugano, Switzerland
- 1995 Gallery Hubertus Wunschik, Düsseldorf, Germany
- 1995 Art Multiple, Kunstverlag Schuhmacher, Düsseldorf, Germany
- 1995 Art Kitchen Gallery with Steiger 8, Amsterdam, Netherlands
- 1996 De Annex, Amsterdam, Netherlands
- 1997 Privatgrün-Stadtgrün, Project, Bremen, Germany
- 1998 Stichting Beeldende Kunst, Amsterdam, Netherlands
- 1998 De Vishal, association for visual artists, Haarlem, Netherlands
- 1999 Het nieuwe Podium, Artoteek Zuidoost, Amsterdam, Netherlands
- 2000 Gallery Resy Muijsers Contemporary Art, "Nature matters", Tilburg, Netherlands
- 2000 Exhibition project "View assistance", Basel / Boswil, Switzerland
- 2001 Gallery Gruppe Grün, "Parallele-Universien", Bremen, Germany
- 2003 Gallery Resy Muijsers Contemporary Art, "25 Years Contemporary Art", Tilburg, Netherlands
- 2003 Edition Multipleart, Zürich and Galerie Zimmermannhaus, Brugg, Switzerland
- 2004 Edition Multipleart, Zürich and Galleria Ammann, Locarno, Switzerland
- 2004 Weserburg. Museum of Modern Art, "À la carte", Bremen, Germany
- 2005 Gallery Resy Muijsers Contemporary Art, Tilburg, Netherlands
- 2005 Artbox, Frankfurt am Main and Octagon Gallery, Amsterdam, Netherlands
- 2006 Edition Multipleart, Zürich and Kunsthaus Zofingen, Zofingen, Switzerland
- 2006 Gallery Maria Chailloux, "Convoi Exceptionne", Amsterdam, Netherlands
- 2007 Weserburg. Museum of Modern Art, "Leck mich!", artist stamps, Bremen, Germany
- 2008 Gallery Resy Muijsers Contemporary Art, Jubilee exhibition, Tilburg, Netherlands
- 2009 Gallery Maria Chailloux, "Minimentaal", Amsterdam, Netherlands
- 2010 Edition Multipleart, Zürich and Kunsthaus Zofingen, Zofingen, Switzerland
- 2010 Gallery Resy Muijsers Contemporary Art, "Staalkaart 33", Tilburg, Netherlands
- 2011 Kunstfrühling 2011, Gruppe Grün, Bremen, Germany
- 2012 Privatbesitz, Städtische Galerie Bremen, Bremen, Germany
- 2015 Treffpunkt Worpswede and Heinrich Vogeler Museum Barkenhoff, Worpswede, Germany

=== Art fairs ===
- 1982 /83/84 Art Basel: Gallery Lydia Megert Bern, Basel, Switzerland
- 1986 KunstRAI: Gallery Ton Peek Photography, Amsterdam, Netherlands
- 1993 Art Bologna: Gallery Lydia Megert Bern, Bologna, Italy
- 1997 KunstRAI: Steiger 8, Amsterdam, Netherlands
- 1997 KunstRAI: Gallery Resy Muijsers, Tilburg, Amsterdam, Netherlands
- 1998 Paris Photo: Gallery Pennings Eindhoven, Parijs, France
- 2000 /02/03/04/05 Art Frankfurt: Octagon Galerie, Amsterdam, Frankfurt, Germany
- 2004 /05 Art Cologne: Octagon Galerie, Amsterdam, Köln, Germany
- 2004 /05/06/07/08/09/10 Kunst Zürich: Edition Multipleart, Zürich, Switzerland

== Publications, catalogues and books ==
- 1976 Stampa 17, Gallery Stampa, brochure, Basel, Switzerland
- 1979 Metronom, "Mail-Art", Barcelona, Spain
- 1979 Universitätsbibliothek, "Buchobjekte", Freiburg im Breisgau, Germany
- 1979 Museum Fodor, "Amsterdam koopt kunst", Amsterdam, Netherlands
- 1979 Gallery Lydia Megert, "Artist-Books", Bern, Switzerland
- 1980 Metronom, "Artist-books", Barcelona, Spain
- 1980 Vienna Secession 5. Foto-Bienniale, "Erweiterte Fotografie", catalogue, Vienna, Austria
- 1980 Vleeshal, "Installaties", Middelburg in cooperation with gallery Lydia Megert Bern, Netherlands
- 1981 Galerie Gruppe Grün, "Zwischenbereiche". International Summer programme, Bremen, Germany
- 1982 Kulturverwaltung, "Kunst zum Überleben", Bergkamen, Germany
- 1982 Galerie im Ganserhaus, "Mail-Art 83", Wasserburg, Germany
- 1982 Nederlandse Kunststichting, "Foto's in combinatie", Amsterdam, Netherlands
- 1982 Edition da Costa, "Imitations", Kunstenaarsboek, Amsterdam, Netherlands
- 1983 Edition Hohweg, "Umgang mit der Aura", catalogue, Zürich, Switzerland
- 1983 Kulturbehörde Hamburg, Kampnagelfabrik "Triptychons", Hamburg, Germany
- 1983 Galerie Vor-Ort, "Chronik", Hamburg, Germany
- 1984 Edition da Costa, "Water, Earth, Air", 3 art books, Amsterdam, Netherlands
- 1985 Edition da Costa, "Venus", Amsterdam, Netherlands
- 1983 Galerie Resy Muijsers, "100 Kunstenaars", Tilburg, Netherlands
- 1986 Galerie Gruppe Grün, "Franz Immoos-Objekte", Bremen, Germany
- 1987 Der Alltag nr.1/87. "Aktuelle Fotografie in der Schweiz", Switzerland
- 1989 Stichting Fonds Beeldende Kunsten, Vormgeving en Bouwkunst (Fonds BKVB), Amsterdam, Netherlands
- 1989 Helmhaus, "Künstlerbücher in der Schweiz", Zürich, Switzerland
- 1990 Stadt Amsterdam, "Afdeling Kunstzaken. Jaarverslag", Amsterdam, Netherlands
- 1991 Centrum Beeldende Kunst, "Pigmentfrottages" 3/91, Utrecht, Netherlands
- 1992 Galerie Gruppe Grün, "20 Jahre Galerie Gruppe Grün", Bremen, Germany
- 1992 Künstlerhaus Bremen, "Mai 1991-Oktober 1992", Bremen, Germany
- 1993 Catalogue Stipendiaten Binz 39 Scuol-Nairs 1991–1992, Stiftung Binz 39, Zürich, Switzerland
- 1993 Stadt Amsterdam, "Kleinschalige Kunstopdrachten 1991/1992", Amsterdam, Netherlands
- 1993 Künstlerhaus Berlin, "Kunst auf Zeit", Edition 3. ISBN 3-89479-036-9, Berlin, Germany
- 1994 Verein Kunstausstellungen Düsseldorf, "Grosse Kunstausstellung Düsseldorf", ISSN 0931-0908, Düsseldorf, Germany
- 1994 Westdeutscher Künstlerbund, Kunsthalle "Wir hier", Recklinghausen. ISBN 3-929040-18-2, Germany
- 1994 Galerie Schöller, "Jubiläumsausstellung", Düsseldorf, Germany
- 1995 Collection "Schweizer-Fotografie". Die Sammlung der Gotthard Bank, Lugano, Zürich, ISBN 88-86455-04-6, Switzerland
- 1996 Amsterdams Fonds voor de Kunst, "Beeldende Kunstopdrachten", Amsterdam, Netherlands
- 1997 Senator für Bildung, Kunst und Wissenschaft, "Privat-Stadtgrün", Bremen, Germany
- 1999 Pennings Foundation, "Dream". Photo portfolio, Eindhoven, Netherlands
- 1998 Vishal, "Zien is geloven. Hedendaagse kunst in Nederland", Haarlem, Netherlands
- 1996 Nairs – Centre for Contemporary Art, "Energetik der Farbe", Scuol, Switzerland
- 2000 "Das magische Quadrat Arbeits Brochüre", 21x21cm, Amsterdam, Netherlands
- 2000 "Die Psychoenergetische Farbwahrnehmung", A 4 / 70S, Amsterdam, Netherlands
- 2001 "Schweizer Stimmen Kunstschaffen in den Niederlanden", Botschaft, Den Haag. ISBN 90-90-14400-5, Netherlands
- 2002 30 Jahre Gruppe Grün, Galerie Gruppe Grün, Bremen. ISBN 3-88808-283-8, Germany
- 2003 Book "Farbe, Eigenschaft und Wirkung", 101 p., Schöppingen, Germany
- 2004 "Art à la carte", Weserburg. Museum of Modern Art, Bremen. ISBN 3-928761-63-3, Germany
- 2004 Blue Print: Das Magazin Int. University, Bremen Nr.6, Bremen. ISSN 1619-1536, Germany
- 2007 Edition Multiple Art, Benteli Verlag, Bern. ISBN 978-3-7165-1521-1, Switzerland
- 2009 "Energetik der Farbe", Franz Immoos (Website)
- 2011 Catalogue "Kunstfrühling 2011", Bremen. ISBN 978-3-88808-710-3, Germany
- 2012 Book "Farbe", Franz Immoos
- 2012 Book "Pin up shoot", Franz Immoos (Limited Edition)
- 2014 Book "Portraits of Animals, Natura Artis Magistra", Franz Immoos
- 2015 Treffpunkt Worpswede and Heinrich Vogeler Museum Barkenhoff, Worpswede. ISBN 978-3-89946-237-1
- 2017 Book "Compilation – Art Photography", Franz Immoos
- 2018 Book "Pariser Foto-Skizzen". Fotokompressionen, Franz Immoos. ISBN 978-1-388-25494-0
- 2020 Book "Architekturcollagen". Fotokompressionen, Franz Immoos. ISBN 978-1-714-75038-2
- 2020 Book "Immanenz Transzendenz". Fotokompressionen, Franz Immoos. ISBN 978-1-714-74407-7
- 2021 Book "Light Images and Idols". Fotokompressionen, Franz Immoos. ISBN 978-1-006-99186-8
- 2021 Book "Sakraler Raum". Fotokompressionen, Franz Immoos. ISBN 978-1-006-99177-6
- 2022 Book "Raum-Farbe-Licht". Fotokompressionen, Franz Immoos.
- 2023 Book "Graffiti Idole". Fotokompressionen. ISBN 979-8-210-89499-1
