= Museum Fodor =

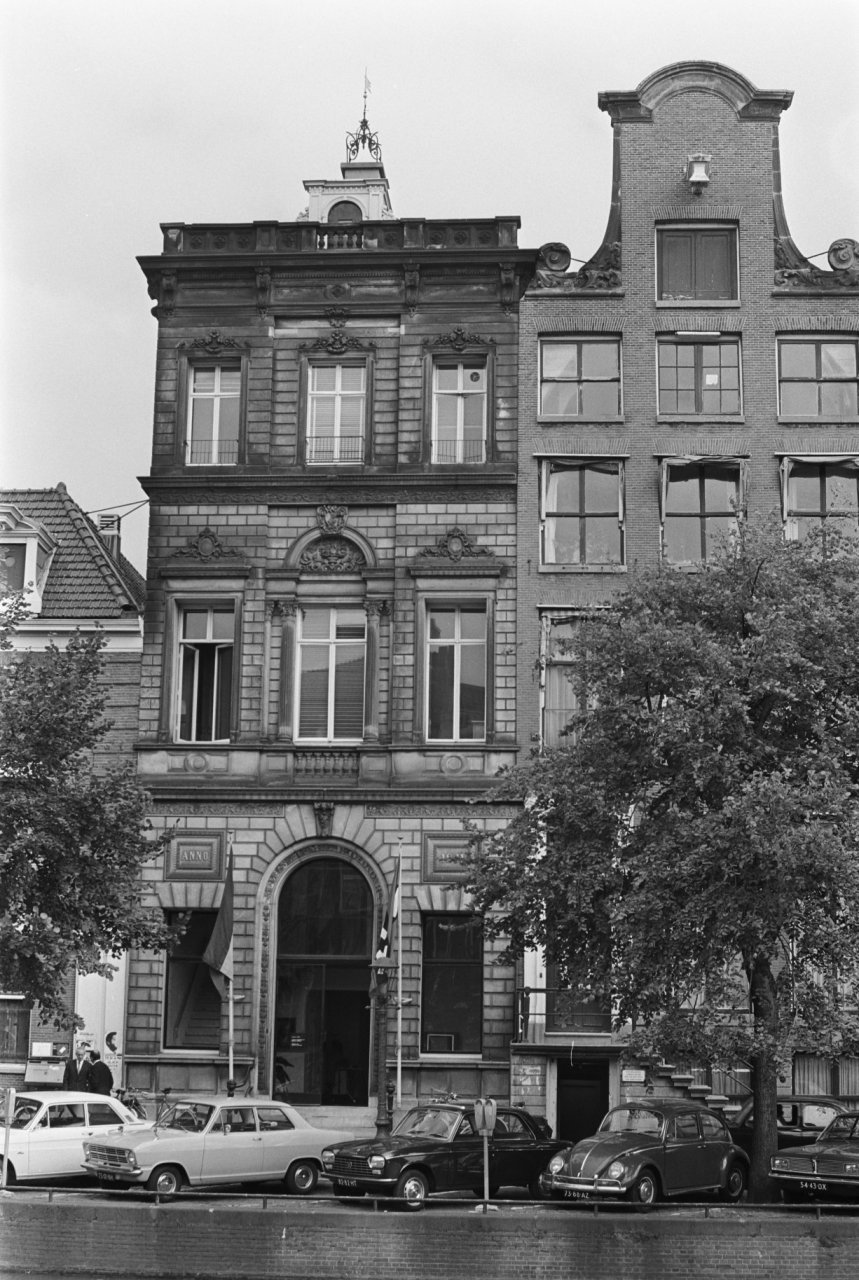
- Museum Fodor in 1970

- Location in the city center of Amsterdam
- Established: 1863
- Dissolved: 1 January 1993
- Location: Keizersgracht 609; Amsterdam, Netherlands
- Coordinates: 52°21′50″N 4°53′37″E
- Type: Art museum
- Founder: Carel Joseph Fodor

Museum Fodor (Dutch pronunciation: [myˈzeːjʏɱ ˈfoːdɔr]) is a former art museum in Amsterdam in the Netherlands. The museum was located at the Keizersgracht in Amsterdam-Centrum in the building that currently houses the Foam Fotografiemuseum Amsterdam.

The museum was opened in 1863. It was founded following the death of Carel Joseph Fodor and displayed his art collection. The museum was dissolved in 1993. Fodor's collection is now managed by the Amsterdam Museum.

== History ==
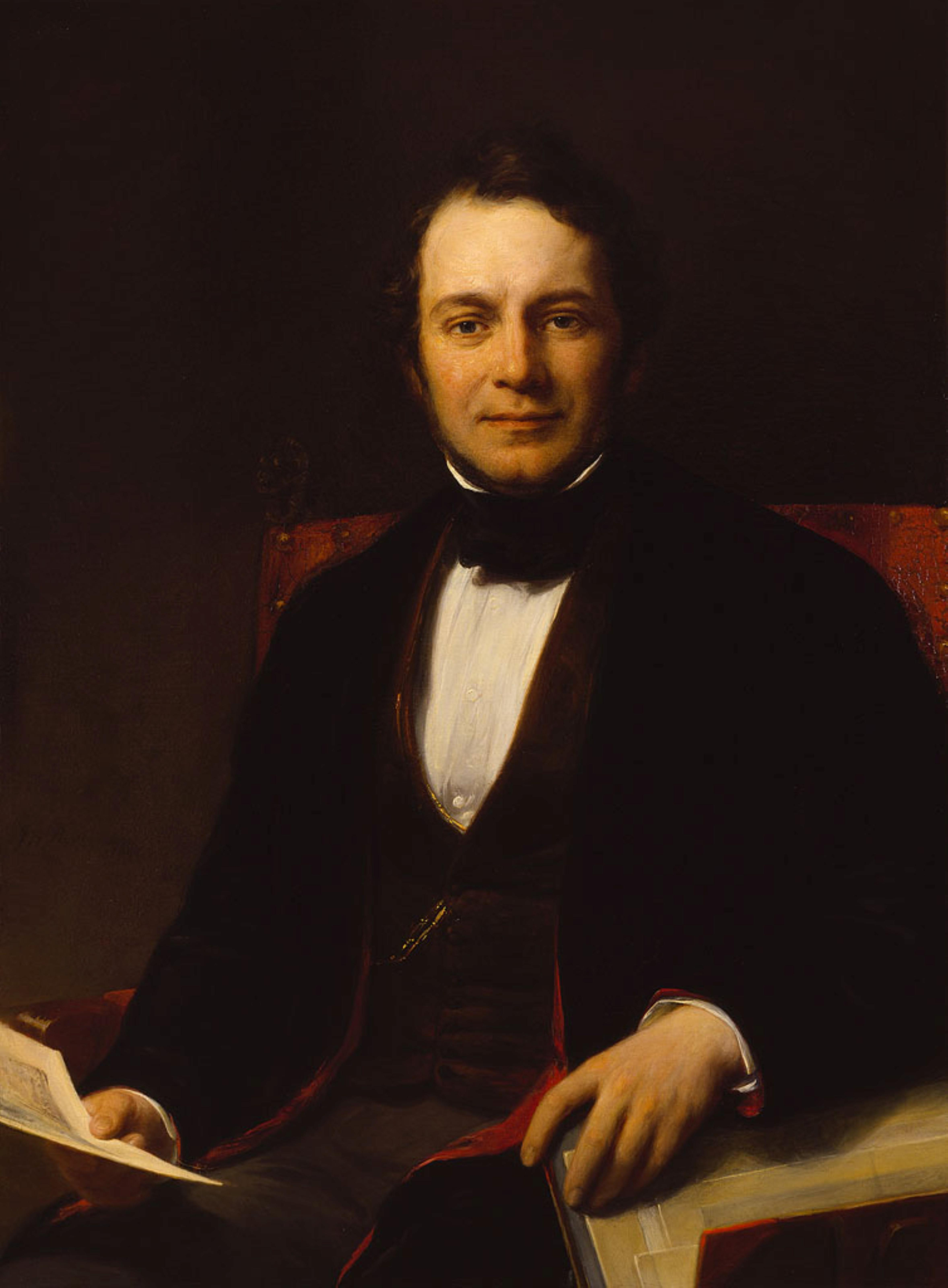
Portrait of Carel Joseph Fodor (1848) by Jan Willem Pieneman

The monumental building on the Keizersgracht canal has a history going back to Carel Joseph Fodor (1801–1860), who worked in the coal trading business. Carel Fodor first bought the Keizersgracht 611. Later he also bought the adjacent warehouse and residential house.

Fodor started to collect paintings, drawings and prints from 1834 onwards. His preference went out to contemporary art, works by 'living masters'. Fodor quickly opened up his house to the general public, where many art lovers visited to see his collection by appointment.

When Fodor died, he bequeathed his collection to the city of Amsterdam. He also left behind a large sum of money to turn his house into a museum. Fodor destined Keizersgracht 609, the warehouse, in his testament as the exhibition space that should receive the name Museum Fodor. It should become a permanent exhibition space for his personal collection.

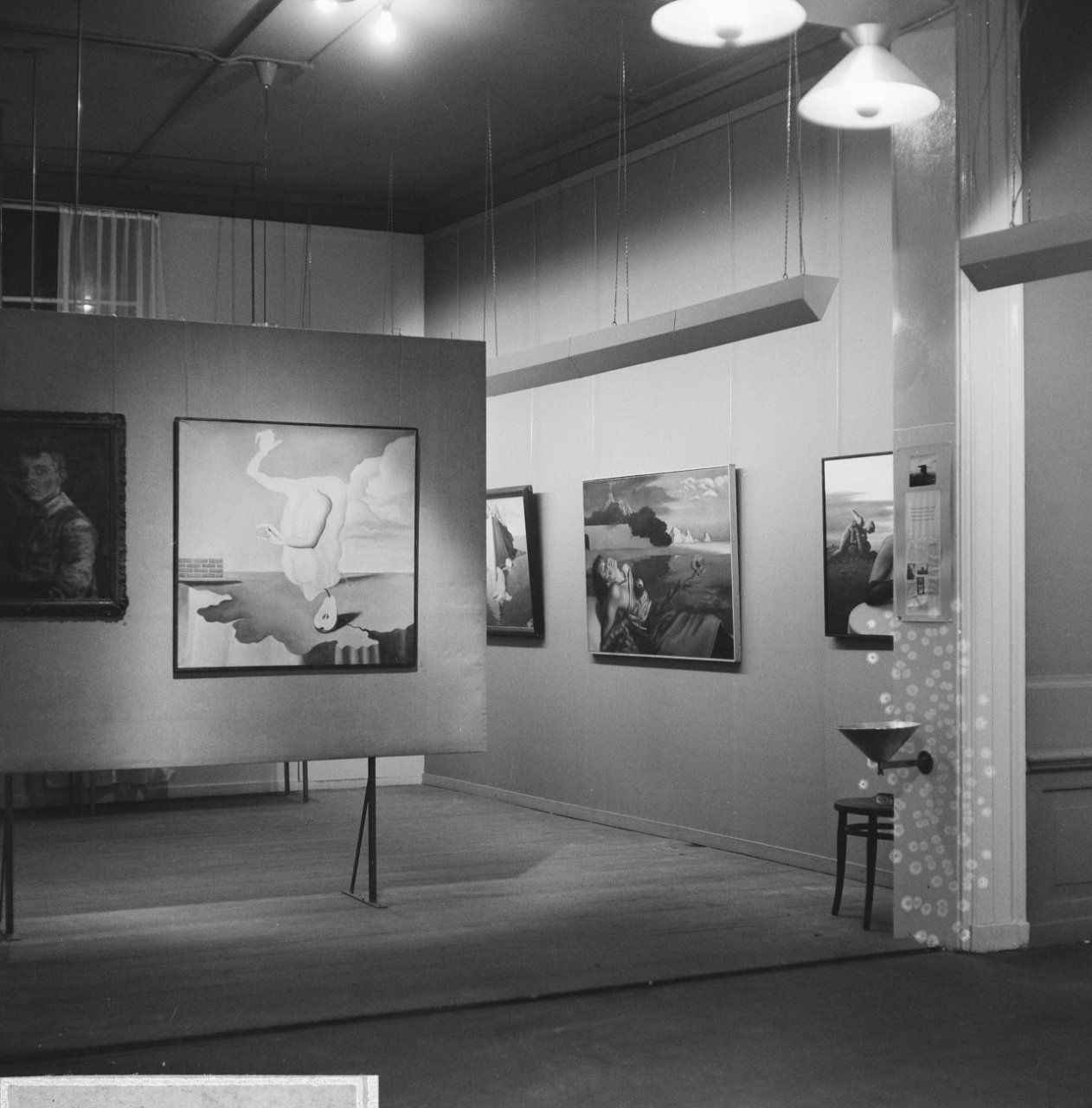
Painting exhibition in 1966

The building was renovated in 1861 by Cornelis Outshoorn. In 1863, Museum Fodor opened its doors as the first museum of modern art. In the early years the museum attracted a large number of visitors, but as the years passed by these numbers dwindled.

In 1948 the collection was stored in a depot and the museum became a separate location of the Stedelijk Museum. In 1963 the complete collection was taken over by the Amsterdams Historisch Museum.

Museum Fodor was dissolved on 1 January 1993.

== Building ==
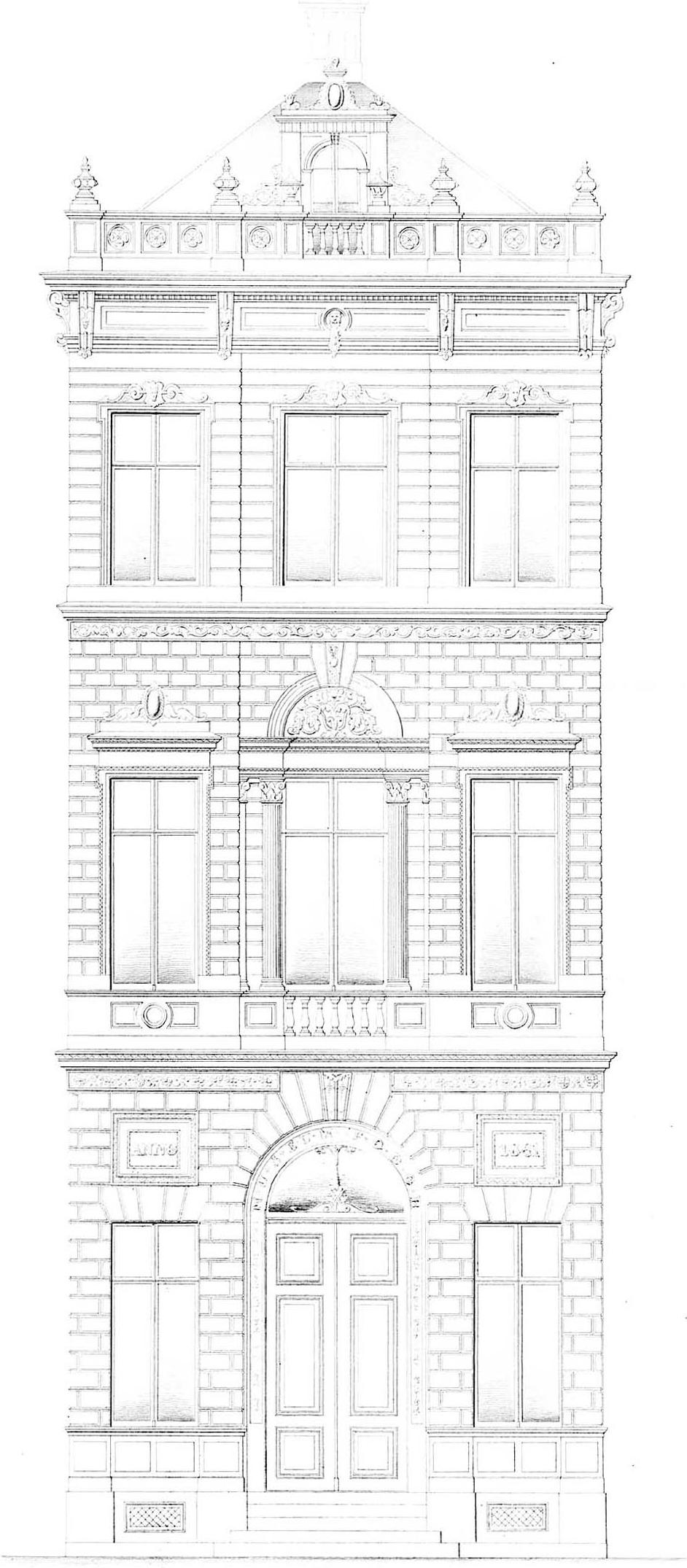
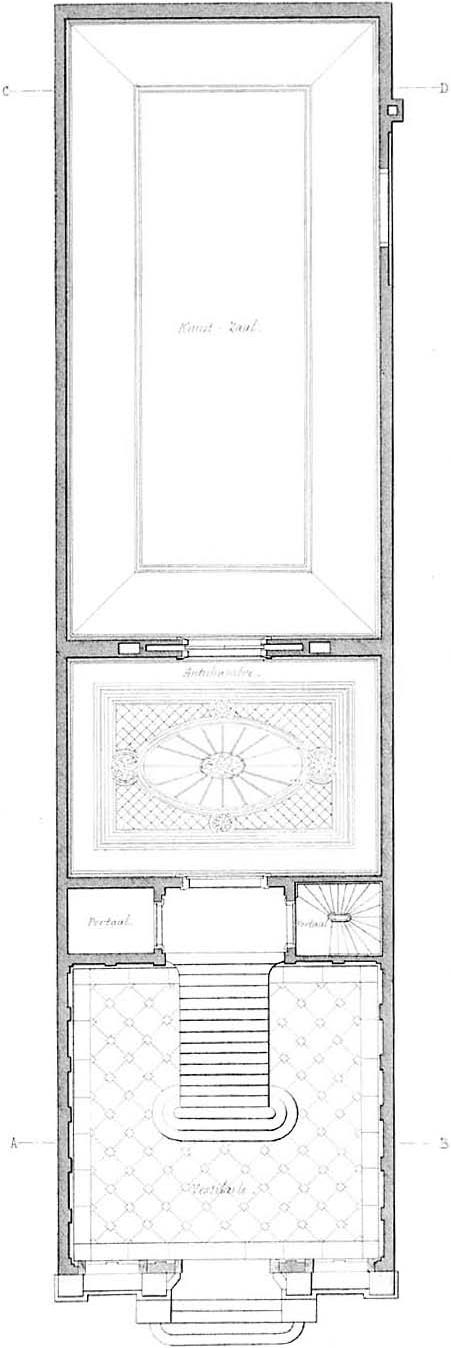
The facade and floor plan of the museum designed by Cornelis Outshoorn

Museum Fodor was located at Keizersgracht 609 near the Leidsestraat in the center of the canal district in the borough Amsterdam-Centrum.

The museum building was originally a canal-side warehouse. In 1860, it was owned by Carel Joseph Fodor. In 1861–62, after Fodor's death, the building was turned into a museum by a design of architect Cornelis Outshoorn. The building was elevated with an Italianate facade, made of sandstone, with a straight cornice.

The building has been a rijksmonument (national heritage site) since 1970.

From 1994 to 2001, the Dutch Design Institute was housed in the building. Since 2001, the Foam Fotografiemuseum Amsterdam is located here.

== Collection ==
The collection of Museum Fodor consisted of the large collection of paintings, prints, and drawings that Carel Joseph Fodor bequeathed to the city of Amsterdam. Among the paintings was Christus Consolator (1837) by Ary Scheffer, which Fodor had bought from the collection of the Duchess of Orléans. The museum acquired the Atlas Splitgerber in 1879 and a collection of works by Jan and Caspar Luyken in 1889.

From 1948, the collection was no longer on display in Museum Fodor. The paintings were moved to the Stedelijk Museum Amsterdam, the prints and drawings to the Rijksmuseum and the Atlas Splitgerber to the Amsterdam City Archives. Since 1963, Fodor's collection is managed by the Amsterdams Historisch Museum.

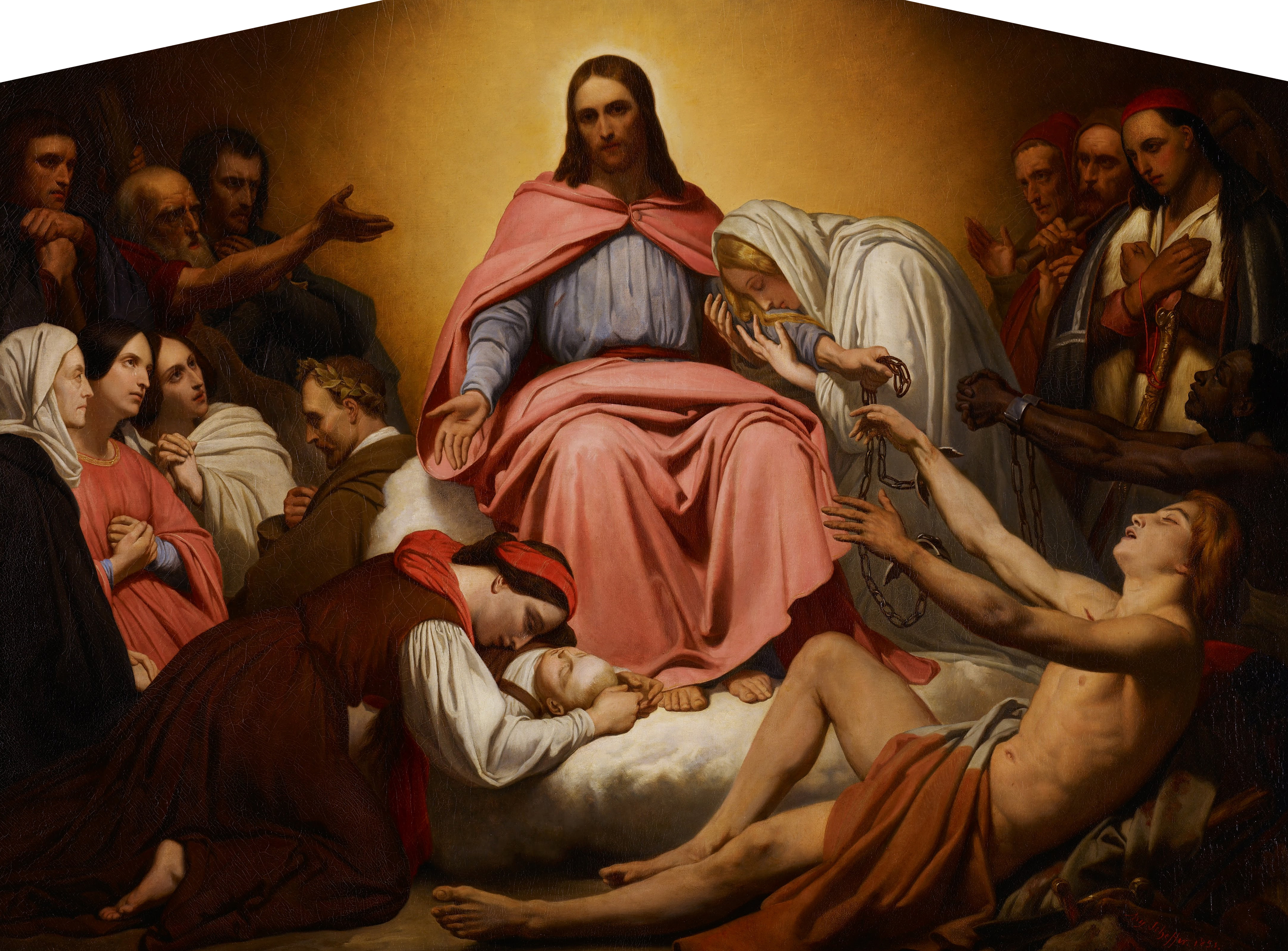
Christus Consolator (1837) by Ary Scheffer

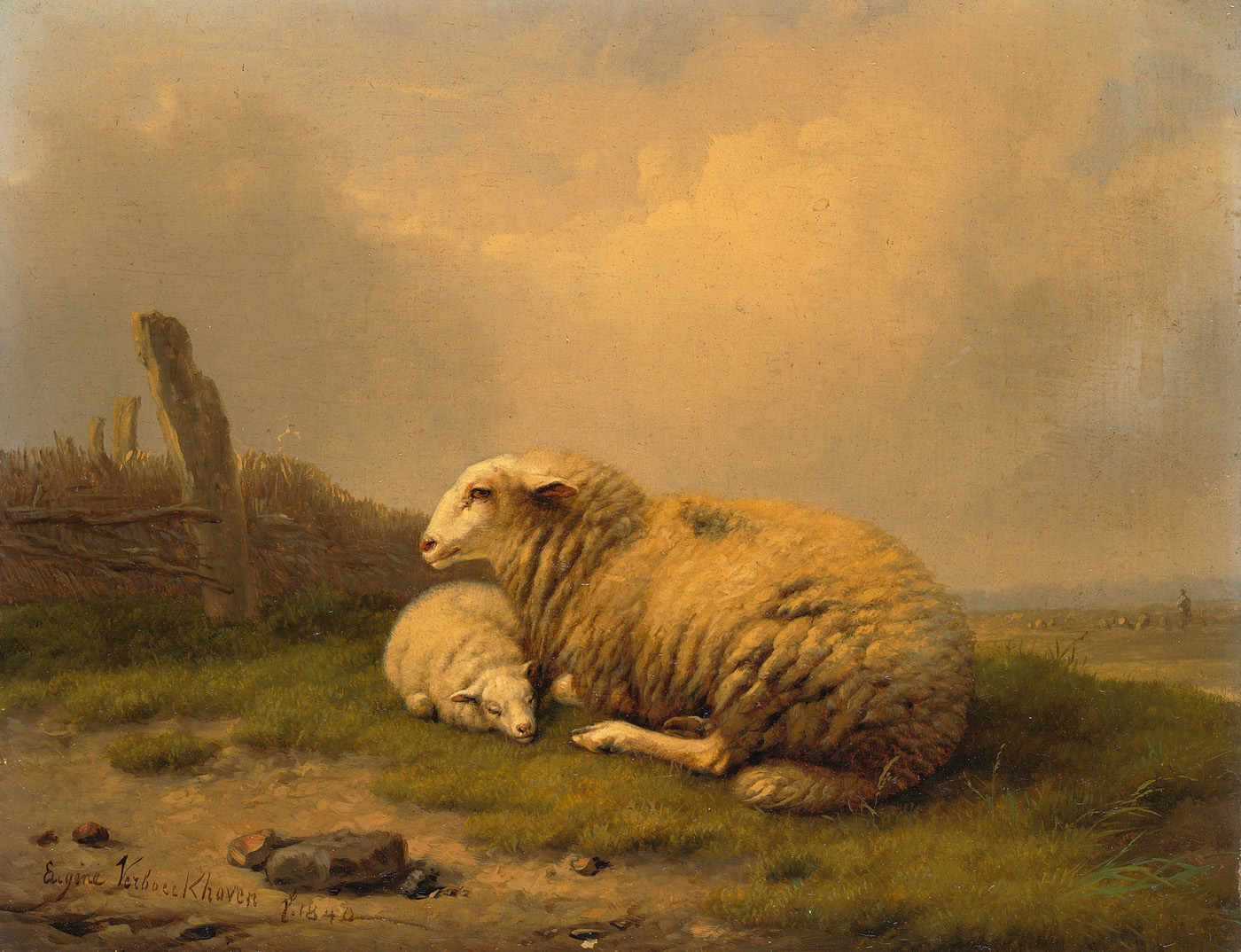
Resting sheep with lamb (1840) by Eugène Joseph Verboeckhoven

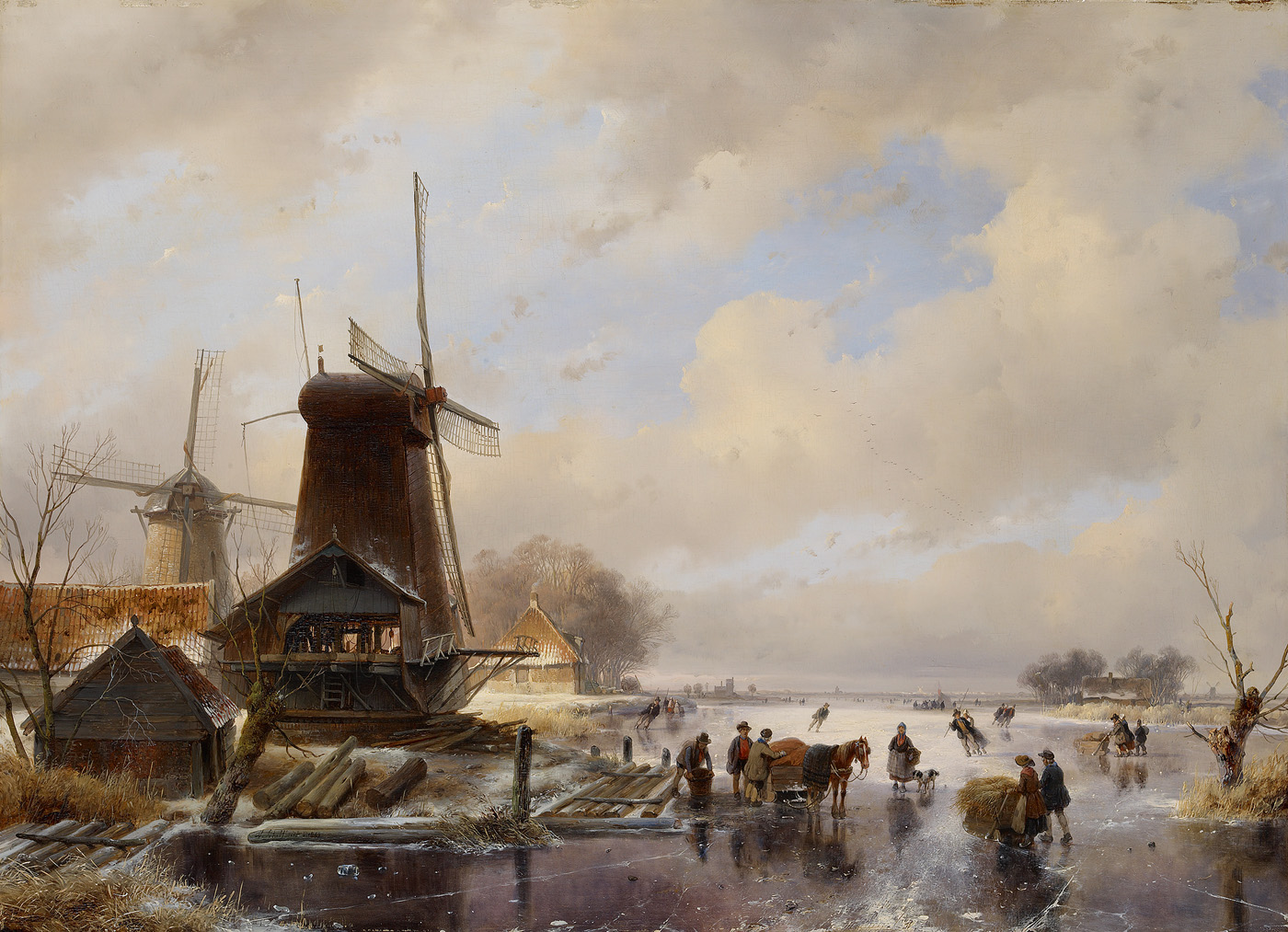
Sawmill at a frozen canal (1842) by Andreas Schelfhout

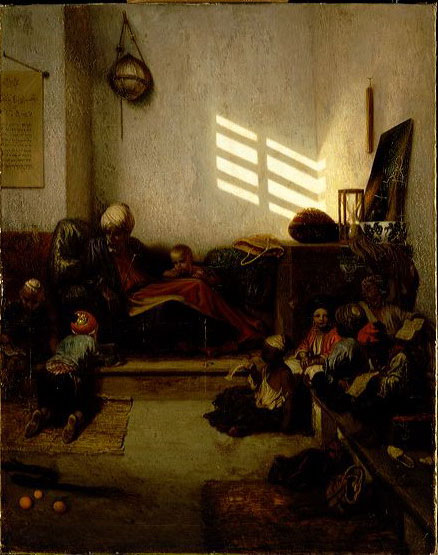
Turkish school (1846) by Alexandre-Gabriel Decamps

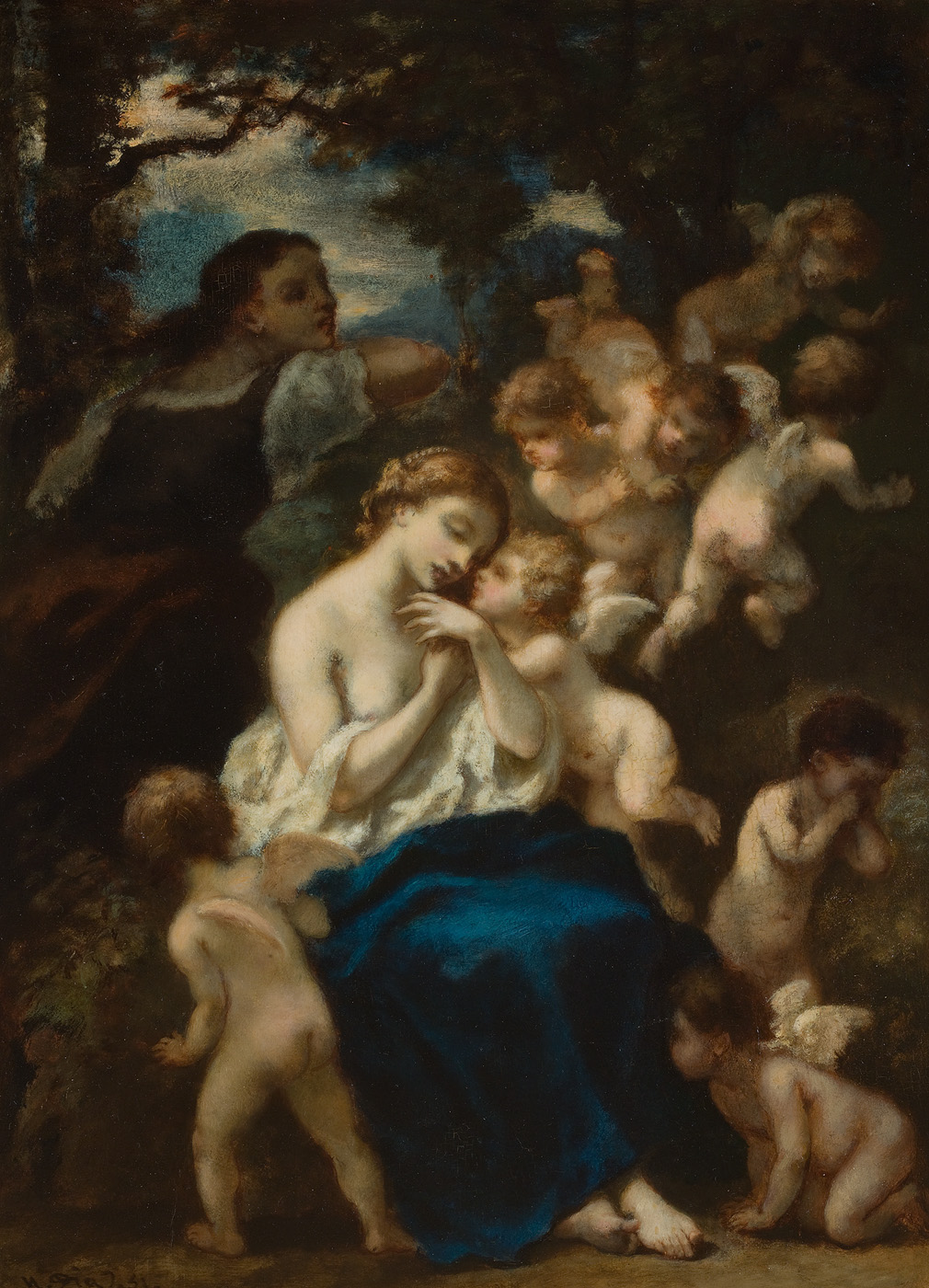
Nymph with cupidos (1851) by Narcisse Virgilio Díaz

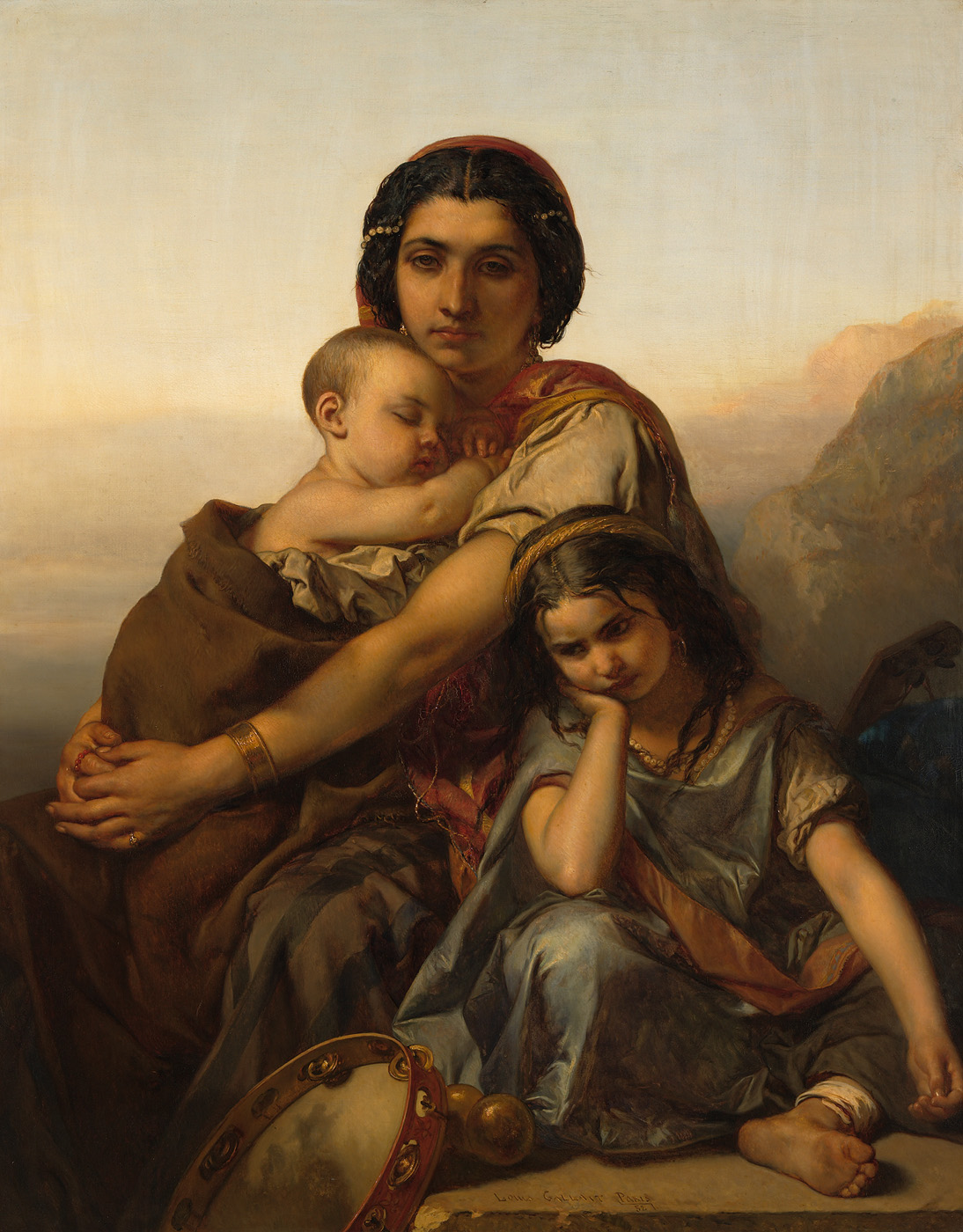
Gypsy woman with two children (1852) by Louis Gallait

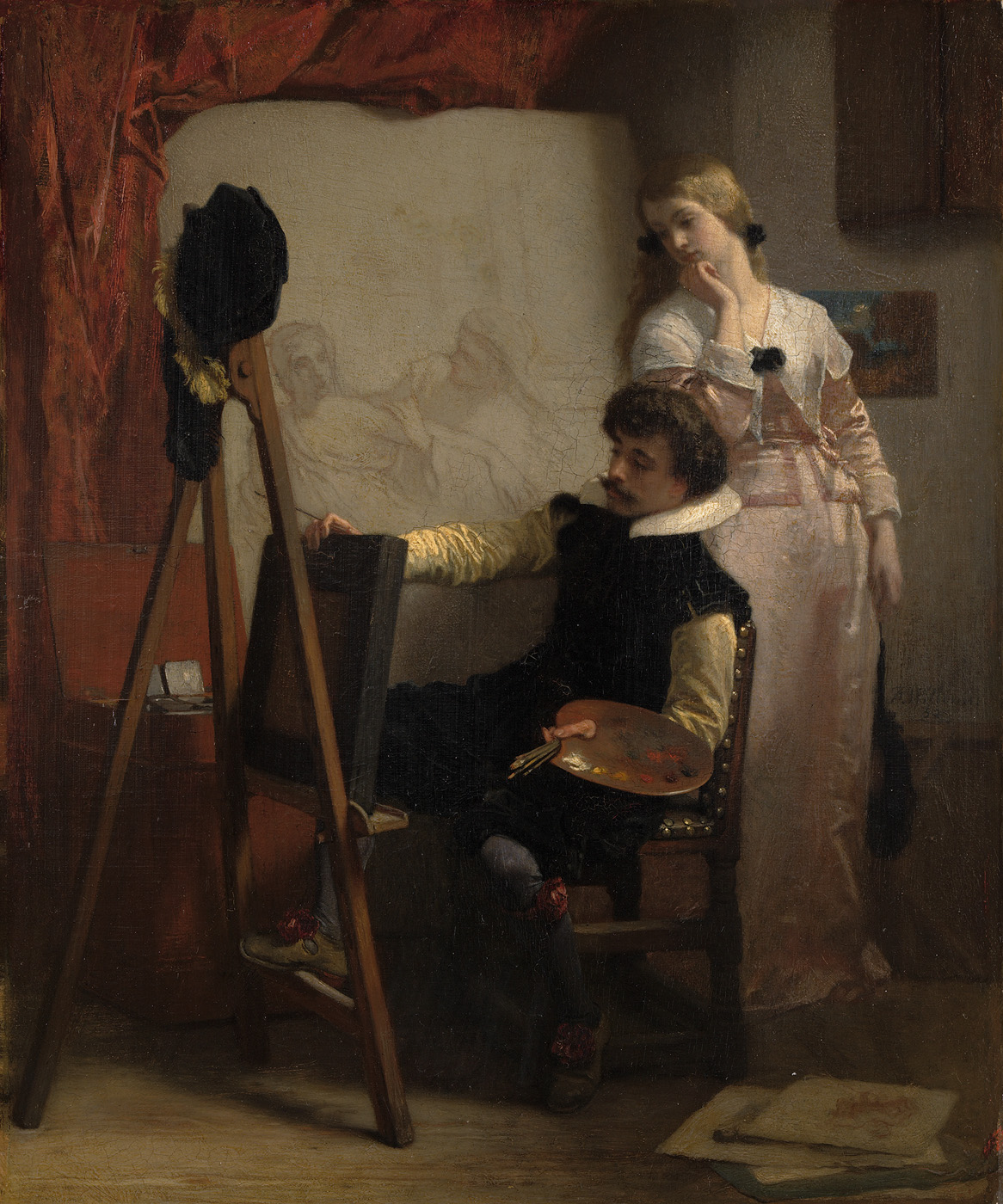
Painter behind his easel shows a painting to a girl (1852) by Florent Joseph Marie Willems

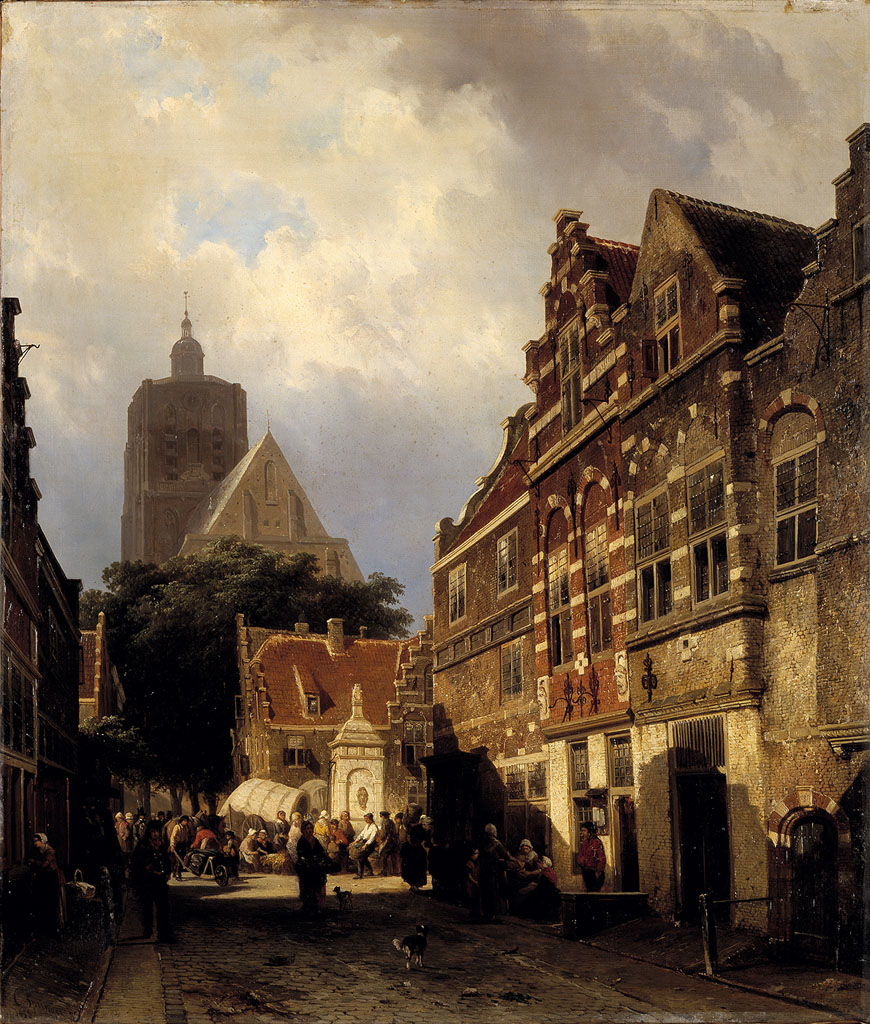
View on the Wellerondom in Den Briel (1856) by Cornelis Springer

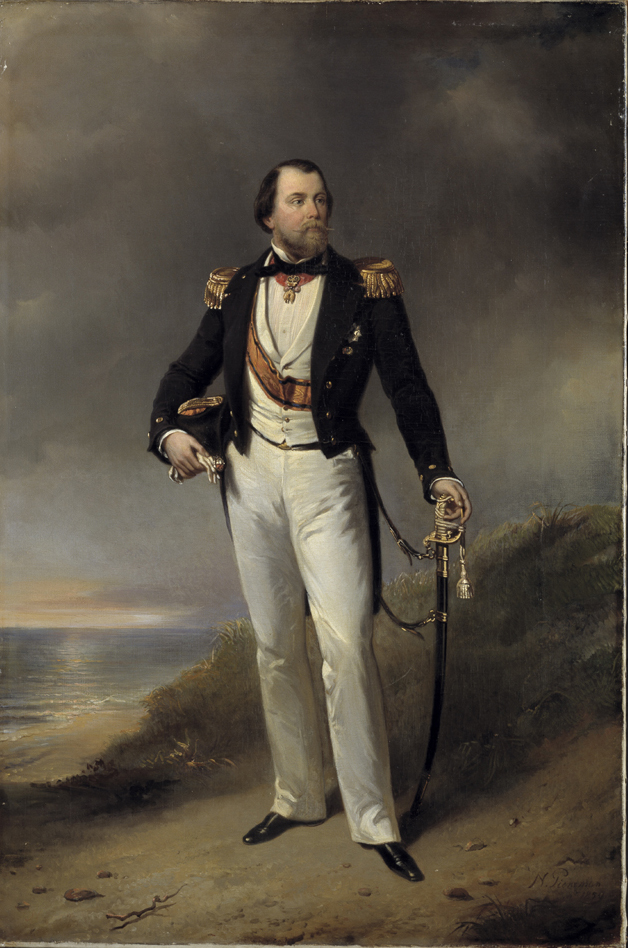
Portrait of William III (1859) by Nicolaas Pieneman

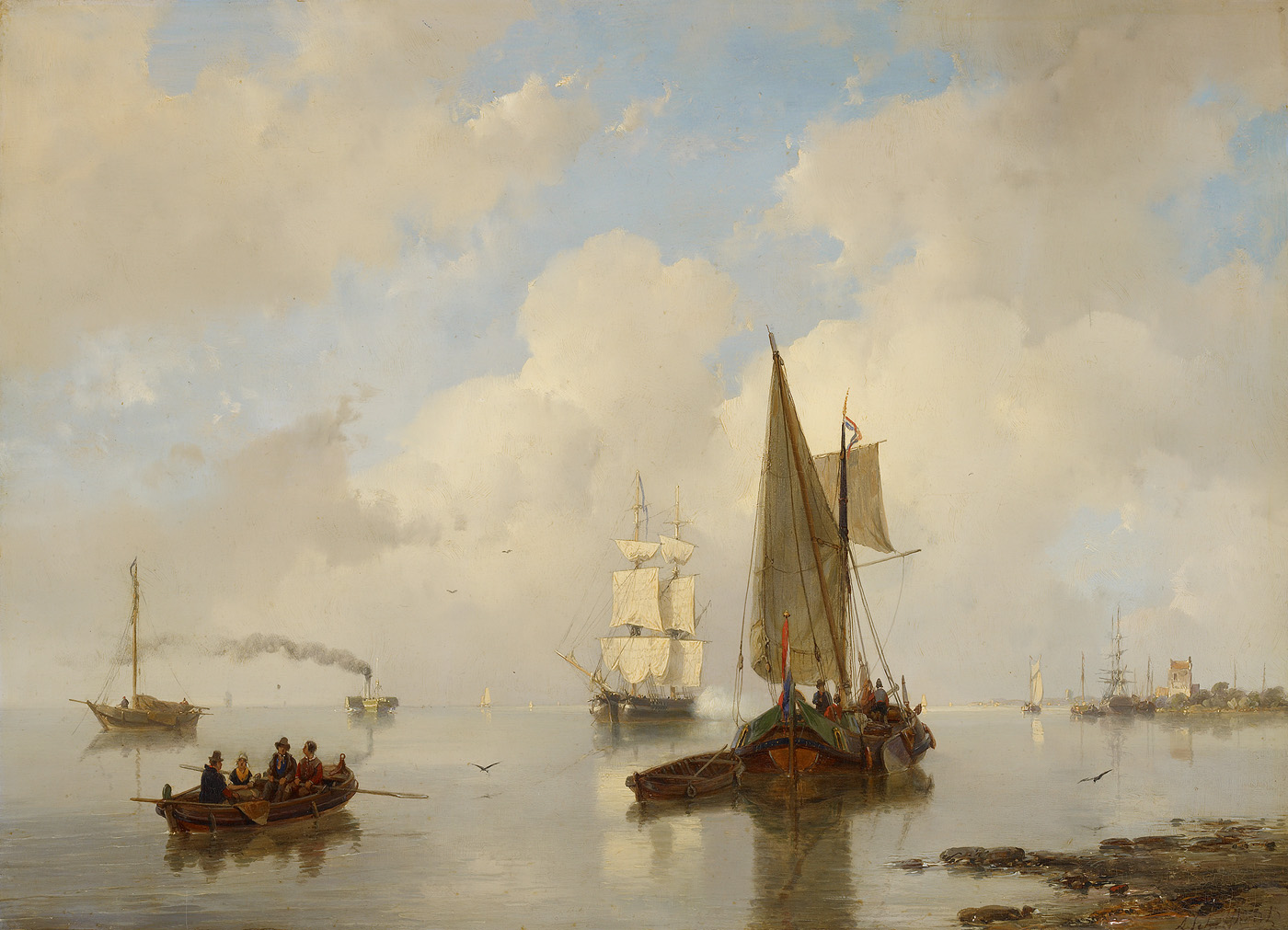
Zeelandic waters in quiet weather (1860) by Andreas Schelfhout
