= Union of Lublin (painting) =

Painting by Jan Matejko

- Unia Lubelska (Polish)
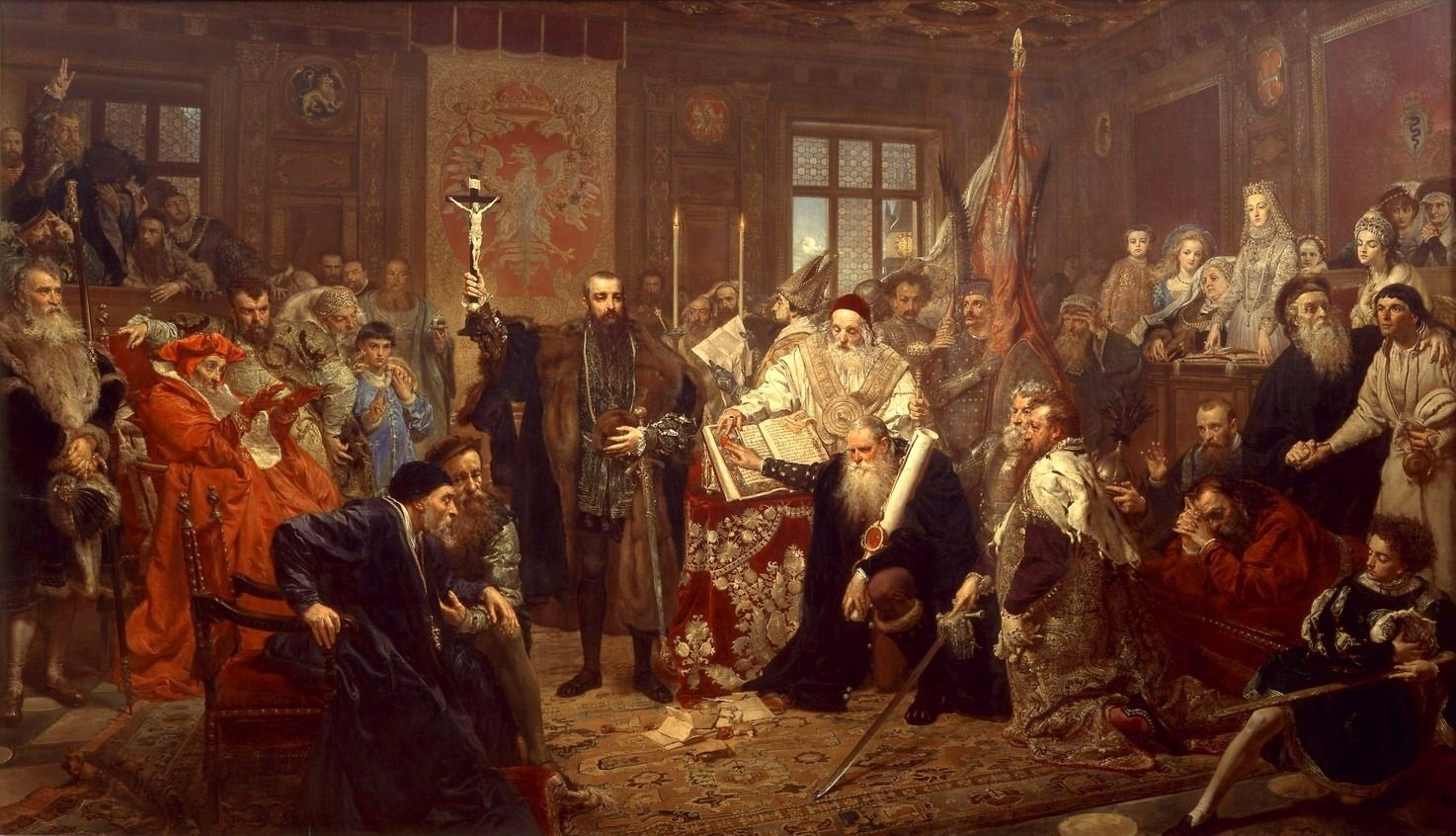
- Artist: Jan Matejko
- Year: 1869
- Medium: oil on canvas
- Dimensions: 298 cm × 512 cm (117 in × 202 in)
- Location: National Museum of Lublin

Union of Lublin (Polish: Unia lubelska) is an oil painting by the Polish artist Jan Matejko, finished in 1869, depicting the Union of Lublin. The work is owned by the National Museum in Warsaw and is displayed at the National Museum in Lublin.
