= Chapel of the Holy Trinity, Lublin Castle =

Coordinates: 51°15′01.1″N 22°34′23.2″E

Chapel of the Holy Trinity
- Kaplica Trójcy Świętej
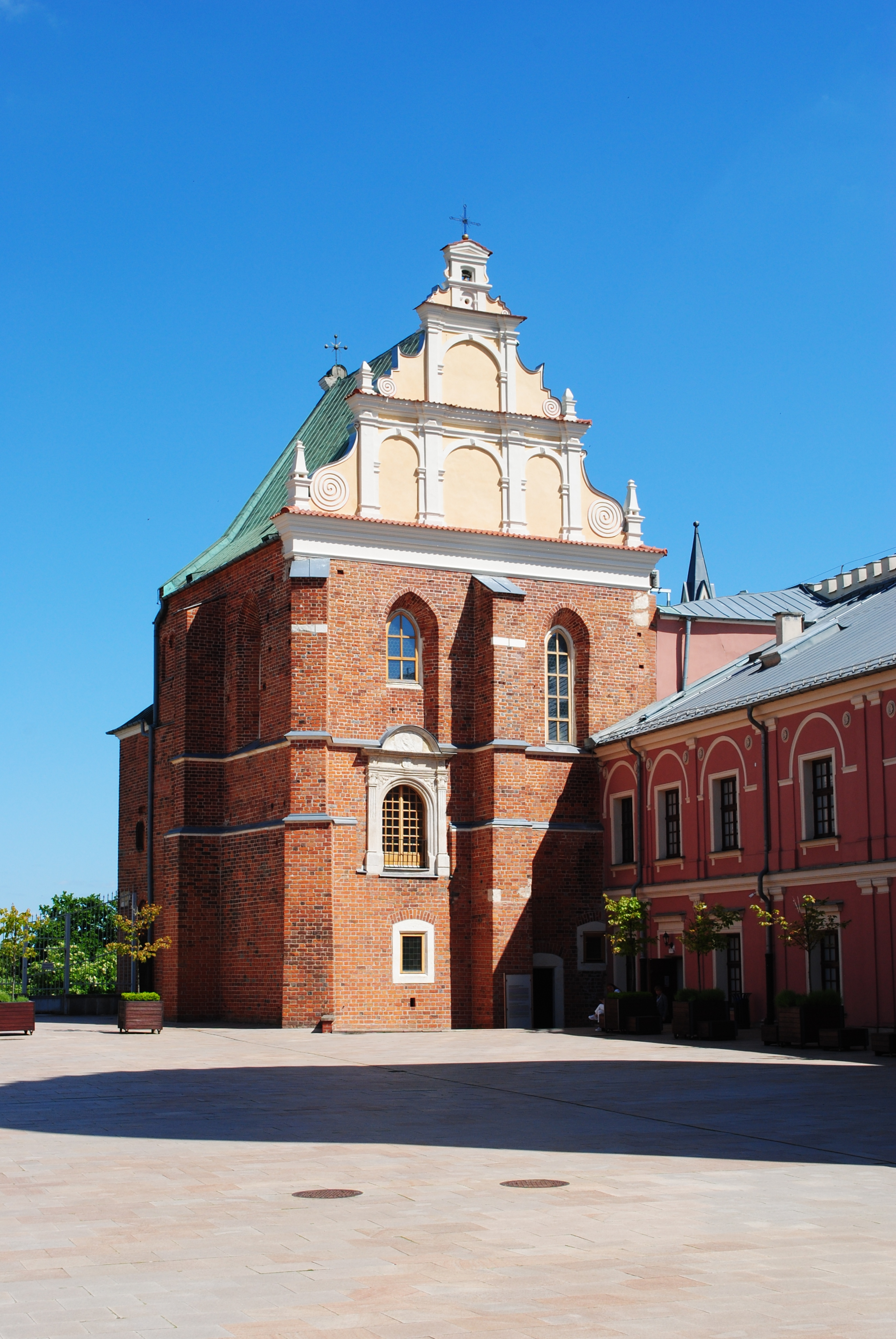
- Interactive map of the Chapel of the Holy Trinity area

General information
- Architectural style: Brick Gothic, Polish Renaissance
- Location: Lublin Castle, Lublin, Poland
- Renovated: 1407

Historic Monument of Poland
- Designated: 2007-04-25
- Part of: Lublin – historic architectural and urban ensemble
- Reference no.: Dz. U. z 2007 r. Nr 86, poz. 574

The Chapel of the Holy Trinity (Polish: Kaplica Trójcy Świętej), also known as Lublin Castle Chapel (Kaplica Zamkowa), is a Gothic chapel with a Renaissance gable located within the courtyard of Lublin Castle in Lublin, Poland. The chapel adjoins the museum of the castle complex and is an integral part of the site. It is known for its fifteenth-century frescoes in the Byzantine or Orthodox style, unusual for Catholic Poland.

== History ==
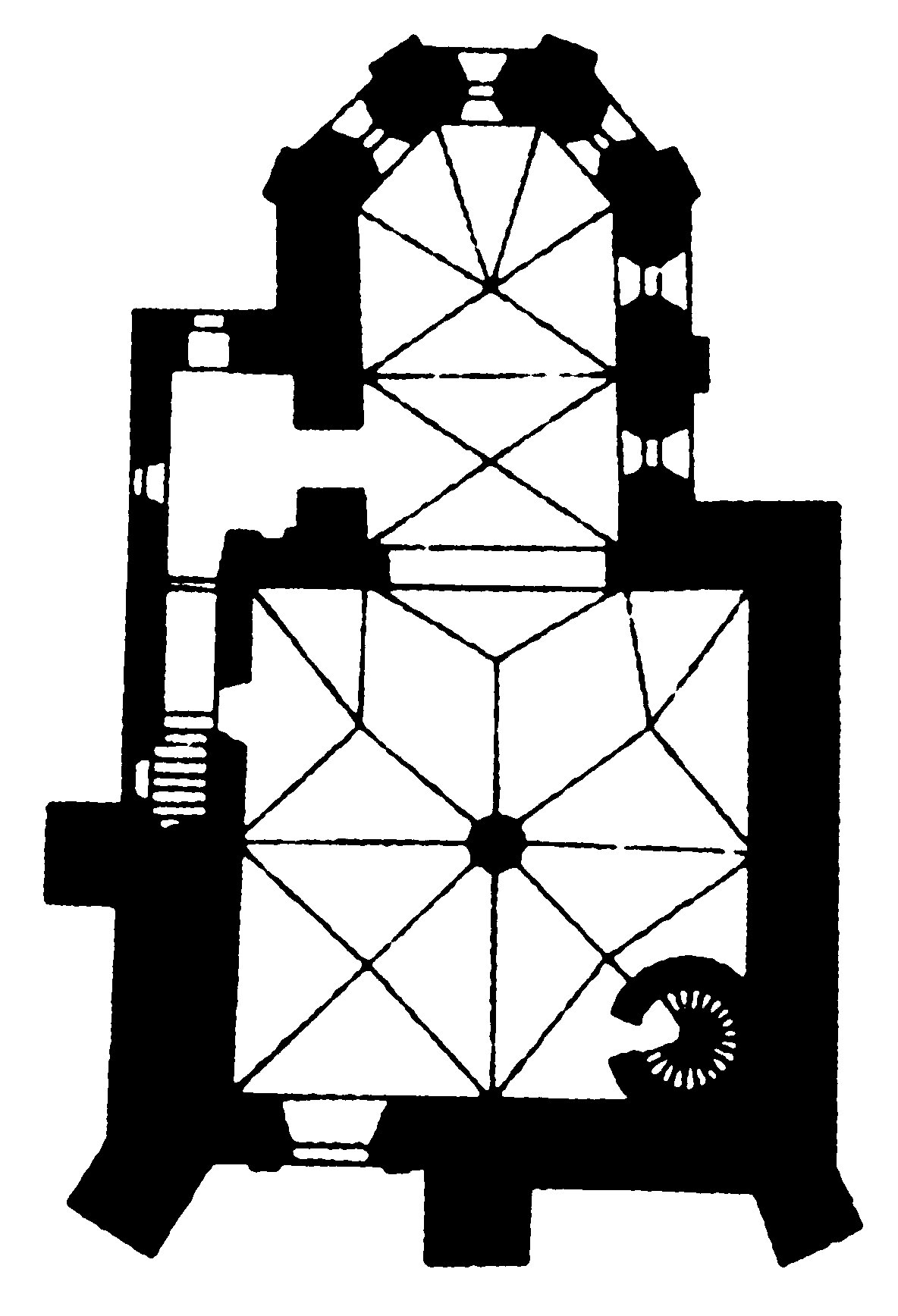
Plan of the chapel, showing the polygonal presbytery at the top

The chapel was most likely constructed before 1326, when it was part of the castle complex. In the 14th century, it was a single-storey building with a crypt. It possessed a nave, as well as a polygonal presbytery, which was contained within the circumference of the castle's defensive walls.

In 1407, the chapel was rebuilt in the gothic style by order of King Ladislaus II Jagiello (Jogaila of Lithuania). After increasing the height of the walls, the chapel became a two-storey structure, maintaining the old crypt. The form of the church was dominated by two steep step-patterned gables which survived until the 1650s. The lowest level of the building was designated as a crypt for deceased chaplains and local administrators, while the upper levels were used for religious services. The polygonal presbytery as well as the square nave were rib-vaulted. The vaulting of the nave was supported by a centrally-planned pillar. This structural element was typical for the sacral and secular architecture during the reign of Casimir III the Great.

During the Renaissance, the church maintained a Gothic character, however the entrance was positioned on the first floor (that is, one floor above ground-level) and was framed by a new Renaissance portal, made in the Komasków masonry workshop. It wasn't until the 17th century that the façade of the chapel was crested with a gable and attic in the style of the Lublin Renaissance. During the parliamentary sessions in 1569 regarding the Union of Lublin, a holy mass was held at the Holy Trinity Chapel, asking for successful deliberations. Some of participants left inscriptions on the walls of the chapel commemorating the event.

Extensive fresco work was conducted in the interior of the church in the 1410s by an anonymous team of Ruthenian painters under the supervision of Master Andrey. It was during this time that the walls and ceiling were covered in a Rutheno-Byzantine polychrome. The paintings were completed in 1418, which is noted in Cyrillic on the patronage tablet, located on the arch between the nave and the presbytery of the church. Along with religious scenes decorating the interior of the church, there are two portraits of King Ladislaus II, the patron of the painting project. The polychrome was conducted with various techniques: both on dry and wet plaster with tempera paint.

During the construction of the new prison complex within the castle, in the years 1823–1826, the church was adjoined to the neogothic structures and became the prison chapel. The interior and exterior were then plastered over, destroying the priceless polychrome. Toward the end of the 19th century, the chapel underwent a number of small changes: the exterior stairs were dismantled and the portal was converted into a window. In 1897 Józef Smoliński discovered part of the 15th-century polychrome. In the years 1917–1918, further portions of the paintings were uncovered.

== Renovations and Reinforcement Projects ==
The church underwent a complete renovation in the 1950s, after the castle was designated to serve cultural purposes. Around the year 1970, ceramic tiles were removed from the chapel roof and were replaced with metal sheeting. The exterior plaster was removed and the historical frescoes were reconstructed. The paintings' renovation was completed in the 1990s.

In August 2007, the chapel underwent work meant to rectify cracks that had developed in the walls of the presbytery. Large concrete supports were installed under the foundations of the chapel. Cracks, some even 1 cm wide, had developed due to rainfall, which had removed sediment from underneath the foundations. It is possible that the damage occurred more than a hundred years ago. More than two thousand litres of binding substance, a mixture of white cement and lime paste, were injected. The ceiling of the presbytery was laden with a carbon-fibre reinforcing net submerged in a mineral matrix. A steel band was installed above the ceiling to support the entire structure. The last phase of the renovation work took place in the spring of 2008: the signs of cracking were corrected and covered with reconstructed frescoes.

== Frescoes ==
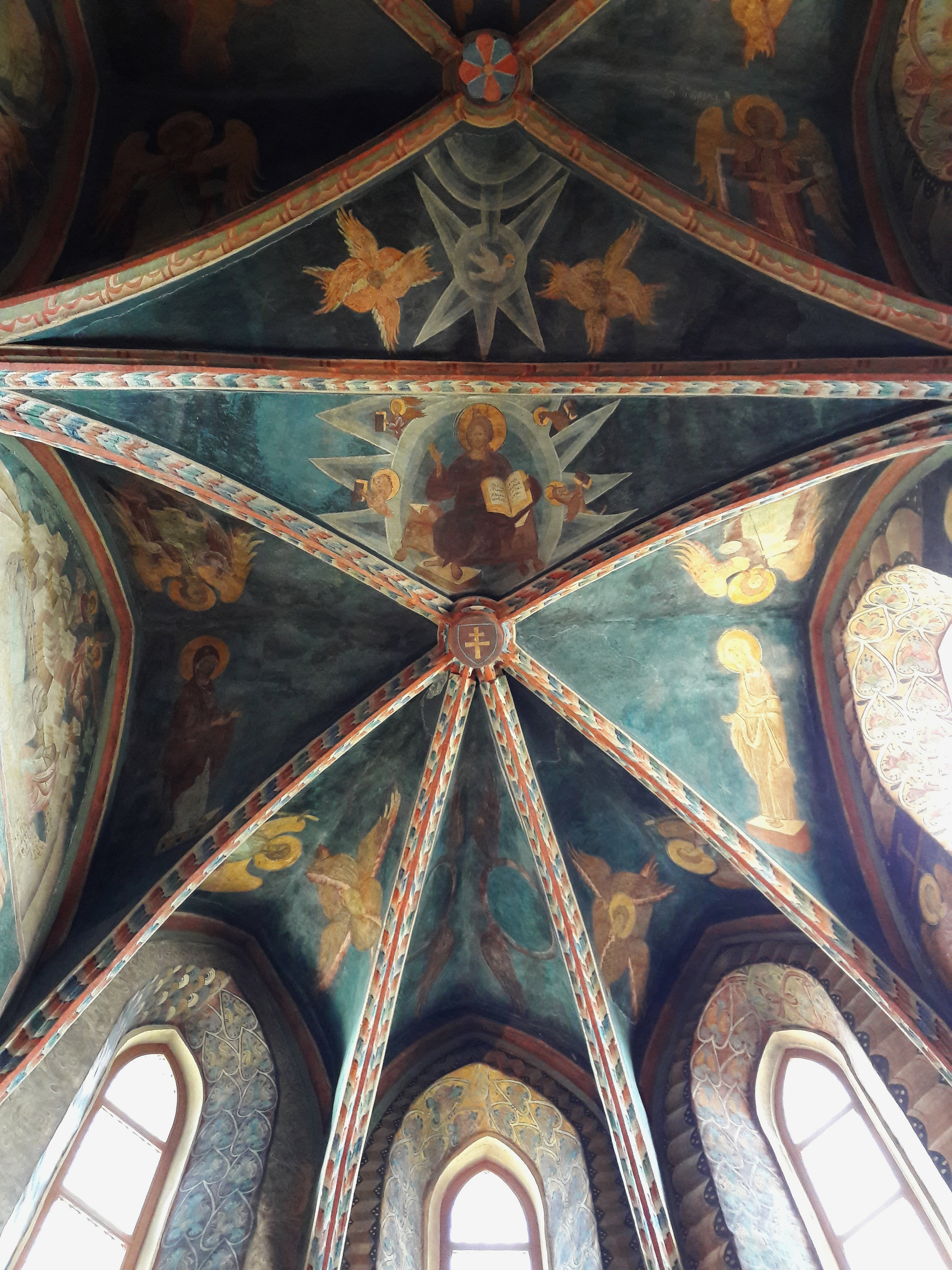
Gothic apse vault

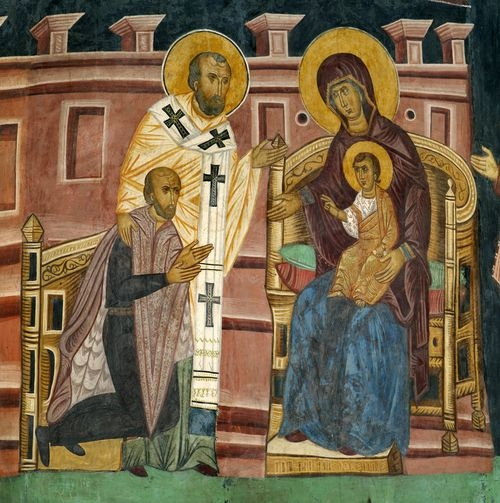
Ladislaus II Jagiello kneeling before the Blessed Virgin Mary

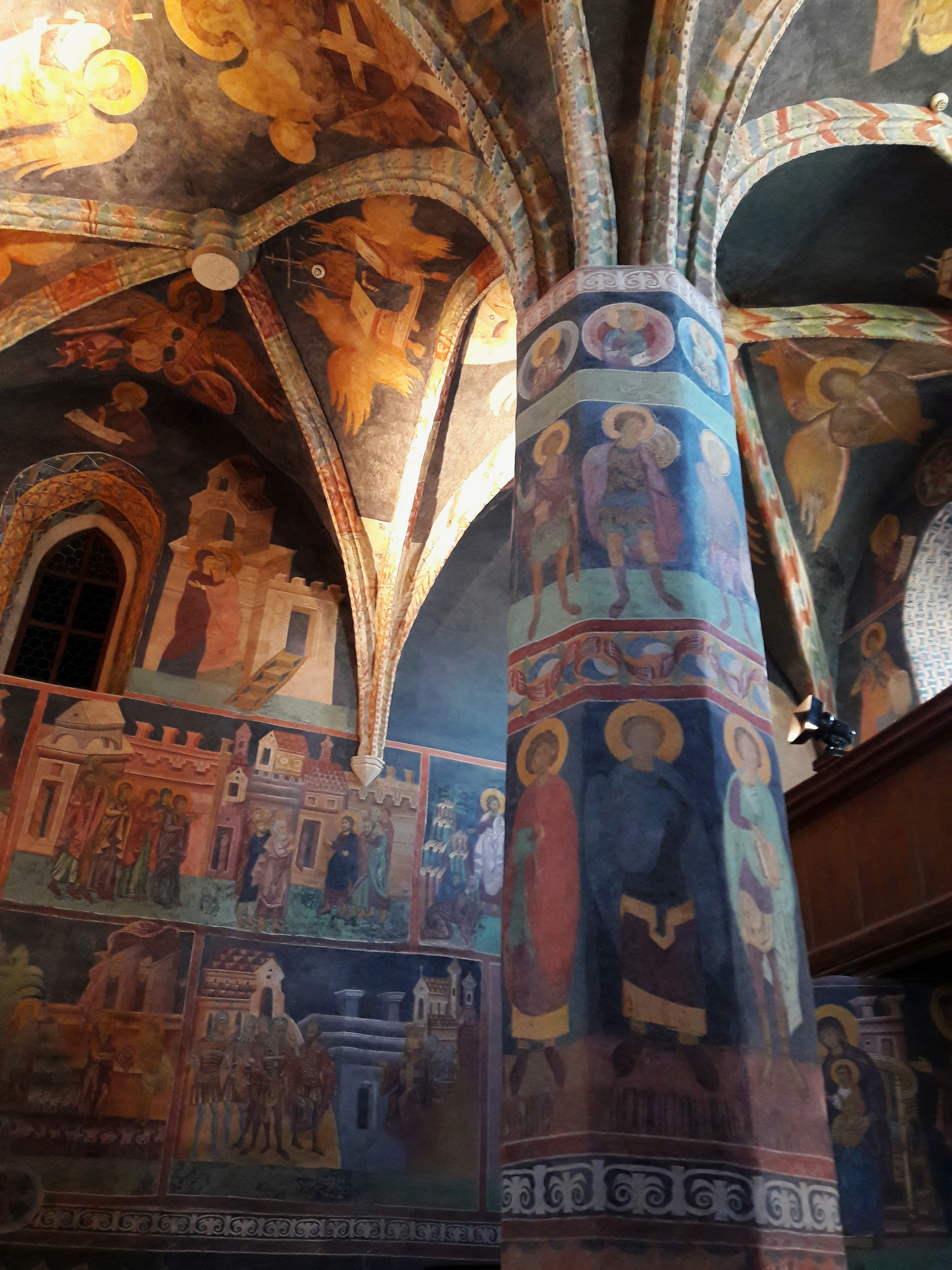
Frescoes in the nave

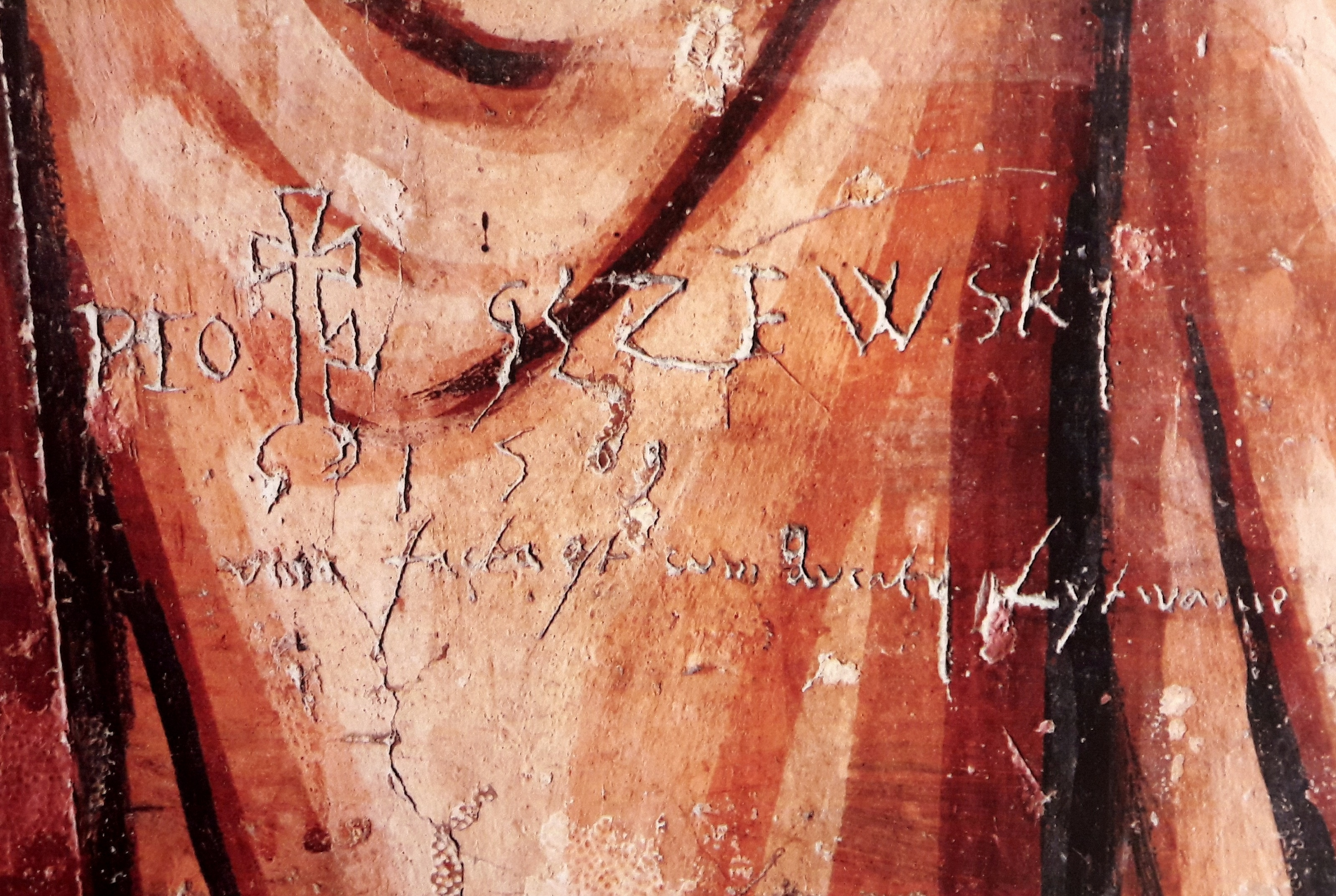
Graffiti commemorating Union of Lublin in 1569

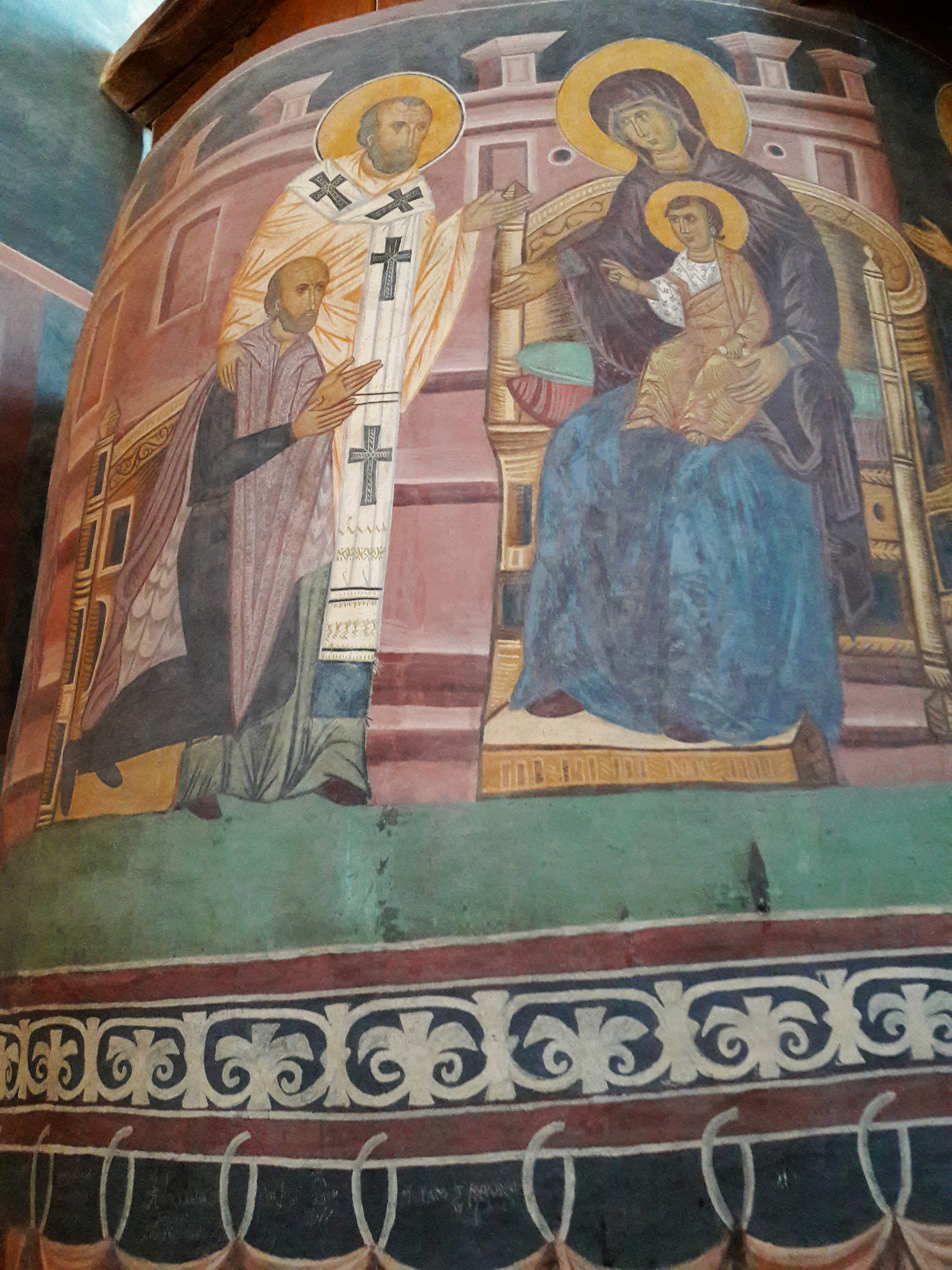

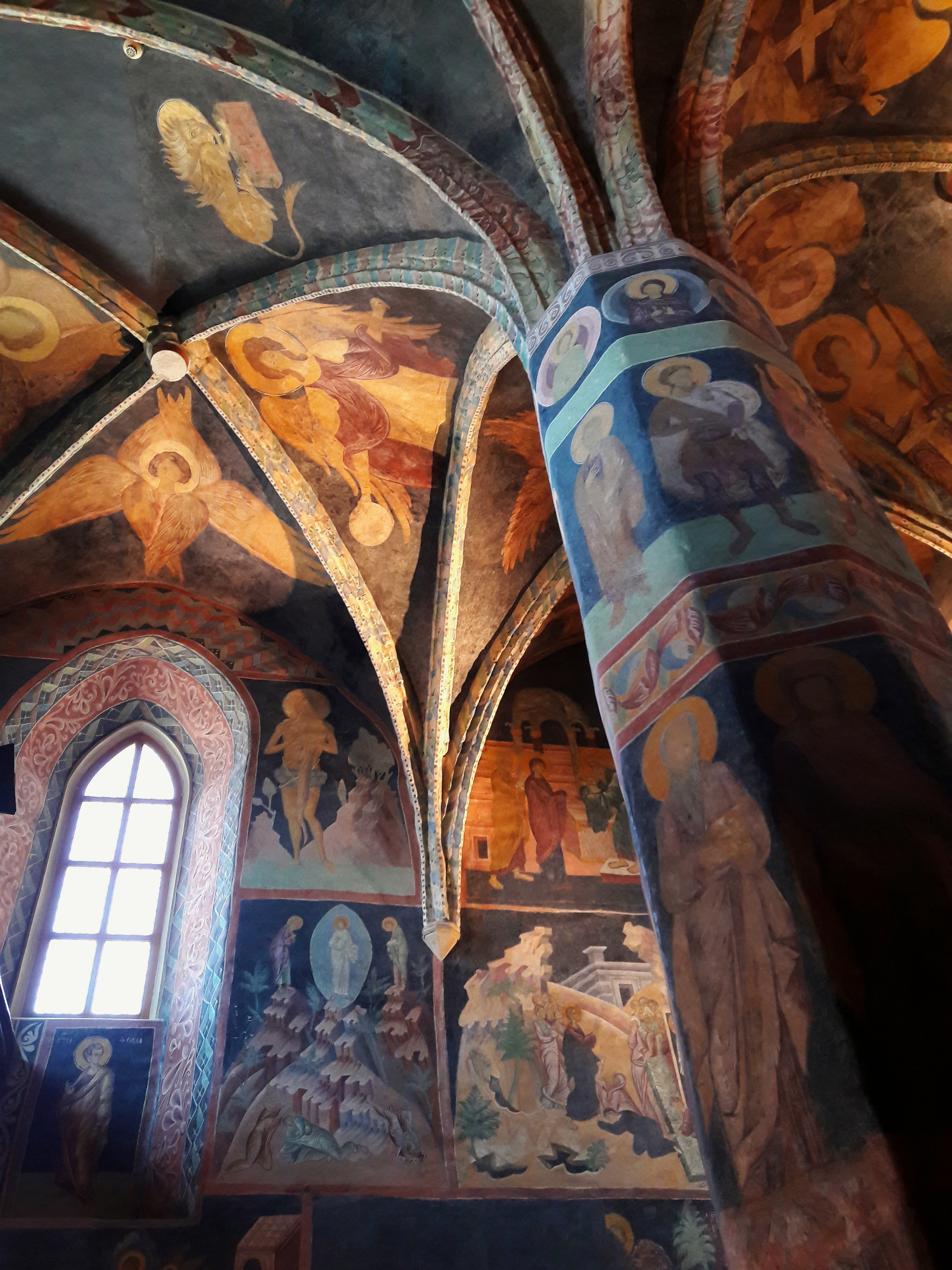

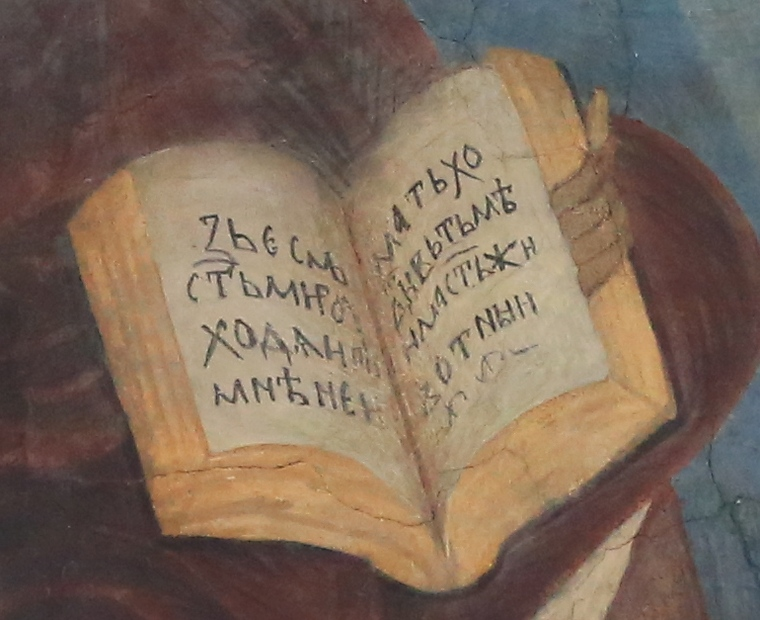

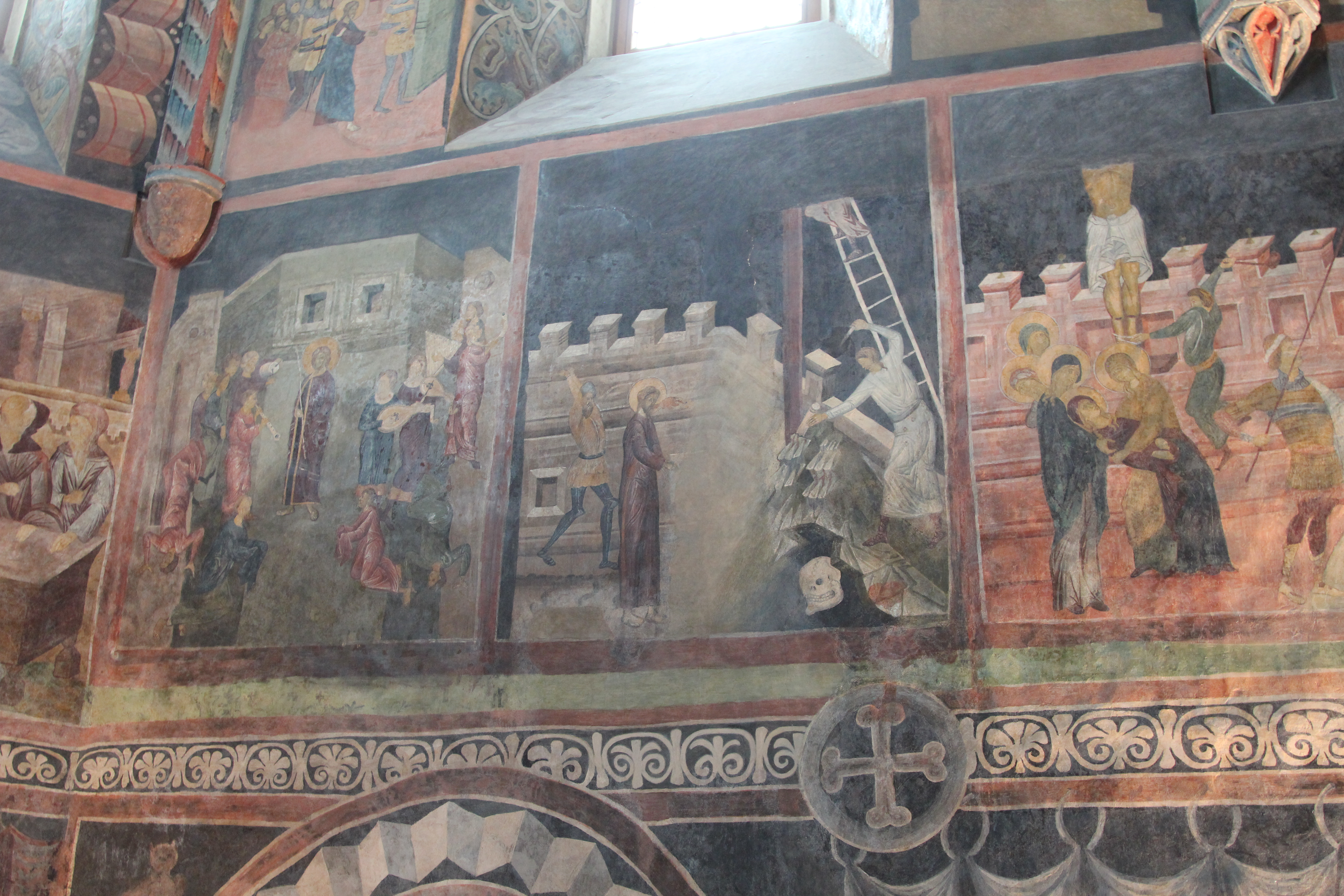

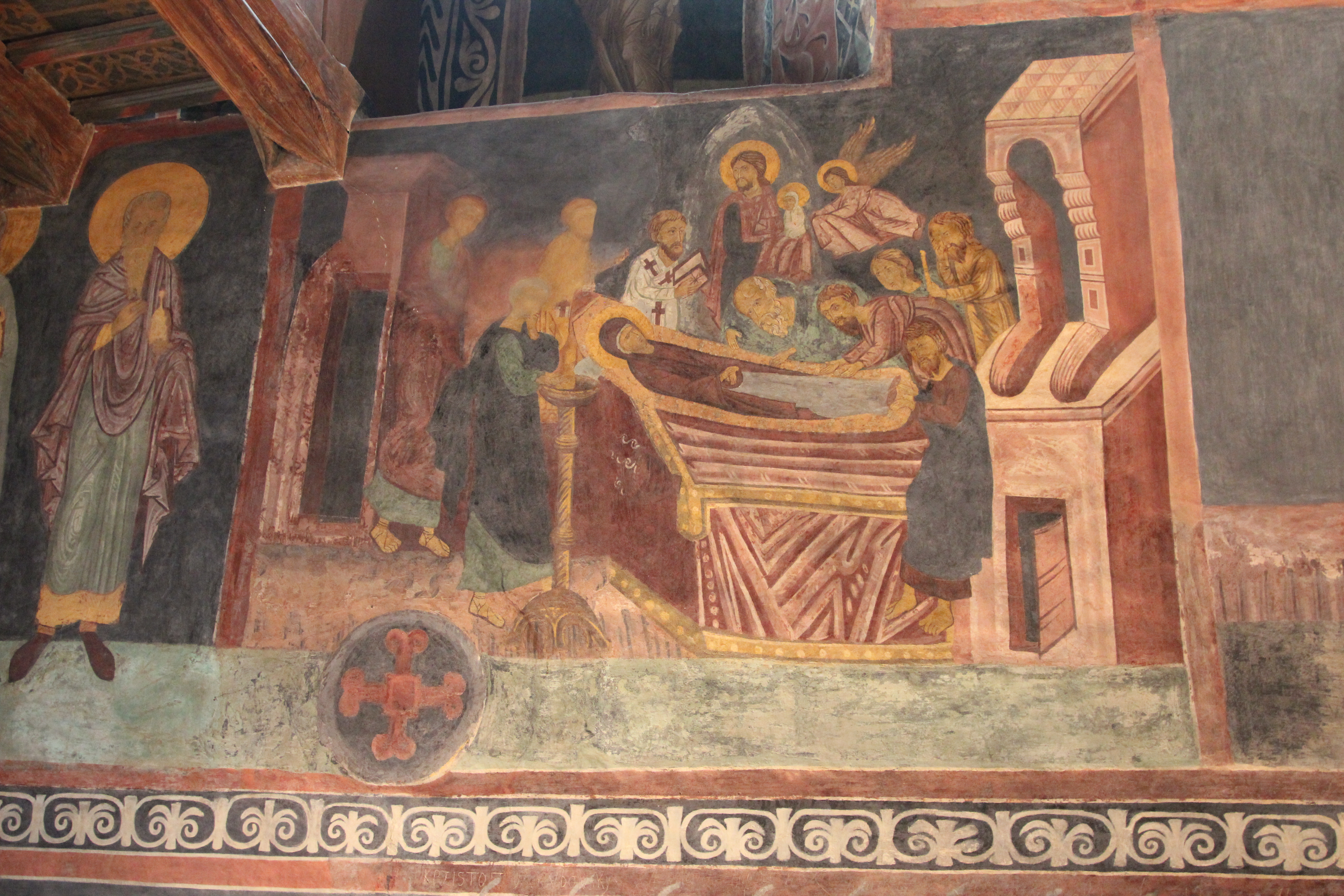

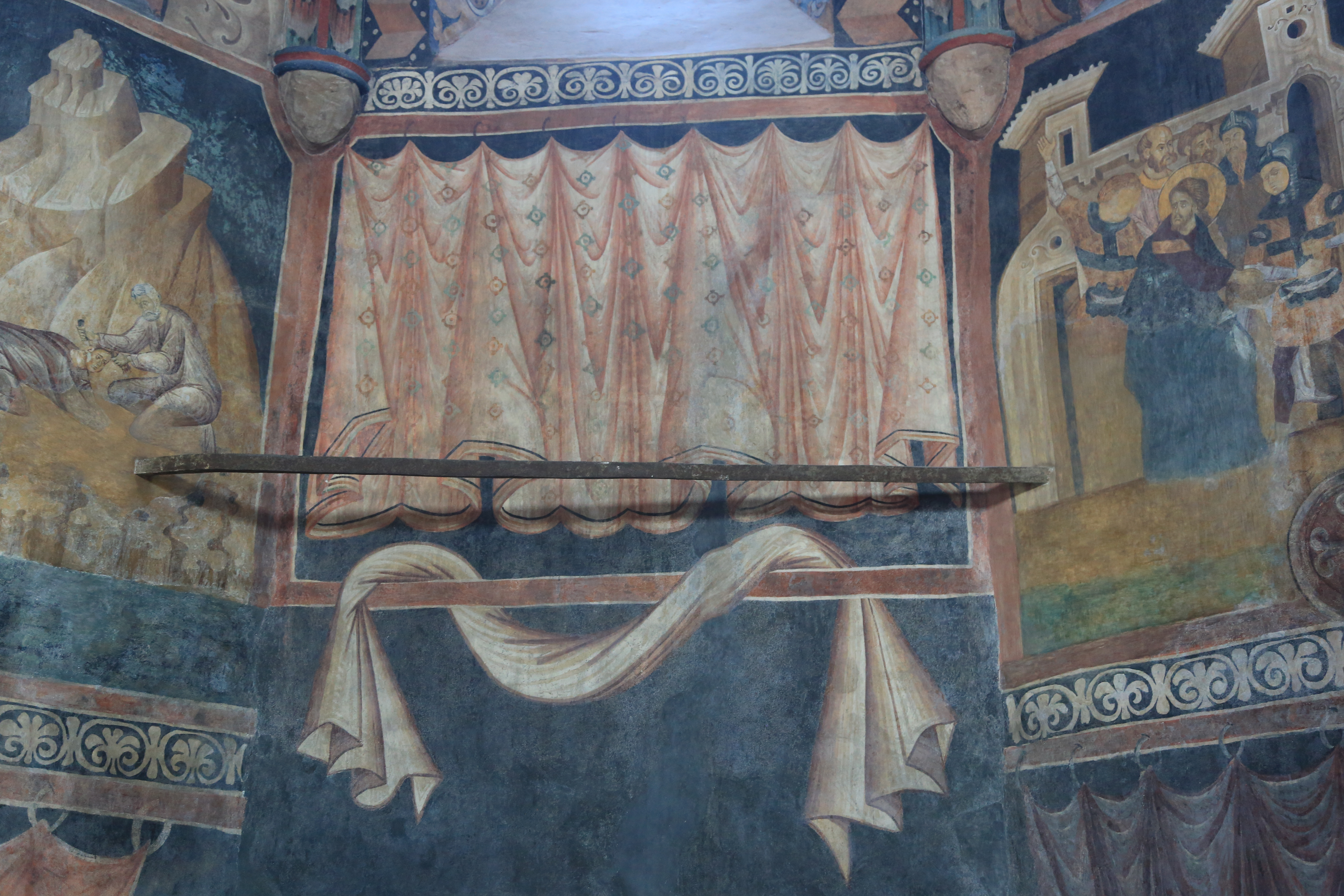

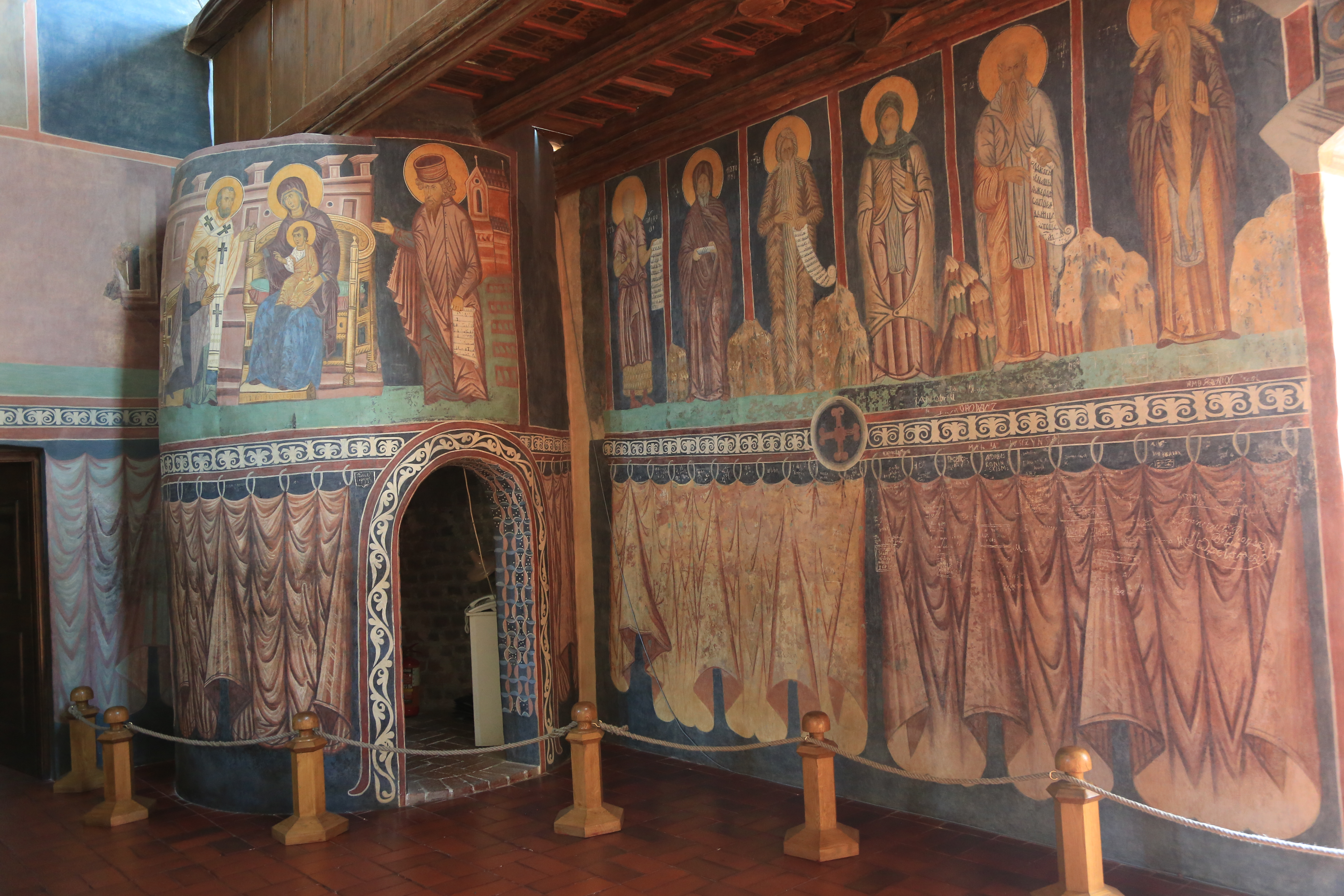

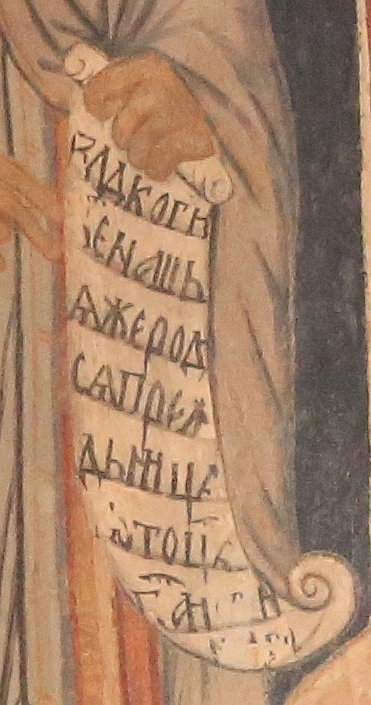

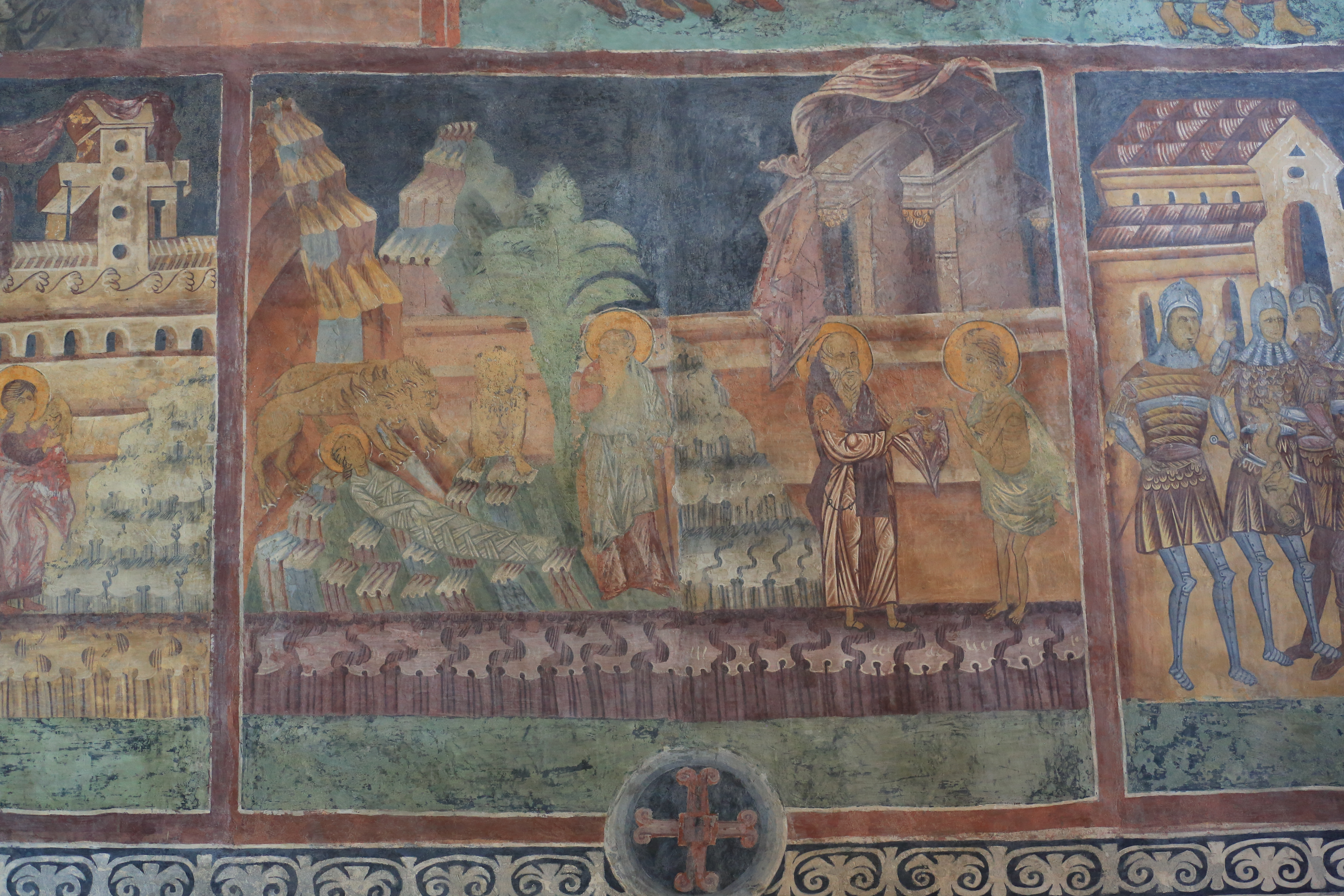

== See also ==
- National Museum, Lublin
