= Lublin Castle =

Lublin Royal Castle Zamek Lubelski (in Polish)
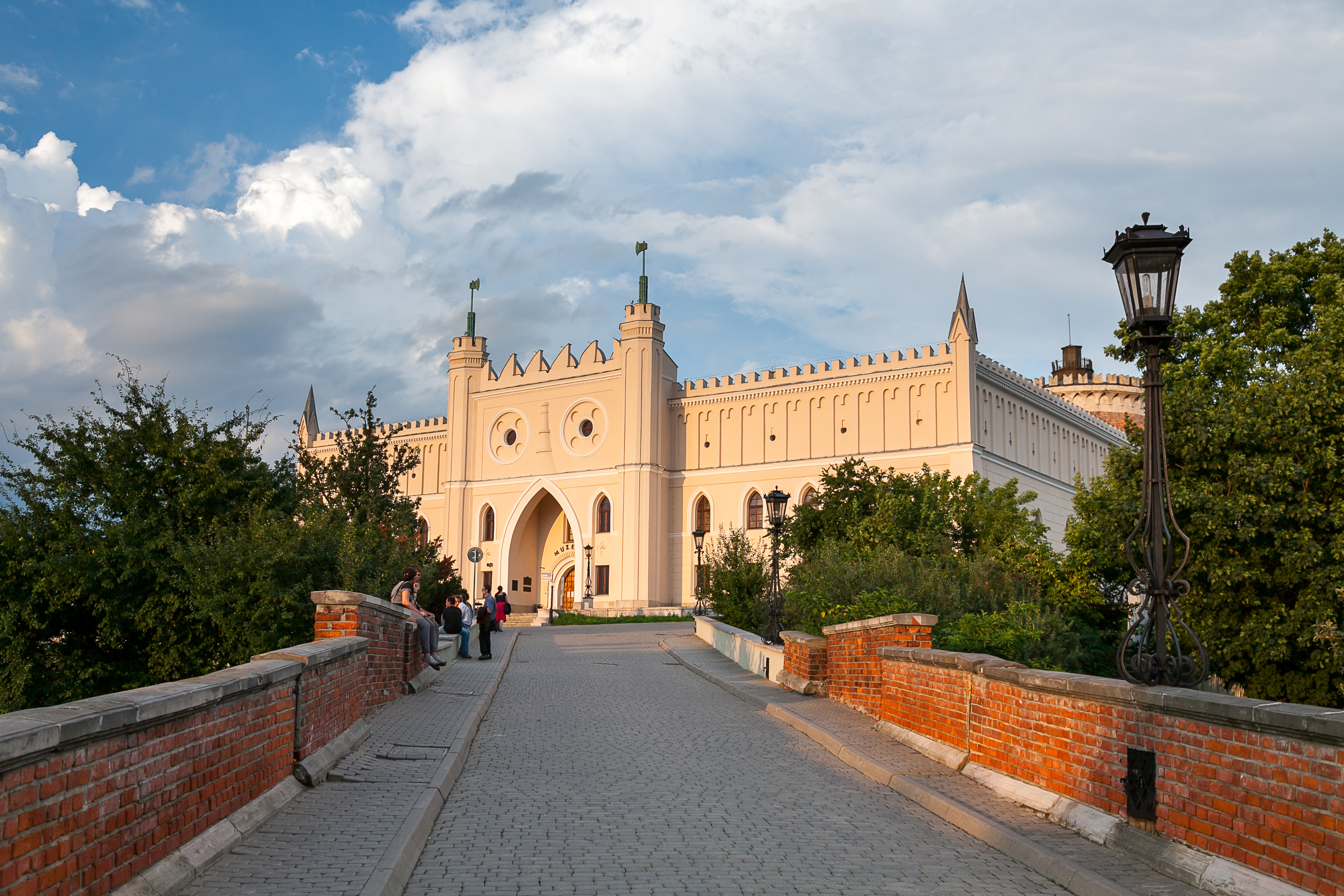
- Lublin Castle

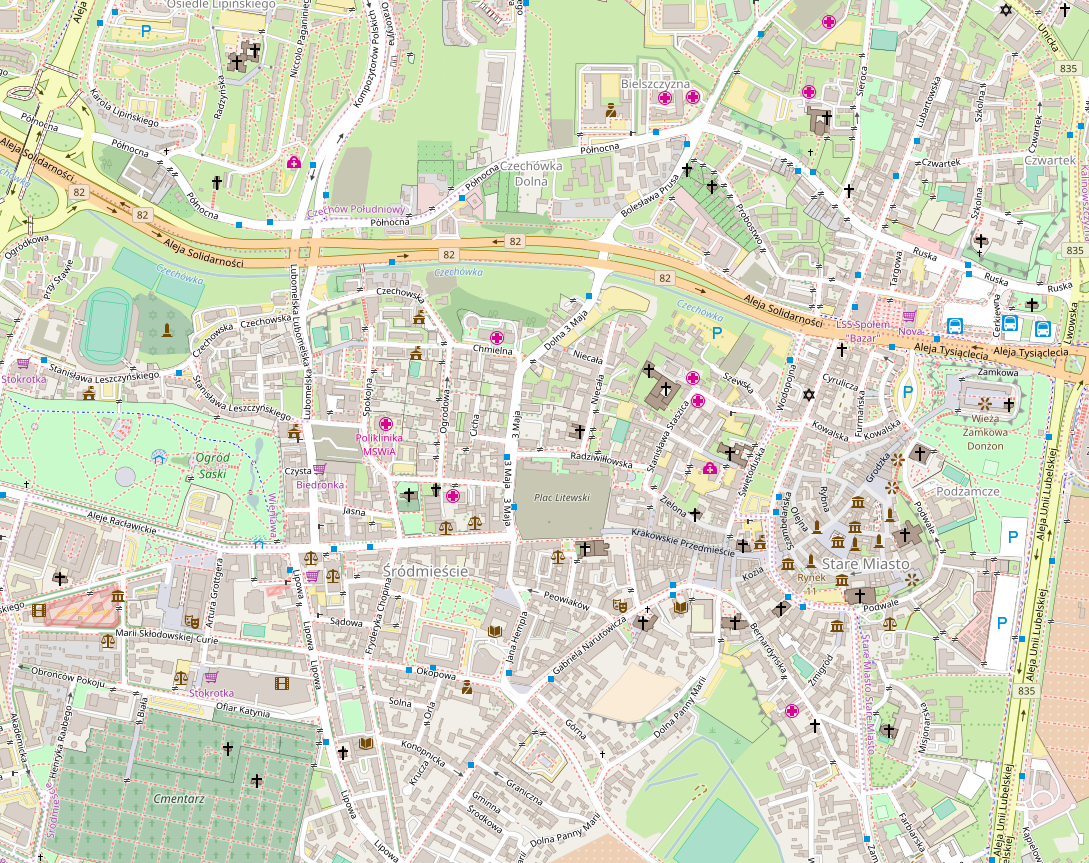
- Location within Lublin

General information
- Architectural style: Polish Gothic-Gothic Revival
- Location: Lublin, Poland
- Coordinates: 51°15′02″N 22°34′20″E
- Construction started: 12th century
- Demolished: 1655−1657, rebuilt 1826-1828 as prison
- Client: Casimir II the Just

Historic Monument of Poland
- Designated: 2007-04-25
- Part of: Lublin – historic architectural and urban ensemble
- Reference no.: Dz. U. z 2007 r. Nr 86, poz. 574

The Lublin Castle (Polish: Zamek Lubelski) is a medieval castle in Lublin, Poland, adjacent to the Old Town district and close to the city center. It is one of the oldest preserved royal residencies in Poland, initially established by High Duke Casimir II the Just. Its contemporary Gothic Revival appearance is largely due to a reconstruction undertaken in the 19th century.

== History ==
The hill it is on was first fortified with a wood-reinforced earthen wall in the 12th century. In the first half of the 13th century, the stone keep was built. It still survives and is the tallest building of the castle, as well as the oldest standing building in the city. In the 14th century, during the reign of Casimir III the Great, the castle was rebuilt with stone walls. Probably at the same time, the castle's Chapel of the Holy Trinity was built as a royal chapel.

In the first decades of the 15th century, King Władysław II Jagiełło commissioned a set of frescoes for the chapel. They were completed in 1418 and are preserved to this day. The artist was a Ruthenian, Master Andrej, who signed his work on one of the walls. Because of their unique style, mixing Western and Eastern Orthodox influences, they are acclaimed internationally as an important historical monument.

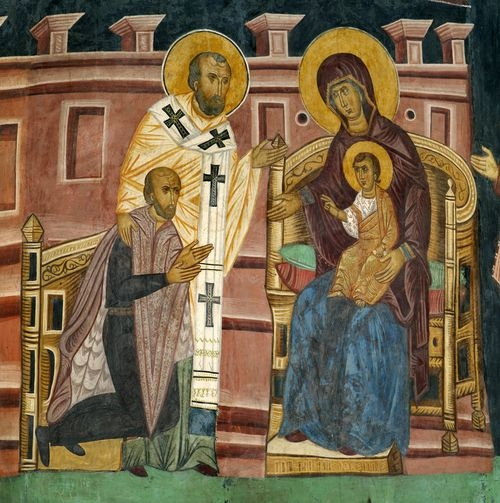
Władysław II Jagiełło kneeling before the Blessed Virgin Mary. Detail of a fresco in the Gothic Holy Trinity Chapel, 1418.

Under the rule of the Jagiellon dynasty the castle enjoyed royal favor and frequent stays by members of the royal family. The sons of King Casimir IV Jagiellon were brought up in the castle under the tutelage of Jan Długosz. In the 16th century, it was rebuilt on a grandiose scale, under the direction of Italian masters brought from Kraków. The most momentous event in the castle's history was the signing in 1569 of the Union of Lublin, the founding act of the Polish–Lithuanian Commonwealth.

As a consequence of the wars in the 17th century (The Deluge), the castle fell into disrepair. Only the oldest sections, the keep and the chapel, remained intact. After Lublin fell under Russian rule following the territorial settlement of the Congress of Vienna in 1815, the government of Congress Poland, on the initiative of Stanisław Staszic, carried out a complete reconstruction of the castle between 1826 and 1828. The new buildings were in the English neo-Gothic style, completely different from the structures they replaced, and their new purpose was to house a criminal prison. Only the keep and the chapel were preserved in their original state.

The castle was a prison for the next 128 years: as a Tsarist prison from 1831 to 1915, in independent Poland from 1918 to 1939, and most infamously during the Nazi German occupation from 1939 to 1944. Under Tsarist Russia prisoners included Polish resistance members, one of the most notable being writer Bolesław Prus. When between 40,000 and 80,000 inmates, many of them Polish resistance fighters and Jews, passed through. During World War II, the Castle Chapel was the location of a German court. Many prisoners were sent from the castle to concentration camps, including nearby Majdanek. Just before withdrawing on 22 July 1944, the SS and German prison officers massacred over 300 of the remaining prisoners. After 1944, the castle continued as a prison of the Soviet secret police and later of the Soviet-installed communist regime of Poland and, until 1954, about 35,000 Poles fighting against the new communist government (especially cursed soldiers) passed through it, of whom 333 died.

In 1954, the castle prison was closed. Following reconstruction and refurbishment, since 1957 it has been the main site of the National Museum.

== Gallery ==
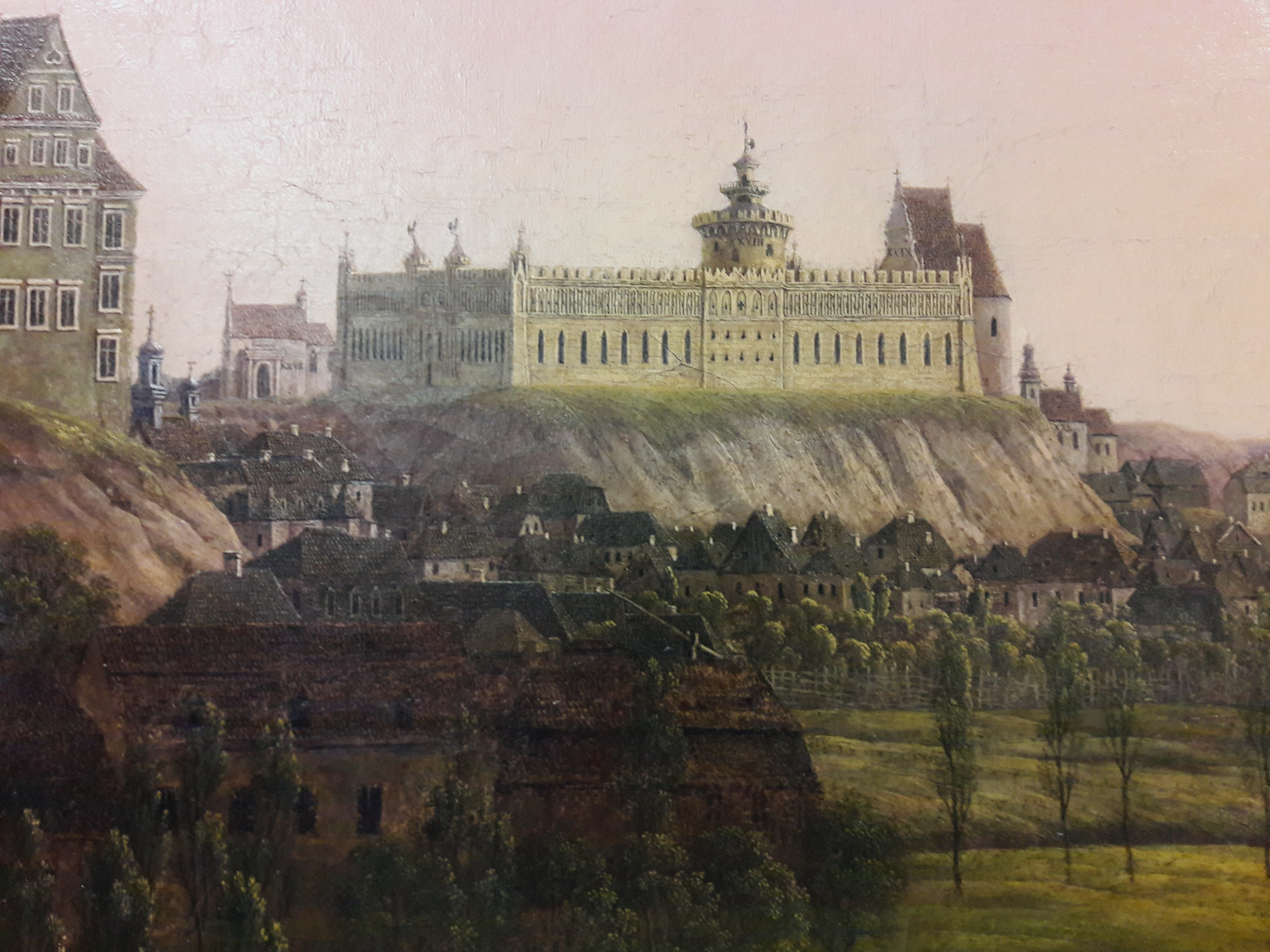
View of the castle in 1826

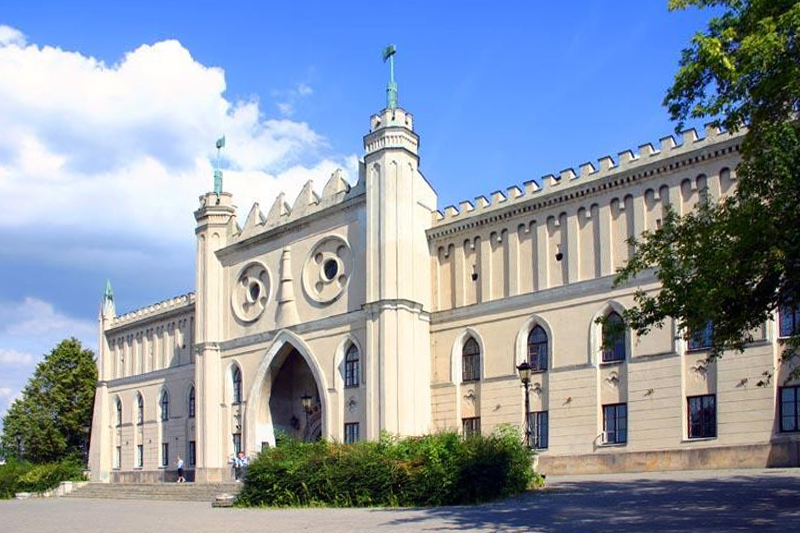
Main entrance gate of the neo-gothic part of the building

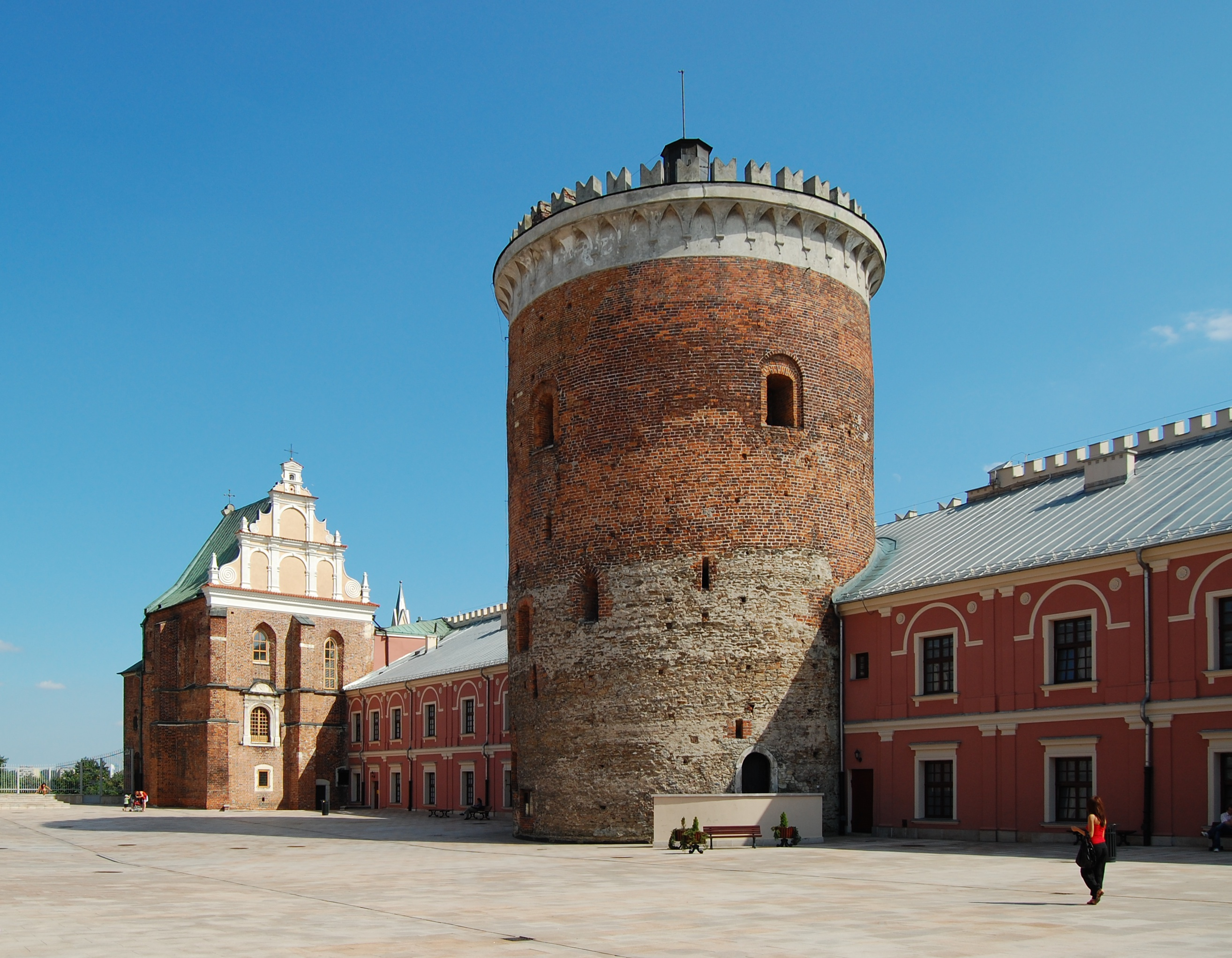
The keep and the Holy Trinity Chapel seen from the castle's courtyard

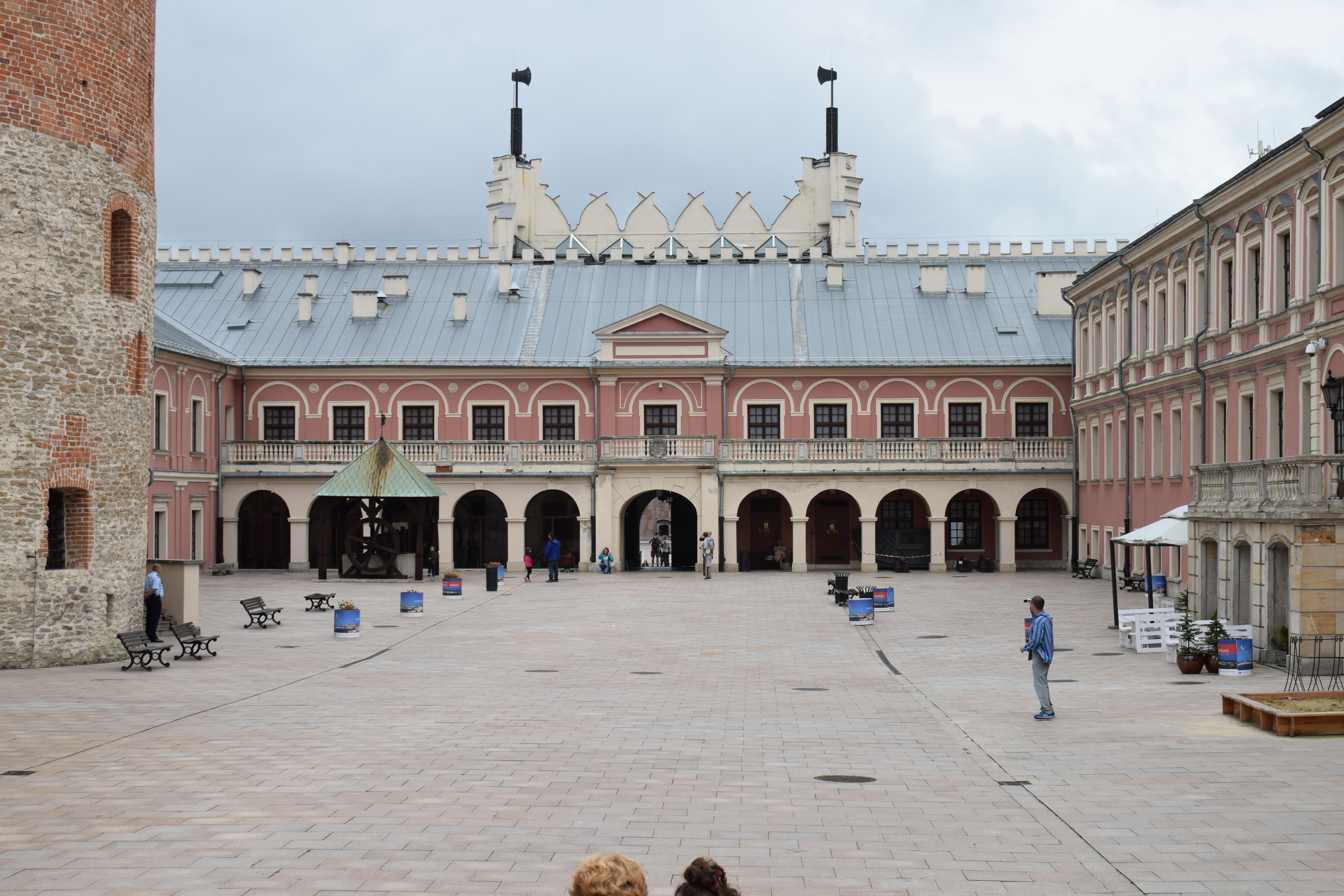
Courtyard of the castle

== See also ==
- Castles in Poland
