= National Museum, Lublin =

Museum in Lublin, Poland

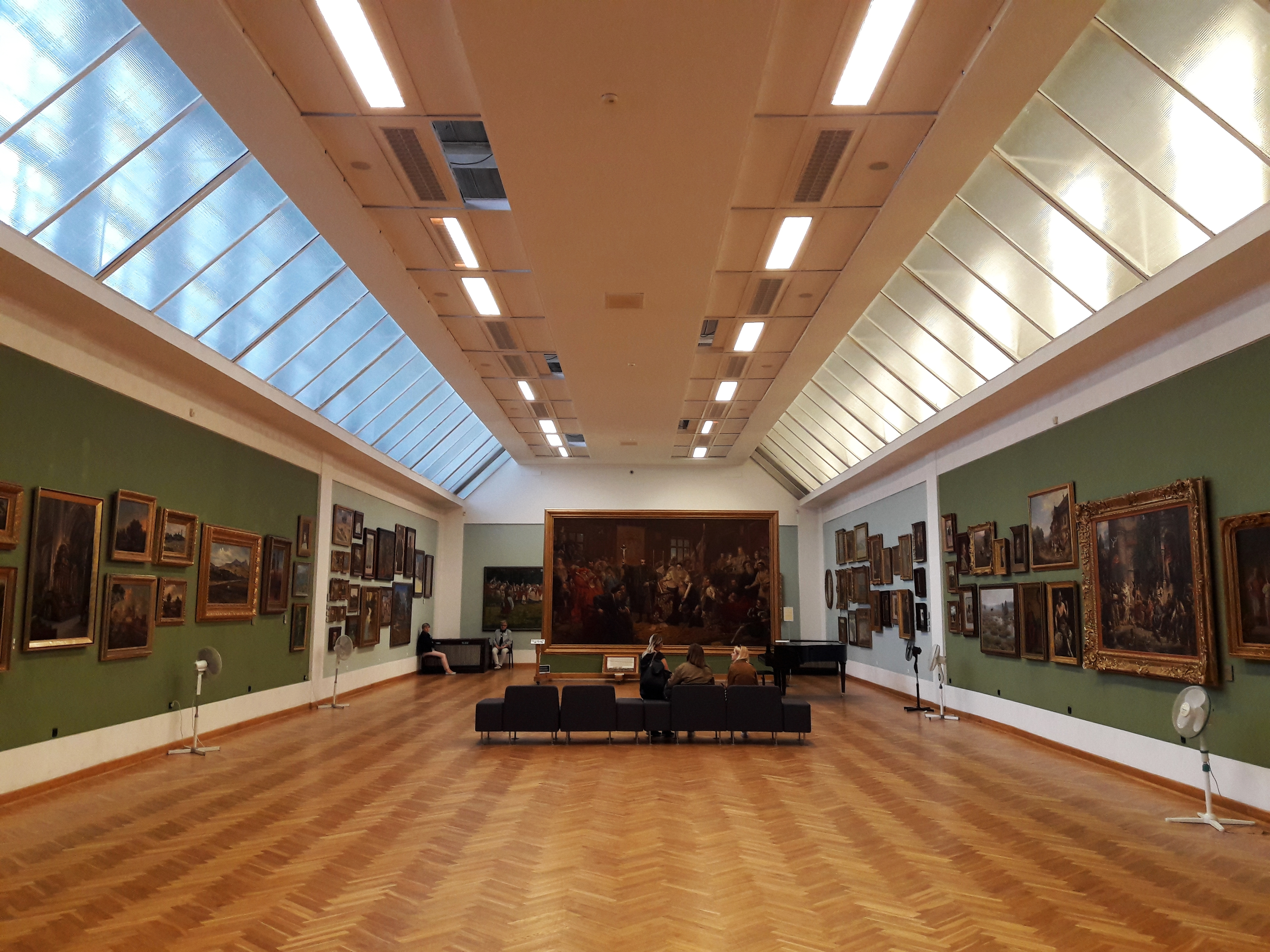
- Gallery of 19th-century painting

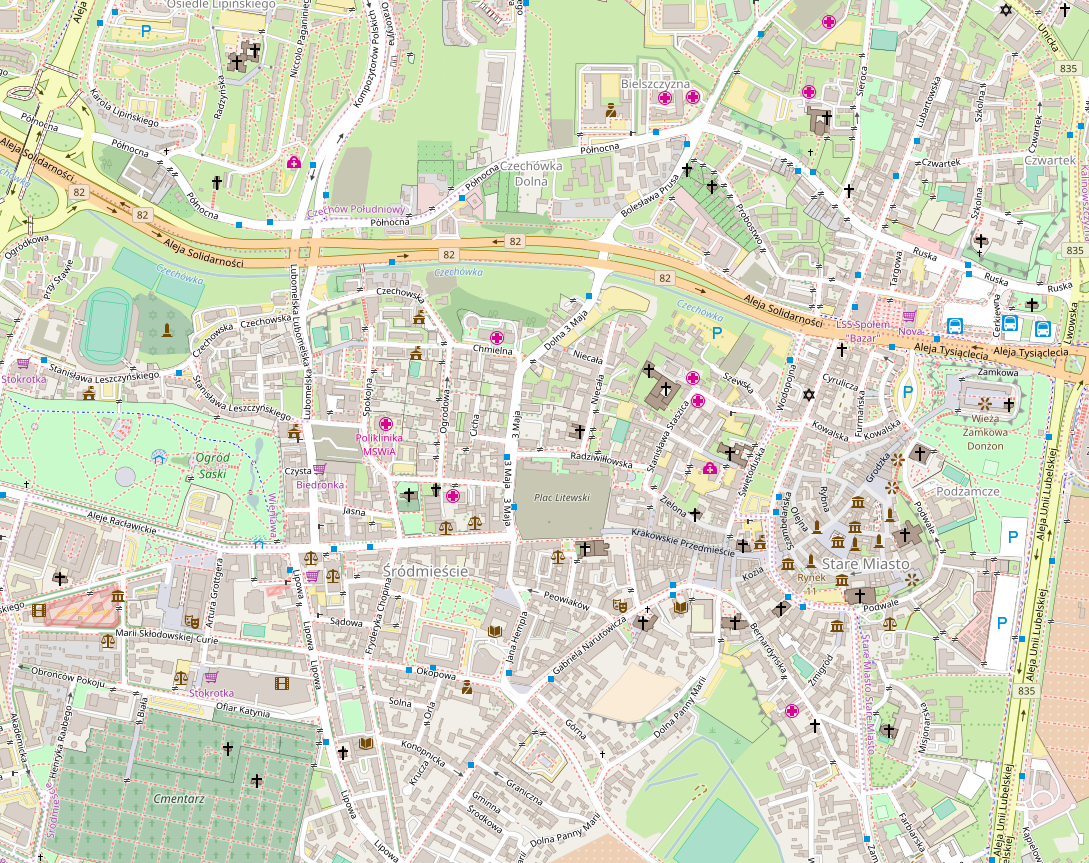
- Location within the city of Lublin
- Established: 1914
- Location: Lublin, Poland
- Coordinates: 51°15′02″N 22°34′20″E
- Collections: Archaeology, Painting, Decorative arts
- Directors: Katarzyna Mieczkowska, Ph.D.
- Website: www.mnwl.pl

The National Museum in Lublin (Polish: Muzeum Narodowe w Lublinie) is one of the oldest and largest museums in Eastern Poland, located in Lublin. It was created in 1914, and received its own building in 1923.

== History ==
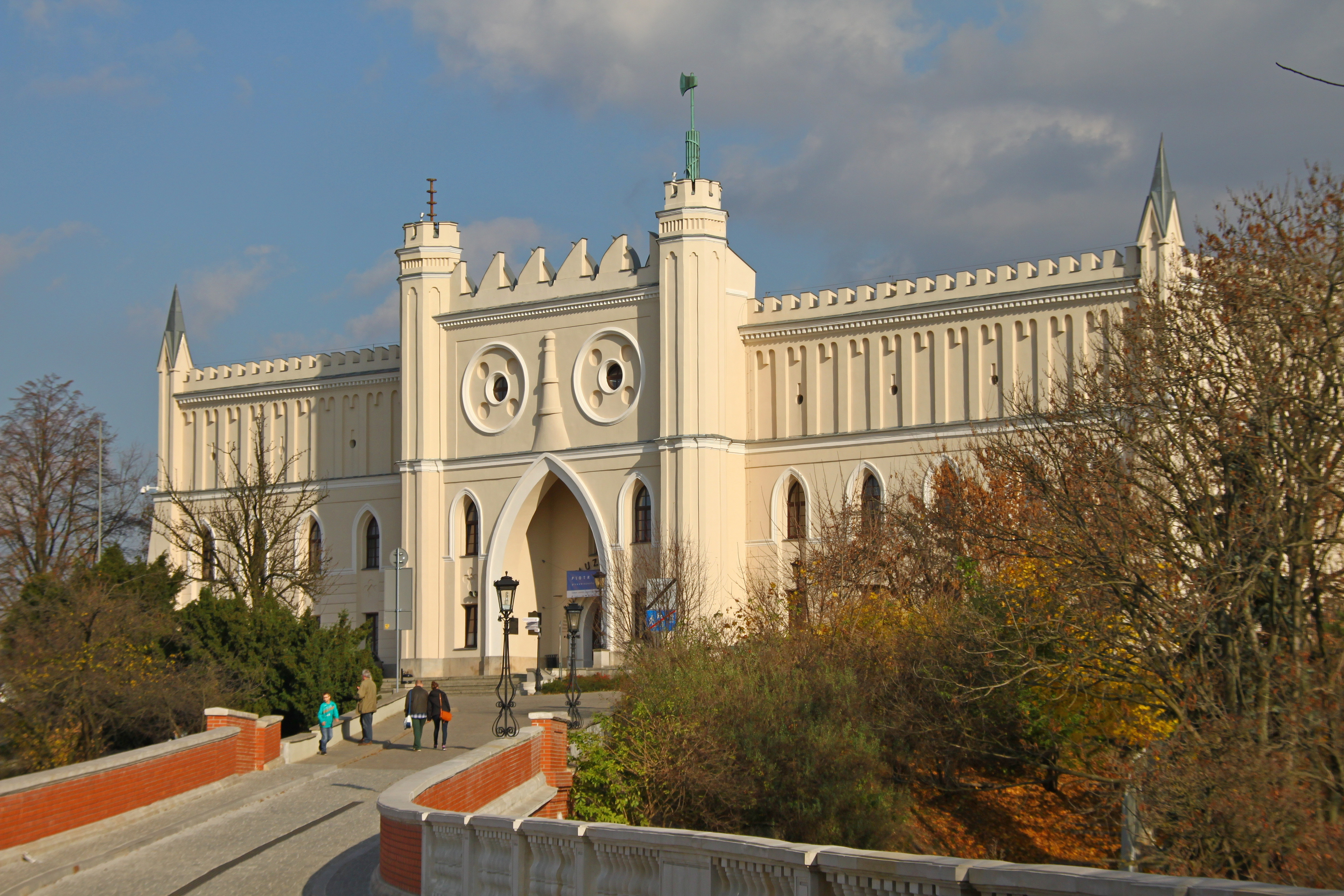
Lublin Castle

The history of the Lublin Museum dates back to the beginning of the 20th century, and is associated with Hieronim Łopaciński, a junior high school teacher and a correspondent of the Academy of Learning, amateur historian, ethnographer, bibliophile and lover of antiquity. Thanks to his efforts in 1901, two exhibitions were organized in Lublin.

The exhibition of art and antiquities was opened on June 4 in the former Dominican Monastery. Approximately 4,000 exhibits were assembled – engravings, paintings, sculptures, decorative arts, documents, prints, manuscripts, excavated artefacts, guild artefacts, arms, coins, medals, stamps and maps. The industrial and agricultural exhibition was opened on June 22 with ethnographic section where folk costumes, wooden products and ritual art were presented.

In 1974, the premises of Lublin Castle were adapted for the needs of the District Museum in Lublin, established in 1950. The permanent exhibitions of painting, decorative arts, armaments, archaeological, ethnographic, and numismatic artefacts were opened. In 1987 the museum was renamed the Lublin Museum.

On 15 May 2020, the Lublin Museum was nationalized, and therefore officially promoted to the rank of a National Museum, seamlessly the ownership of museum was transferred from the local government (pol. Sejmik Województwa) and placed under the authority of Polish Ministry of Culture.

== Permanent collection ==
It has permanent collections for:

- Polish and foreign painting from the 17th to 20th century;
- Gallery of paintings by Tamara de Lempicka;
- Polish and foreign decorative arts;
- Polish historical and battle paintings;
- Painters and folk art from the Lublin Region;
- Coins and medals in Polish territories from the 10th to the 20th century;
- Polish and foreign armaments from the 14th to the 20th century.

== Gallery ==
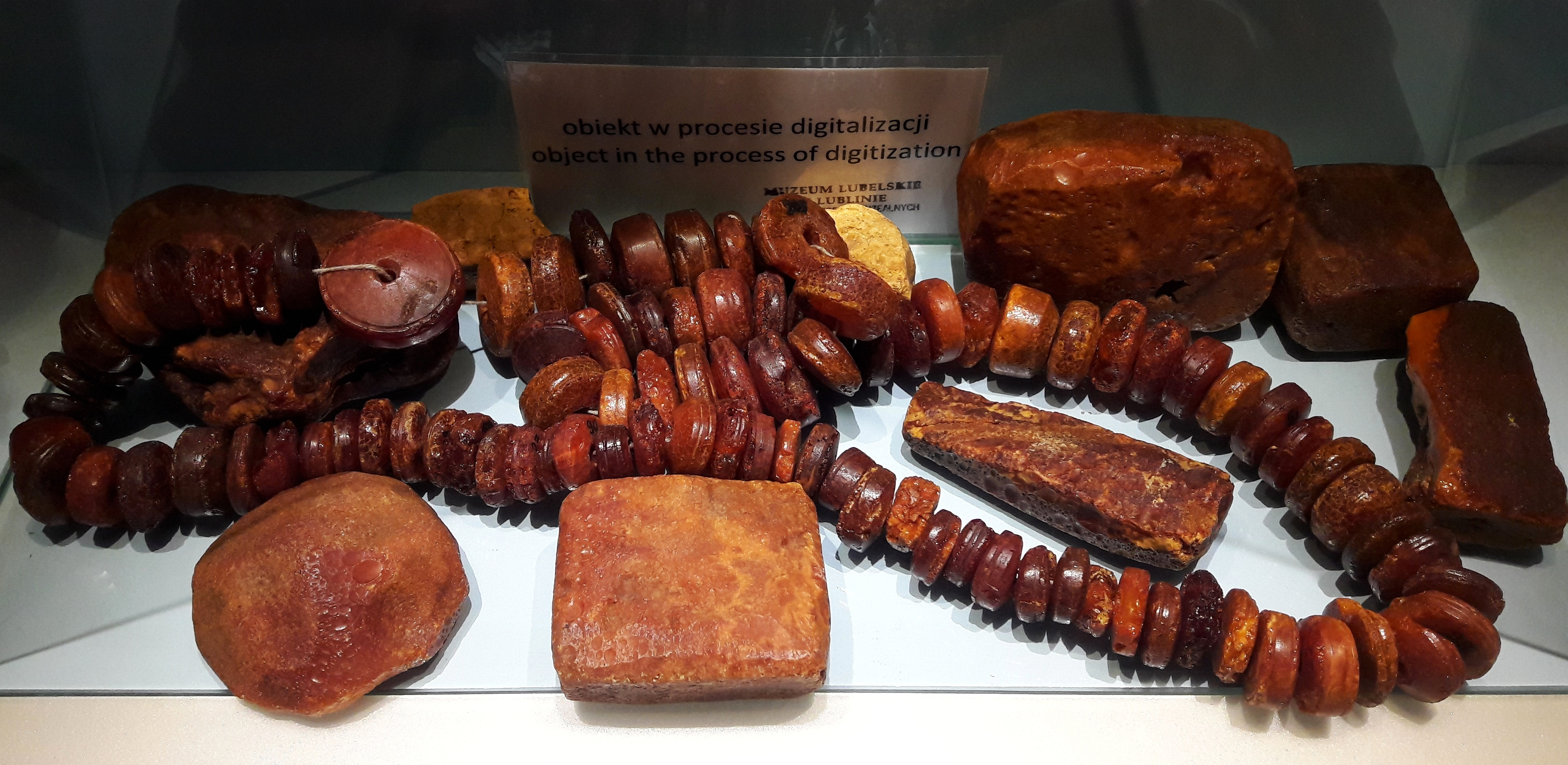
Amber hoard from Basonia

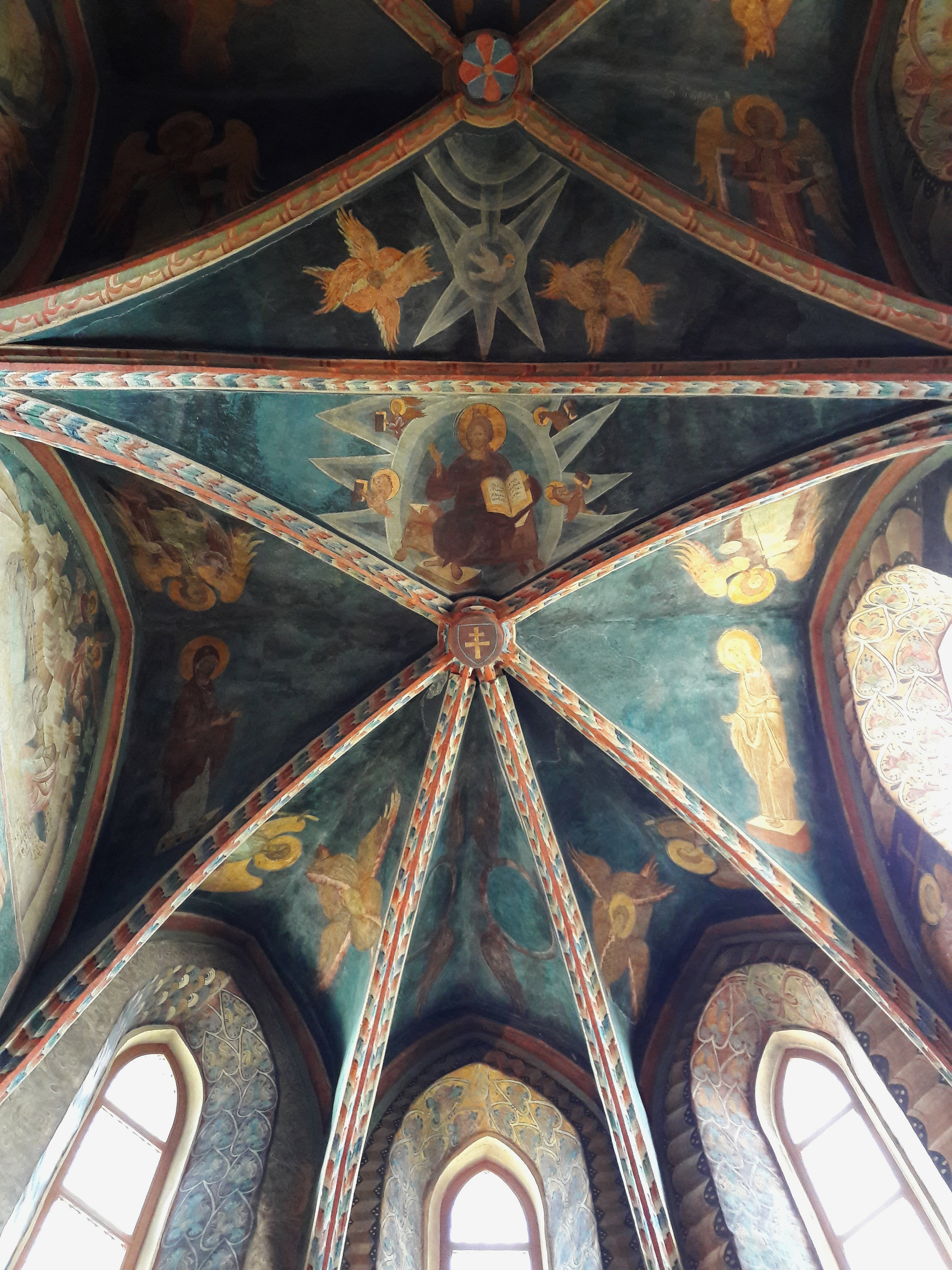
Gothic apse vault of the Holy Trinity Chapel

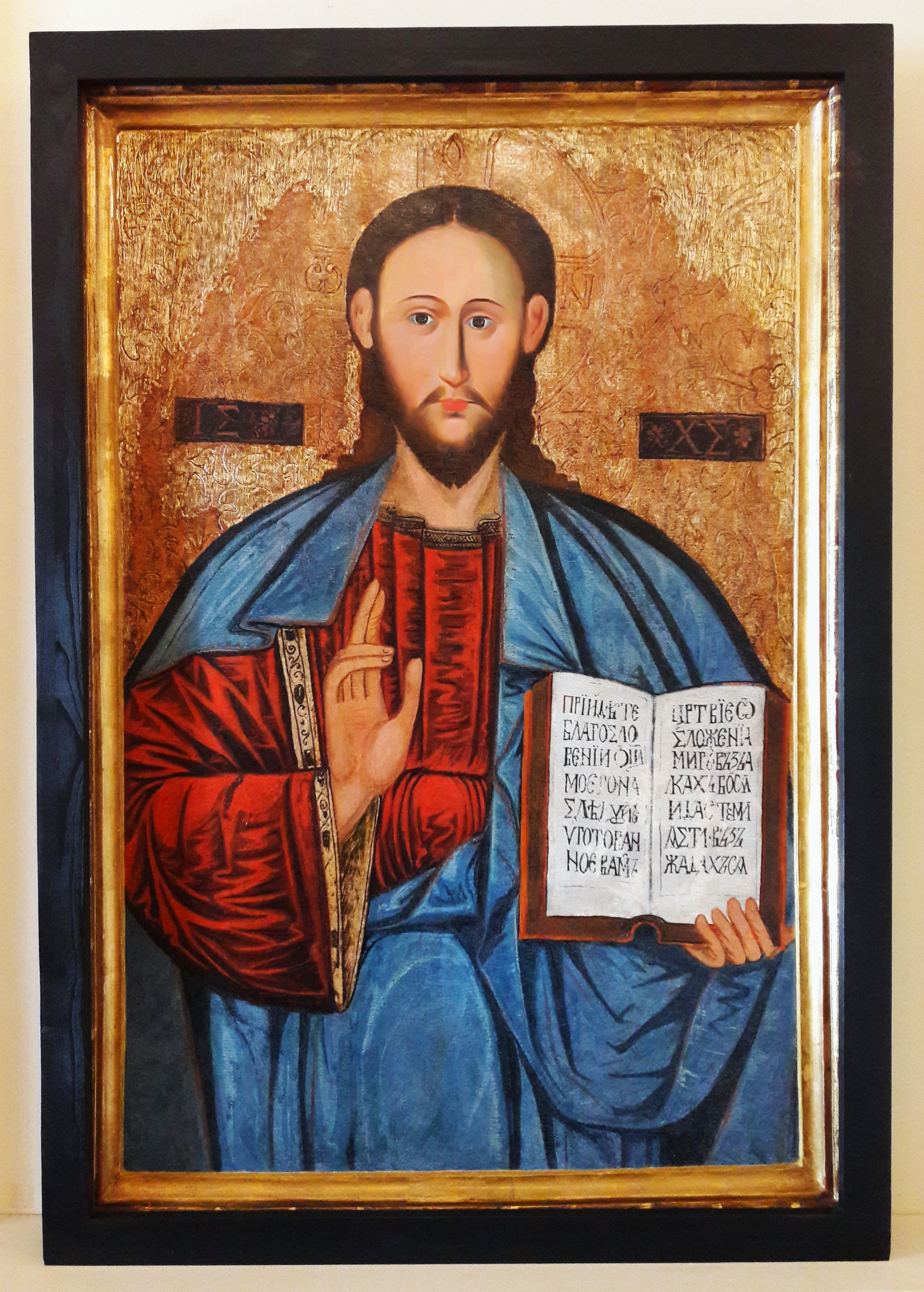
Pantocrator from Kułakowice

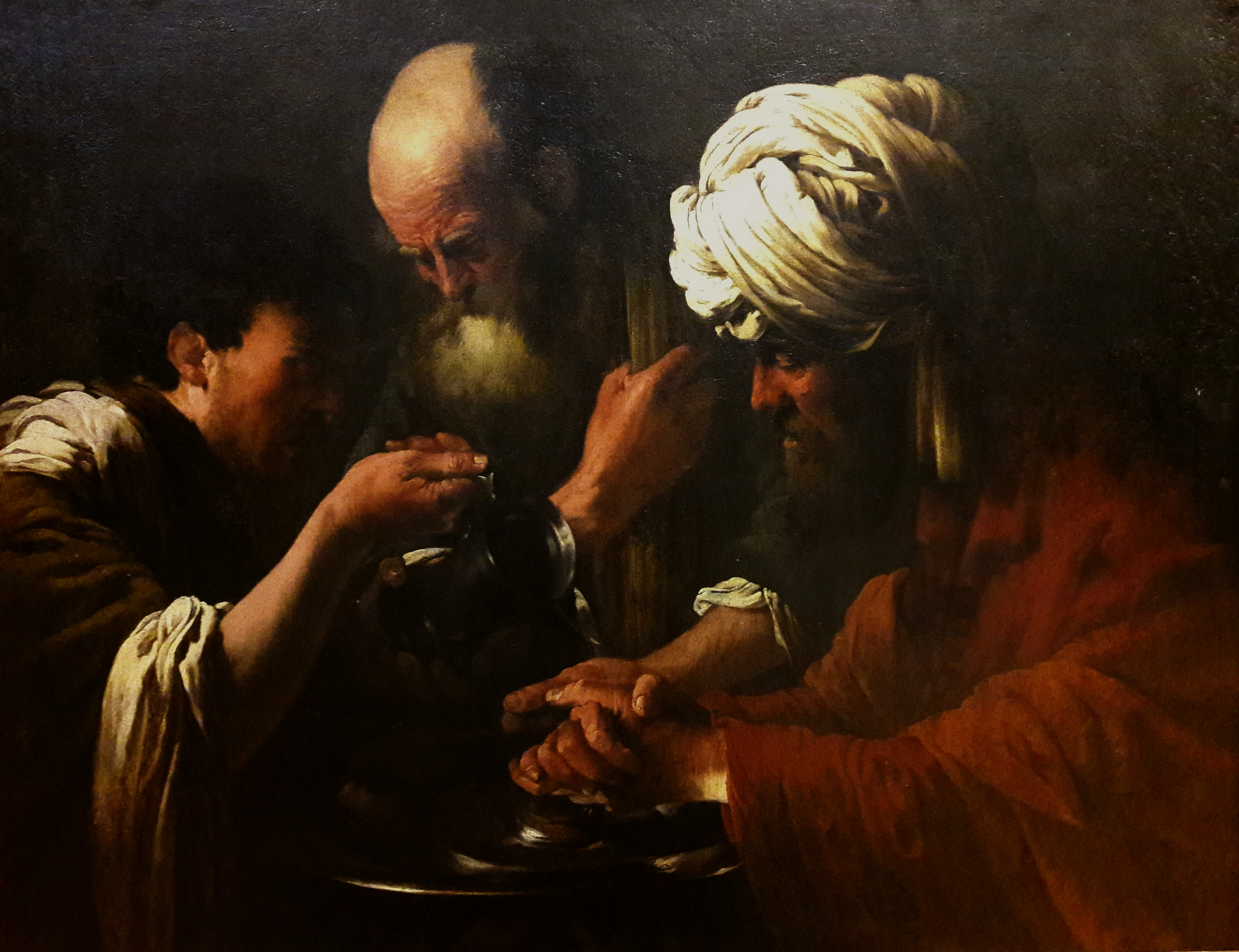
Pilate washing his hands by Hendrick ter Brugghen

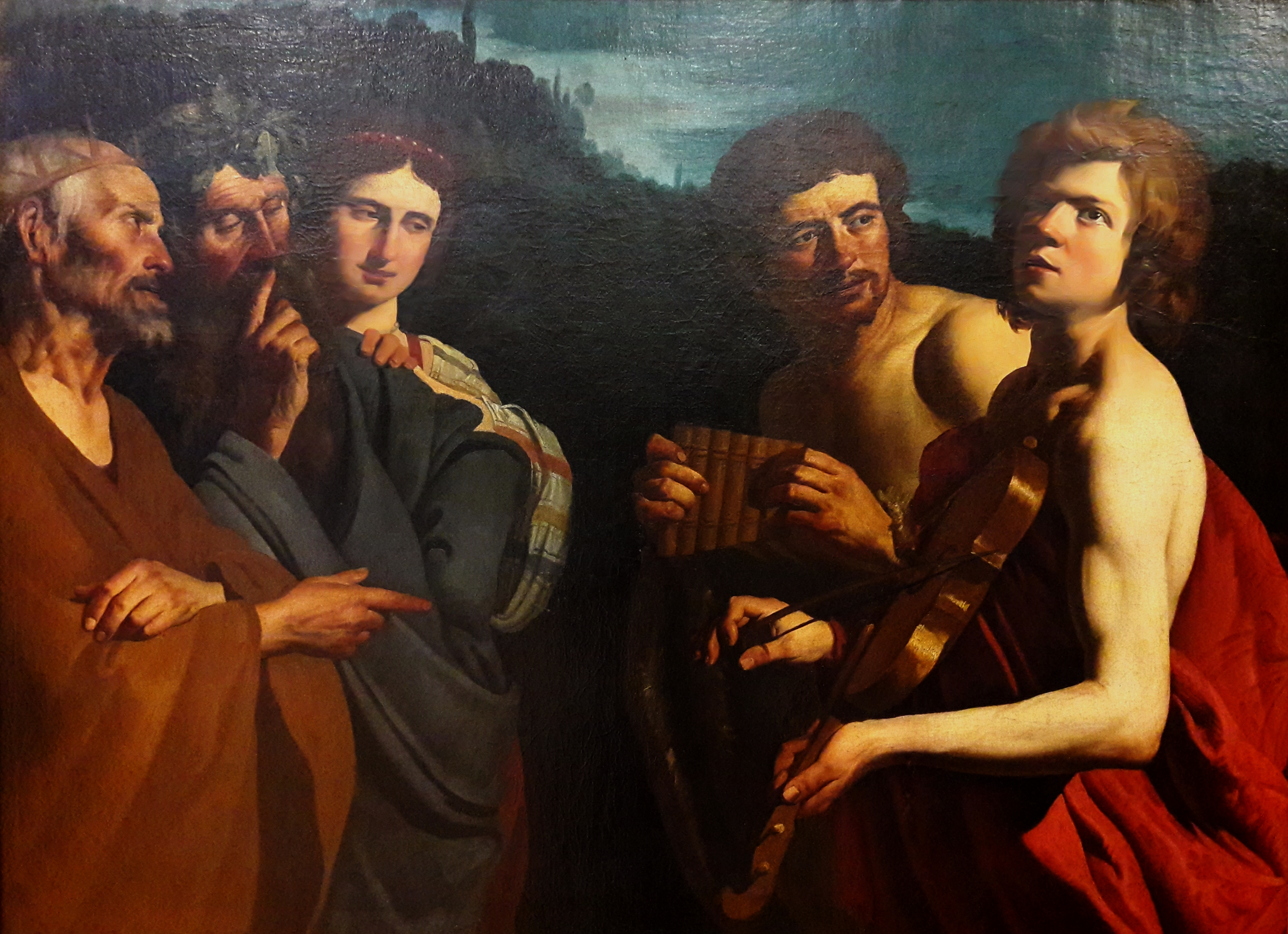
Judgment of Midas by Gerard van Honthorst

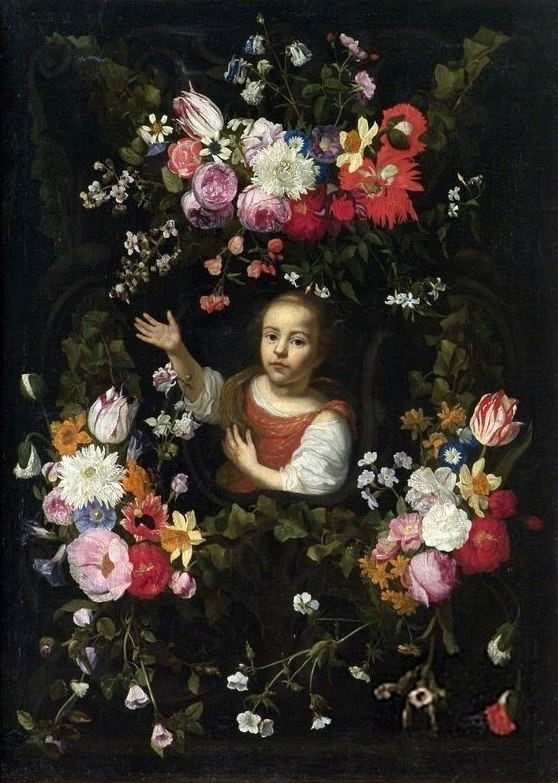
Girl in a garland of flowers, Jan Philip van Thielen

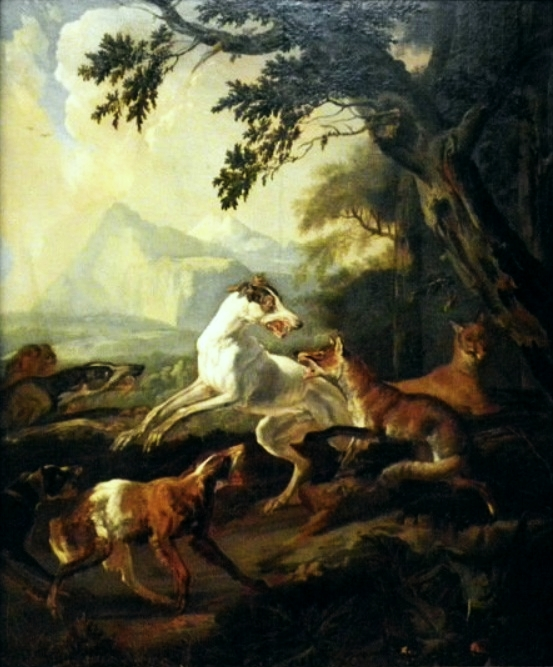
Dogs fighting with foxes, Abraham Hondius

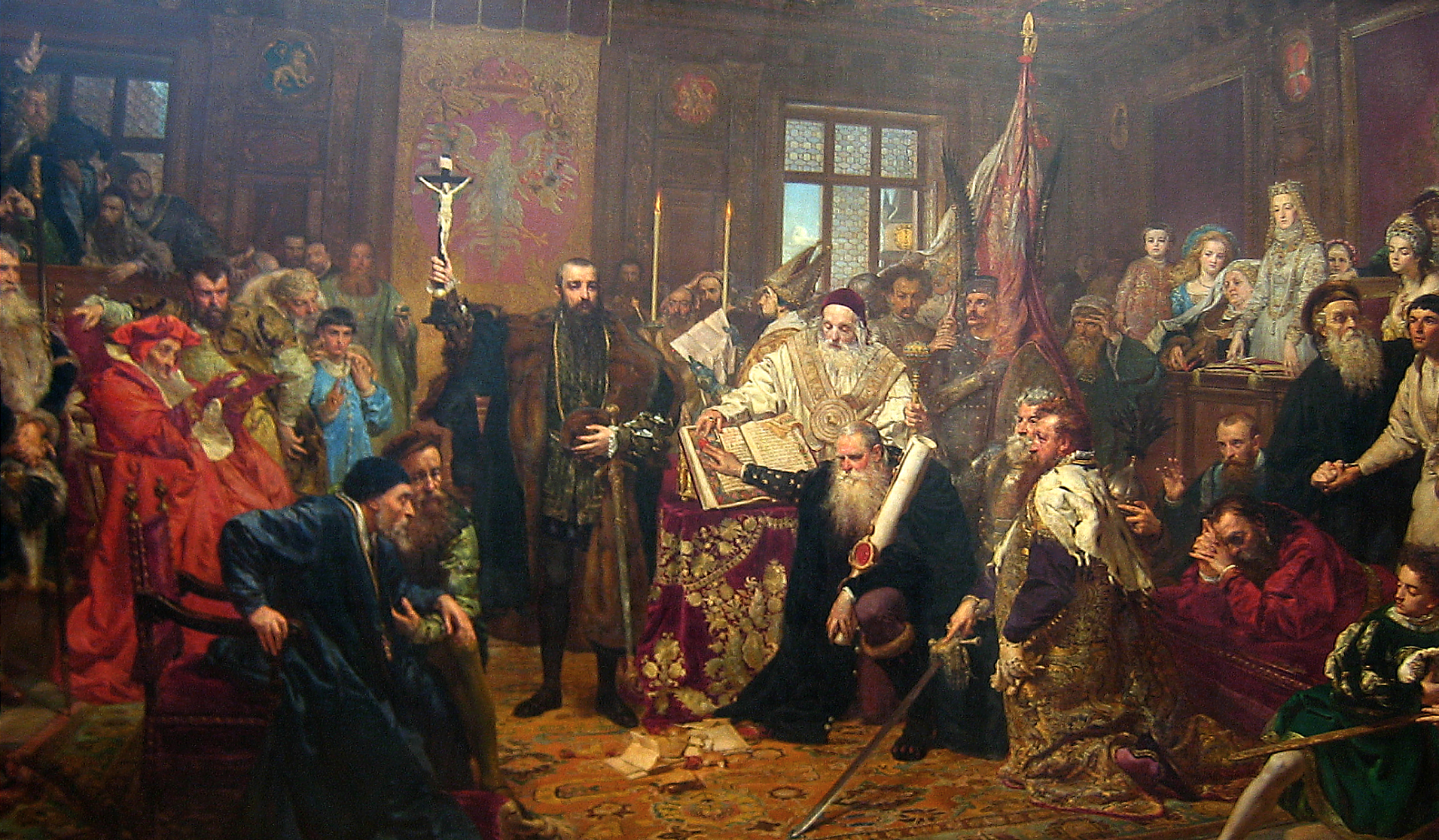
The Union of Lublin by Jan Matejko

== See also ==
- List of museums in Poland
