= Aneta Szyłak =

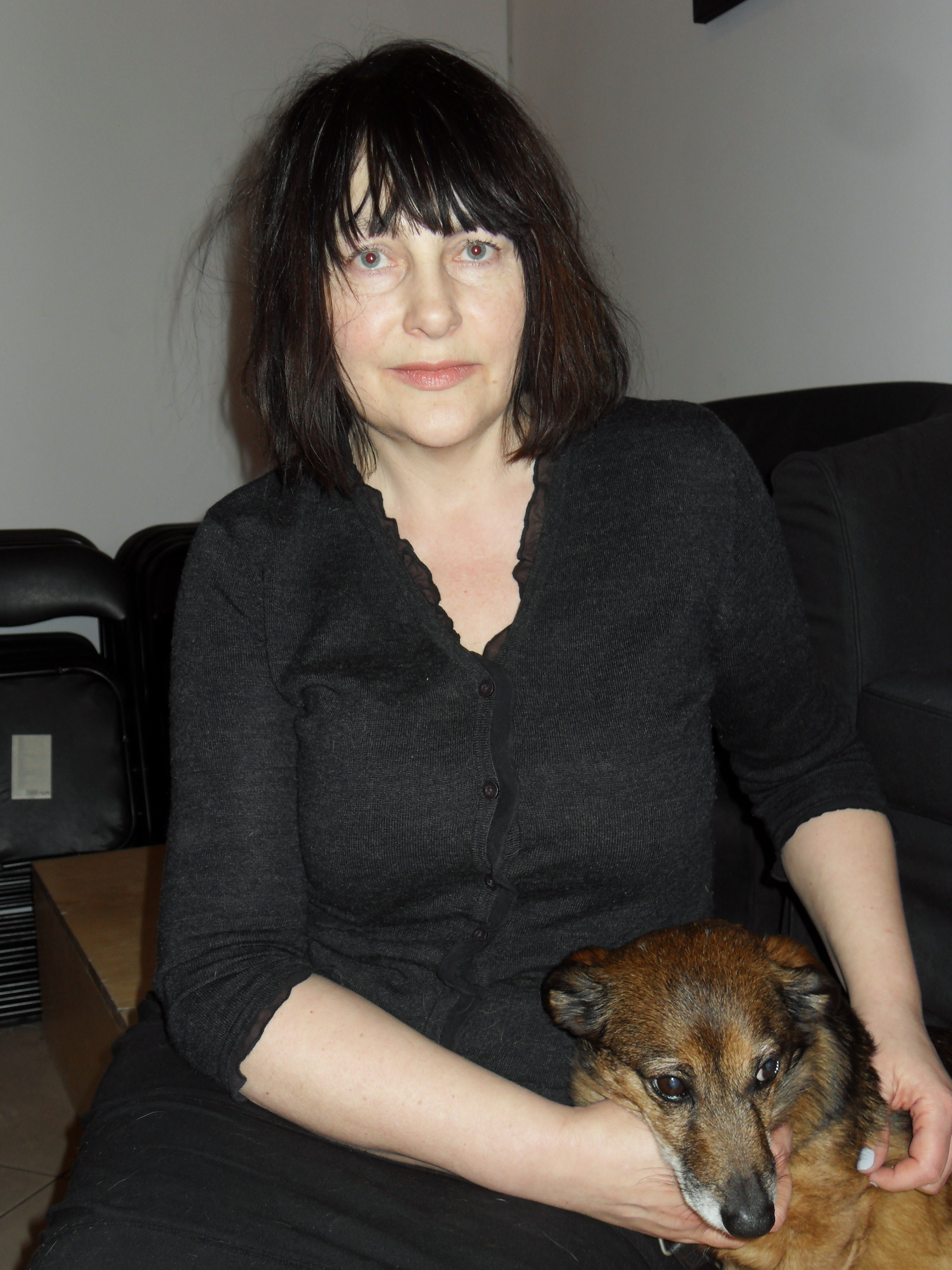
Image of Aneta Szyłak

Aneta Szyłak (born June 6, 1959 in Puck, Poland; died October 31, 2023) was a Polish art curator, art critic and art lecturer. She was the first director of the Łaźnia Center for Contemporary Art in Gdansk (1998-2001), founder and director of the Wyspa Institute of Art, organizer and first manager of Nomus - New Museum of Art. She curated exhibitions in Poland and abroad, animated the artistic life of Gdansk, and was the author or co-author of numerous publications on contemporary art.

== Work ==
She started her professional work in Puck, in the second half of the 1980s, organizing exhibitions of contemporary art in the halls of the Museum of the Puck Region. In 1998, together with Grzegorz Klaman, she founded the Łaznia Centre for Contemporary Art and was its Director until 2001. She was the director of the Wyspa Art Institute in Gdańsk (2004-2014) and vice-president of the Wyspa Progress Foundation.

Aneta Szyłak curated many exhibitions, including Architectures of Gender. Contemporary Women's Art in Poland at SculptureCenter in New York (2003), Palimpsest Muzeum during the Łódź Biennale at the Poznański Palace in Łódź, BHP at the Wyspa Institute of Art, Dialog Loci on the site of the former fortress in Kostrzyn nad Odrą (all in 2004), Dock Guards at the Wyspa Institute of Art (2005), Ewa Partum: Legality of Space at Wyspa and You won't feel a thing at Kunsthaus Dresden (2006).

Szyłak was instrumental in the creation and preparations for establishing the new museum Nomus, which opened in 2021 as the first museum in Gdańsk to house a permanent collection of contemporary art.

She founded an ran the Alternativa Foundation, which promotes artistic, research and curatorial work in the field of visual arts. She is the author of several dozen articles on contemporary art. She held the post of Vice-President of the Polish Section of the International Association of Art Critics AICA and the CIMAM.

She taught and lectured at colleges and universities including the New School, New York University, and Queens College in New York; Florida Atlantic University; Goldsmiths, University of London; Copenhagen University; the Dutch Art Institute, Arnhem; the Art History Department, Jagiellonian University. She served as a guest professor at the Akademie für Bildende Künst in Mainz, Germany.

== Awards ==
She received the Jerzy Stajuda Art Critics Award in 2004 for "independent and uncompromising curatorial practice" and her Architectures of Gender exhibition. In 2008 and 2015, she was the winner of the Award of the Mayor of Gdańsk in the field of Culture.
