= Roman Dziadkiewicz =

Polish artist (born 1972)

- Born: 1972 (age 53–54); Opole

Roman Dziadkiewicz (born 1972) is an interdisciplinary artist who taught at the Academy of Fine Arts in Kraków.

== Biography ==
He was born in Opole. He studied at the Pedagogical Academy in Opole and at the Faculty of Painting of the Academy of Fine Arts in Kraków, where he obtained his diploma in 1997 in the studio of Stanisław Rodziński. In 2011 he obtained doctorate under the supervision of Artur Tajber. From 2012 to 2025 he taught at the Academy of Fine Arts in Kraków.

He created poetry, painitng, videos, objects and installations; and authored critical and theoretical texts. His works shown at several exhibitions, including at the Bunkier Sztuki, Łaźnia Centre for Contemporary Art and Westfälischer Kunstverein in Münster.

== Books ==
- Powierzchniologia. Fundacja Imago Mundi/F.A.I.T. 2015. Translated into English as Superficiology.
