= List of registered museums in Poland =

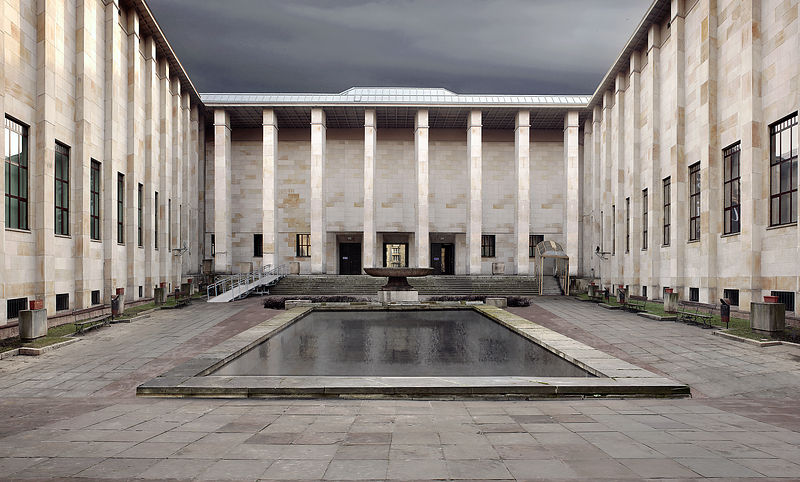
Courtyard of the National Museum of Warsaw, a registered museum

The Minister of Culture and National Heritage of Poland may inscribe a Polish museum into the National Register of Museums (Polish: Państwowy Rejestr Muzeów) in order to confirm the high level of its cultural activity and the importance of its collection. Only those museums that meet the required criteria – including importance of the museum's collection, a team of well qualified employees, an adequate building, and a permanent source of financing – may be entered into the register. Such museums are known as registered museums (muzea rejestrowane). A registered museum that no longer meets the criteria may be removed from the register.

Registered museums enjoy certain privileges that other museums in Poland do not. A registered museum has the right of pre-emption for artefacts offered for sale by antique traders and at auctions. Directors of registered museums elect triennially from among themselves eleven out of 21 members of the Museums Council (Rada do Spraw Muzeów), which advises the Minister of Culture and National Heritage on matters related to museums.

Among the 130 registered museums (as of 2021), the vast majority are state-owned. Sixteen of these are deemed to be of national importance and hence supervised directly by ministries of the national government – the Ministry of National Defence in the case of the Polish Army Museum and the Ministry of Culture and National Heritage for all the remaining ones. The rest of the state-owned museums are either under the supervision of local authorities of various levels (voivodeships, counties or communes) or are supervised jointly by a government ministry and local authorities. Additionally, one registered museum belongs to a state-owned university (the Jagiellonian University Museum) and one is privately owned (the Private Automotive and Technological Museum in Otrębusy).

Warsaw, the capital and largest city of Poland, has the highest concentration of registered museums, numbering sixteen. It is followed by Kraków, with nine registered museums; Gdańsk, which is home to four registered museums; and further by Lublin, Łódź and Opole, with three each.

== Registered museums ==
Source: Department of Cultural Heritage
#	English name	Polish name	Location	Owner or supervising body
1	Warsaw Royal Castle – Monument to National History and Culture	Zamek Królewski w Warszawie – Pomnik Historii i Kultury Narodowej	Warsaw	Ministry of Culture and National Heritage
2	National Museum in Kraków	Muzeum Narodowe w Krakowie	Kraków	Ministry of Culture and National Heritage
3	Zamoyski Family Museum (Kozłówka Palace)	Muzeum Zamoyskich	Kozłówka	Lublin Voivodeship
4	Kraków Saltworks Museum	Muzeum Żup Krakowskich	Wieliczka	Ministry of Culture and National Heritage
5	Museum of the Polish Peasant Movement	Muzeum Historii Polskiego Ruchu Ludowego	Warsaw	Masovian Voivodeship
7	Museum of Independence	Muzeum Niepodległości	Warsaw	Masovian Voivodeship
8	Museum of Polish Arms	Muzeum Oręża Polskiego	Kołobrzeg	Kołobrzeg County
9	Museum of the Lubusz Region	Muzeum Ziemi Lubuskiej	Zielona Góra	Lubusz Voivodeship
10	State Museum of Archaeology	Państwowe Muzeum Archeologiczne w Warszawie	Warsaw	Masovian Voivodeship
11	District Museum in Rzeszów	Muzeum Okręgowe w Rzeszowie	Rzeszów	Subcarpathian Voivodeship
12	National Museum in Warsaw	Muzeum Narodowe w Warszawie	Warsaw	Ministry of Culture and National Heritage
13	National Museum of Ethnography	Państwowe Muzeum Etnograficzne w Warszawie	Warsaw	Masovian Voivodeship
14	Majdanek State Museum	Państwowe Muzeum na Majdanku	Lublin	Ministry of Culture and National Heritage
15	Gross-Rosen Museum	Muzeum Gross-Rosen	Rogoźnica	Lower Silesian Voivodeship
16	Wawel Royal Castle National Art Collection	Zamek Królewski na Wawelu – Państwowe Zbiory Sztuki w Krakowie	Kraków	Ministry of Culture and National Heritage
17	Malbork Castle	Muzeum Zamkowe w Malborku	Malbork	Ministry of Culture and National Heritage
19	Pszczyna Castle	Muzeum Zamkowe w Pszczynie	Pszczyna	Silesian Voivodeship
20	Archaeological Museum of the Middle Odra Region	Muzeum Archeologiczne Środkowego Nadodrza	Świdnica	Zielona Góra County
21	Ethnographic Museum of Zielona Góra	Muzeum Etnograficzne w Zielonej Górze	Ochla	Lubusz Voivodeship
22	Lubusz Military Museum	Lubuskie Muzeum Wojskowe	Drzonów	Zielona Góra County
23	Museum of Middle Pomerania	Muzeum Pomorza Środkowego	Słupsk	Pomeranian Voivodeship
24	Central Museum of Prisoners-of-War (Łambinowice)	Centralne Muzeum Jeńców Wojennych	Opole	Opole Voivodeship
25	Auschwitz-Birkenau State Museum	Państwowe Muzeum Auschwitz-Birkenau	Oświęcim	Ministry of Culture and National Heritage
26	Museum of the Origins of the Polish State	Muzeum Początków Państwa Polskiego	Gniezno	Greater Poland Voivodeship
27	Górka Family Castle in Szamotuły	Zamek Górków w Szamotułach	Szamotuły	Szamotuły County
28	Museum of the Kuyavia and Dobrzyń Region	Muzeum Ziemi Kujawskiej i Dobrzyńskiej	Włocławek	Kuyavian-Pomeranian Voivodeship
29	King John III Palace Museum	Pałac w Wilanowie	Warsaw	Ministry of Culture and National Heritage
30	Stutthof Museum	Muzeum Stutthof	Sztutowo	Ministry of Culture and National Heritage
31	National Museum of Agriculture	Muzeum Narodowe Rolnictwa i Przemysłu Rolno-Spożywczego	Szreniawa	Ministry of Agriculture and Rural Development and Greater Poland Voivodeship
33	Museum of Sports and Tourism	Muzeum Sportu i Turystyki	Warsaw	Masovian Voivodeship
34	District Museum in Toruń	Muzeum Okręgowe w Toruniu	Toruń	City of Toruń
35	Museum of Southern Podlachia	Muzeum Południowego Podlasia	Biała Podlaska	City of Biała Podlaska
36	Giant Mountains Museum	Muzeum Karkonoskie	Jelenia Góra	Lower Silesian Voivodeship
37	Vistula Region Museum	Muzeum Nadwiślańskie	Kazimierz Dolny	Lublin Voivodeship and the city of Puławy
38	District Museum of the Kalisz Region	Muzeum Okręgowe Ziemi Kaliskiej	Kalisz	Greater Poland Voivodeship
39	Chełm Region Museum	Muzeum Ziemi Chełmskiej	Chełm	City of Chełm
40	Międzyrzecz Region Museum	Muzeum Ziemi Międzyrzeckiej	Międzyrzecz	Międzyrzecz County
41	Lubusz Region Museum	Muzeum Lubuskie	Gorzów Wielkopolski	Lubusz Voivodeship
42	Masovian Gentry Museum	Muzeum Szlachty Mazowieckiej	Ciechanów	Masovian Voivodeship
43	Museum of Agriculture	Muzeum Rolnictwa	Ciechanowiec	Podlaskie Voivodeship
44	Archaeological and Ethnographic Museum	Muzeum Archeologiczne i Etnograficzne	Łódź	Łódź Voivodeship
45	Industrial History Museum	Muzeum Historii Przemysłu	Opatówek	Kalisz County
46	District Museum in Piła	Muzeum Okręgowe w Pile	Piła	Greater Poland Voivodeship
47	Archaeological Museum in Poznań	Muzeum Archeologiczne w Poznaniu	Poznań	City of Poznań
48	Łańcut Castle	Zamek w Łańcucie	Łańcut	Ministry of Culture and National Heritage and Subcarpathian Voivodeship
49	National Museum in Lublin	Muzeum Narodowe w Lublinie	Lublin	Ministry of Culture and National Heritage and Lublin Voivodeship
50	Museum of Opole Silesia	Muzeum Śląska Opolskiego	Opole	Opole Voivodeship
51	Museum of Opole Countryside	Muzeum Wsi Opolskiej	Opole	Opole Voivodeship
52	Asia and Pacific Museum	Muzeum Azji i Pacyfiku	Warsaw	Masovian Voivodeship
53	Museum of Art in Łódź	Muzeum Sztuki w Łodzi	Łódź	Ministry of Culture and National Heritage and Łódź Voivodeship
54	Museum of the First Piasts on the Lednica Lake	Muzeum Pierwszych Piastów na Lednicy	Lednogóra	Greater Poland Voivodeship
55	Władysław Łęga Museum	Muzeum im. ks. dr. Władysława Łęgi	Grudziądz	City of Grudziądz
56	Museum of Kielce Countryside	Muzeum Wsi Kieleckiej	Kielce	Ministry of Agriculture and Rural Development and Holy Cross Voivodeship
57	National Maritime Museum	Narodowe Muzeum Morskie	Gdańsk	Ministry of Culture and National Heritage
58	Polish Army Museum	Muzeum Wojska Polskiego	Warsaw	Ministry of National Defence
59	Museum of Folk Musical Instruments	Muzeum Ludowych Instrumentów Muzycznych	Szydłowiec	Masovian Voivodeship
60	Museum of Łowicz	Muzeum w Łowiczu	Łowicz	Łowicz County
61	Sandomierz Castle	Muzeum Zamkowe w Sandomierzu	Sandomierz	Holy Cross Voivodeship, Sandomierz County, and the town of Sandomierz
63	Museum of Literature	Muzeum Literatury	Warsaw	Ministry of Culture and National Heritage and Masovian Voivodeship
64	Museum of Western Masovia	Muzeum Mazowsza Zachodniego	Żyrardów	Żyrardów County
65	Kashubian Museum	Muzeum Kaszubskie	Kartuzy	Kartuzy Commune
66	Museum of Warsaw	Muzeum Warszawy	Warsaw	City of Warsaw
67	Lublin Open Air Village Museum	Muzeum Wsi Lubelskiej	Lublin	Ministry of Agriculture and Rural Development and Lublin Voivodeship
68	Historical and Archaeological Museum in Ostrowiec Świętokrzyski	Muzeum Historyczno-Archeologiczne w Ostrowcu Świętokrzyskim	Ostrowiec Świętokrzyski	Ostrowiec Świętokrzyski County
69	Museum of the Kłodzko Region	Muzeum Ziemi Kłodzkiej	Kłodzko	Town of Kłodzko
70	Private Automotive and Technological Museum	Prywatne Muzeum Motoryzacji i Techniki	Otrębusy	Mikiciuk Family
71	Kashubian Ethnographic Park	Kaszubski Park Etnograficzny	Wdzydze Kiszewskie	Pomeranian Voivodeship
72	District Museum in Tarnów	Muzeum Okręgowe w Tarnowie	Tarnów	Lesser Poland Voivodeship
73	Museum of Porcelain	Muzeum Porcelany	Wałbrzych	City of Wałbrzych
74	Podlachian Museum	Muzeum Podlaskie w Białymstoku	Białystok	Podlaskie Voivodeship
75	Subcarpathian Museum	Muzeum Podkarpackie	Krosno	Subcarpathian Voivodeship
76	National Museum of Gdańsk	Muzeum Narodowe w Gdańsku	Gdańsk	Ministry of Culture and National Heritage and Pomeranian Voivodeship
77	Museum of the Wieluń Region	Muzeum Ziemi Wieluńskiej	Wieluń	Wieluń Commune
78	Zofia and Wacław Nałkowski Museum	Muzeum im. Zofii i Wacława Nałkowskich	Wołomin	Wołomin Commune
79	Masovian Museum	Muzeum Mazowieckie	Płock	Masovian Voivodeship
80	National Museum of Poznań	Muzeum Narodowe w Poznaniu	Poznań	Ministry of Culture and National Heritage
81	Warsaw Uprising Museum	Muzeum Powstania Warszawskiego	Warsaw	City of Warsaw
82	Ethnographic Museum of Toruń	Muzeum Etnograficzne w Toruniu	Toruń	Kuyavian-Pomeranian Voivodeship
83	Regional Museum of Stalowa Wola	Muzeum Regionalne w Stalowej Woli	Stalowa Wola	City of Stalowa Wola
84	Historical Museum of the City of Kraków	Muzeum Historyczne Miasta Krakowa	Kraków	City of Kraków
85	Rural Architecture Museum of Sanok	Muzeum Budownictwa Ludowego w Sanoku	Sanok	Subcarpathian Voivodeship
86	Silesian Museum	Muzeum Śląskie	Katowice	Ministry of Culture and National Heritage and Silesian Voivodeship
87	Museum of the Puck Region	Muzeum Ziemi Puckiej	Puck	Puck County
88	Museum of Kashubian and Pomeranian Writing and Music	Muzeum Piśmiennictwa i Muzyki Kaszubsko-Pomorskiej	Wejherowo	Wejherowo County
89	Museum of Warmia and Masuria	Muzeum Warmii i Mazur	Olsztyn	Warmian-Masurian Voivodeship
90	Archaeological Museum of Kraków	Muzeum Archeologiczne w Krakowie	Kraków	Lesser Poland Voivodeship
91	Polish Aviation Museum	Muzeum Lotnictwa Polskiego	Kraków	Lesser Poland Voivodeship
92	Regional of the Sącz Region	Muzeum Ziemi Sądeckiej	Nowy Sącz	Lesser Poland Voivodeship
93	Tatra Museum	Muzeum Tatrzańskie	Zakopane	Lesser Poland Voivodeship
94	Ethnographic Museum of Kraków	Muzeum Etnograficzne w Krakowie	Kraków	Lesser Poland Voivodeship
95	Oporów Castle	Zamek w Oporowie	Oporów	Kutno County
96	National Museum of the Przemyśl Region	Muzeum Narodowe Ziemi Przemyskiej	Przemyśl	Subcarpathian Voivodeship
97	Archaeological and Historical Museum of Głogów	Muzeum Archeologiczno-Historyczne w Głogowie	Głogów	City of Głogów
98	District Museum in Leszno	Muzeum Okręgowe w Lesznie	Leszno	Greater Poland Voivodeship
99	Rural Architecture Museum and Ethnographic Park of Olsztynek	Muzeum Budownictwa Ludowego – Park Etnograficzny w Olsztynku	Olsztynek	Warmian-Masurian Voivodeship
100	Museum of Koszalin	Muzeum w Koszalinie	Koszalin	City of Koszalin
101	District Museum in Bydgoszcz	Muzeum Okręgowe w Bydgoszczy	Bydgoszcz	City of Bydgoszcz
102	Nicolaus Copernicus Museum	Muzeum Mikołaja Kopernika	Frombork	Warmian-Masurian Voivodeship
103	Rural Culture Museum of Kolbuszowa	Muzeum Kultury Ludowej w Kolbuszowej	Kolbuszowa	Subcarpathian Voivodeship
104	Museum of Western Lesser Poland	Muzeum Małopolski Zachodniej	Wygiełzów	Lesser Poland Voivodeship and Chrzanów Commune
105	National Museum of Szczecin	Muzeum Narodowe w Szczecinie	Szczecin	Ministry of Culture and National Heritage and West Pomeranian Voivodeship
106	Oravian Ethnographic Park	Orawski Park Etnograficzny	Zubrzyca Górna	Lesser Poland Voivodeship
107	Historical and Ethnographic Museum of Chojnice	Muzeum Historyczno-Etnograficzne w Chojnicach	Chojnice	Chojnice County
109	Museum of Northern Masovia	Muzeum Północno-Mazowieckie	Łomża	City of Łomża
110	Jagiellonian University Museum	Muzeum Uniwersytetu Jagiellońskiego	Kraków	Jagiellonian University
111	West Kashubian Museum	Muzeum Zachodnio-Kaszubskie	Bytów	Pomeranian Voivodeship
112	Rural Culture Museum of Węgorzewo	Muzeum Kultury Ludowej w Węgorzewie	Węgorzewo	Warmian-Masurian Voivodeship
113	National Museum of Wrocław	Muzeum Narodowe w Wrocławiu	Wrocław	Ministry of Culture and National Heritage and Lower Silesian Voivodeship
114	Museum of Zamość	Muzeum Zamojskie	Zamość	City of Zamość
115	Museum of Papermaking	Muzeum Papiernictwa w Dusznikach Zdroju	Duszniki-Zdrój	Lower Silesian Voivodeship
116	Central Museum of Textiles	Centralne Muzeum Włókiennictwa w Łodzi	Łódź	City of Łódź
117	Museum of Architecture	Muzeum Architektury we Wrocławiu	Wrocław	City of Wrocław
118	Manggha Museum of Japanese Art and Technology	Muzeum Sztuki i Techniki Japońskiej Manggha	Kraków	Ministry of Culture and National Heritage
119	Museum of Masovian Countryside	Muzeum Wsi Mazowieckiej w Sierpcu	Sierpc	Masovian Voivodeship
120	Walery Rzewuski Museum of the History of Photography	Muzeum Historii Fotografii im. Walerego Rzewuskiego w Krakowie	Kraków	City of Kraków
121	District Museum in Suwałki	Muzeum Okręgowe w Suwałkach	Suwałki	City of Suwałki
122	Museum of Gdańsk	Muzeum Gdańska	Gdańsk	City of Gdańsk
123	Museum of Romanticism	Muzeum Romantyzmu w Opinogórze	Opinogóra Górna	Masovian Voivodeship
124	Historical Museum of Bielsko-Biała	Muzeum Historyczne w Bielsku-Białej	Bielsko-Biała	Silesian Voivodeship
125	Military Museum of Białystok	Muzeum Wojska w Białymstoku	Białystok	City of Białystok
126	Museum of Old Trade	Muzeum Dawnego Kupiectwa w Świdnicy	Świdnica	City of Świdnica
127	POLIN Museum of the History of Polish Jews	Muzeum Historii Żydów Polskich POLIN	Warsaw	Ministry of Culture and National Heritage, City of Warsaw, Jewish Historical Institute
128	Frédéric Chopin Museum	Muzeum Fryderyka Chopina w Warszawie	Warsaw	National Frédéric Chopin Institute
129	Upper Silesian Ethnographic Park	Górnośląski Park Etnograficzny w Chorzowie	Chorzów	Silesian Voivodeship
130	National Museum of Kielce	Muzeum Narodowe w Kielcach	Kielce	Ministry of Culture and National Heritage and Holy Cross Voivodeship
131	Museum of the Second World War	Muzeum II Wojny Światowej	Gdańsk	Ministry of Culture and National Heritage
132	Royal Baths Museum	Muzeum Łazienki Królewskie	Warsaw	Ministry of Culture and National Heritage
133	Museum of the City of Żory	Muzeum Miejskie w Żorach	Żory	City of Żory
134	Tarnowski Castle	Muzeum Zamek Tarnowskich w Tarnobrzegu	Tarnobrzeg	City of Tarnobrzeg
135	Museum of Upper Silesia	Muzeum Górnośląskie w Bytomiu	Bytom	Silesian Voivodeship

== Formerly registered museums ==
The following museums have been removed from the register.

Source: Department of Cultural Heritage
English name	Polish name	Location	Owner or supervising body	Notes
Museum of Hunting and Horsemanship	Muzeum Łowiectwa i Jeździectwa	Warsaw	Ministry of Culture and National Heritage	Merged into the Royal Baths Museum in 2019
Warsaw Railway Museum	Muzeum Kolejnictwa	Warsaw	Masovian Voivodeship	Disestablished and transformed into a new museum as Stacja Muzeum in 2016
