= Ryszard Wasko =

Polish artist (born 1947)

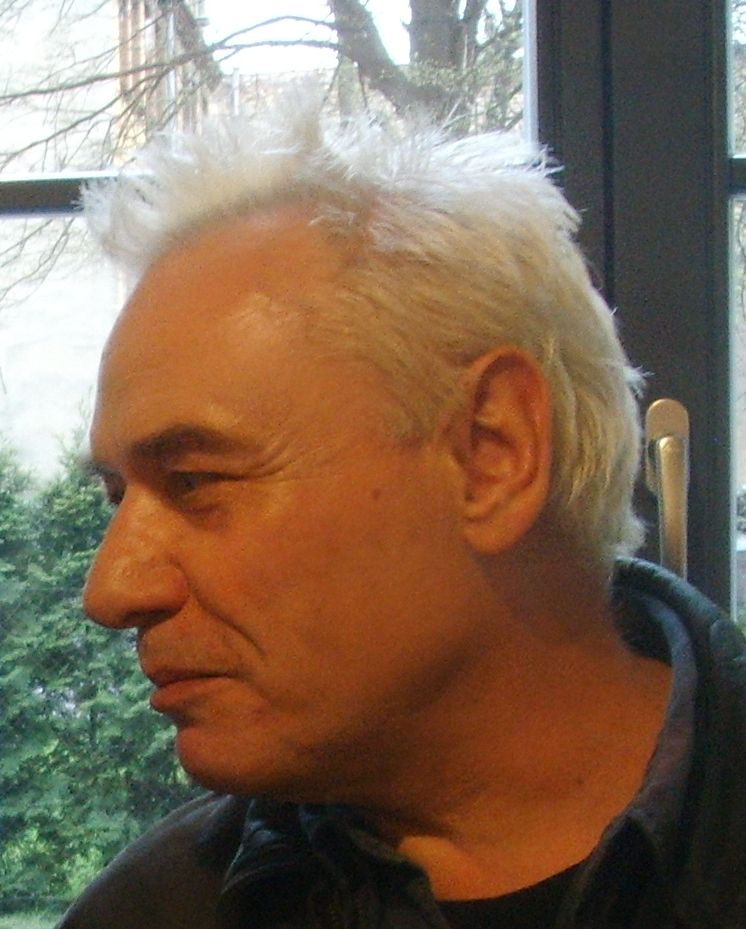
- Ryszard Wasko; 2006
- Born: February 21, 1947 (age 79); Nysa
- Education: National Film School in Łódź, Poland
- Known for: Painting, Encaustic painting, Oil painting, Pixel artist, Drawing, Installation, Sculpture, Assemblage, Environmental sculpture, Bricolage, Land art, Performance art, Happening, Photography, Digital photography, Film, Video art, Video installation
- Notable work: Cut up portrait (1971); Four-dimensional photography (1972); Time sculpture of black paint (1985); Man in the Night (to Barnett Newman) (1988); Meal for the Rich and the Poor (1993); 7 Paths of Roses (1995); Child Territories (1996); Small Rose Garden (1997); Bedtime Stories (2003); This image has been removed for security reasons. (2005); Tv Stories (2006); So what? (2006)
- Movement: Conceptualism, Experimental Film
- Awards: The Knight's Cross of The Order of Polonia Restituta (2007); Grand Prix at the Biennale of Polish photography in Szczecin, Poland (1972)
- Patrons: Meister Eckhart, Władysław Strzemiński

Ryszard Wasko (Waśko) (born February 21, 1947, in Nysa) is a Polish artist, who has worked in multimedia, including photography, film, video, installation, painting, and drawing. He is also known as a curator and organizer of art events. He lives and works in Berlin.

== Early life ==
=== Workshop of the Film Form (1970–1977) ===
He was born in Nysa. As a child he took painting-classes planning to become a painter and wanting to study at the Art Academy in Kraków. But instead of making his childhood dream come true, he made up his mind and went to Łódź, where he studied cinematography at the Film School between 1970 and 1975. During that time he became a member of Workshop of the Film Form, one of the most important artistic groups in Poland in the 70s. Workshop was an avant-garde collective of painters, filmmakers, critics, poets, philosophers and scientists, working with experimental film and multimedia. Later on Ryszard Wasko became a lecturer in the departments of experimental media and photography at the Film School in Lodz.

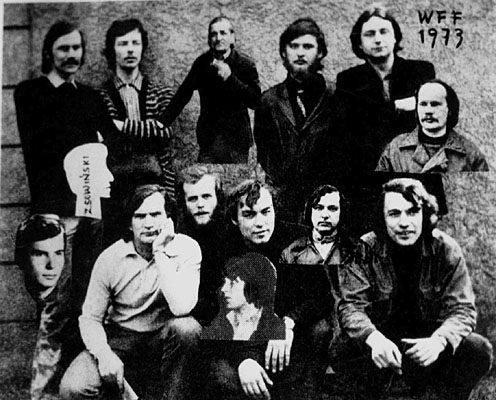
The members of the Workshop of the Film Form (1973)

=== First accomplishments ===
In the 70s he took part in the XII São Paulo Art Biennial, documenta 6, the Third International Festival of Independent Avant-garde Film in London, the Sydney Biennale, the XI Biennale de Paris, the V Biennale of Spatial Forms among others. He also created the Archives of Contemporary Thought (1979), a forum for symposia and art events.

=== Early works ===
After dealing with experimental film and photography, Wasko started to develop his painting skills again. "Wasko discovered himself as an artist and learned how to cope with everyday life with a greater vision of the world than simply the provincial circumstances of life. " He left the Workshop of the Film Form and came to prominence as a conceptual artist. "After studying film-making at the Academy in Lodz in the late sixties, Wasko went on to become one of Poland's leading conceptualists, working as a pioneer in the media of video and photography. Much of this work focused on dense mathematical structures involving sequences of time and reality." His artistic output should be actually seen as a connection of two main fields: photography&film and painting. "(...) the character of Ryszard Wasko's work in general, as well as the character of his individual works, is often defined by inter-generic, inter-media relations. Those works set in motion a whole net of intertextual relations on the level of general structural and ontological determinants, and on the level of different types of perception and rules of interpretation. In other words, in order to grasp a work which belongs to a certain artistic genre in its specificity, one should refer to its non-specific features which are characteristic for another kind of art."

== Construction in Process (1981) ==
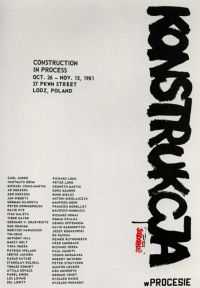
Construction in Process, poster from the exhibition held in Lodz

"It is impossible (...) to separate his activities as an artist (as a maker of installations, as a creator of paintings and works on paper) from his other endeavors as a curator, organizer, teacher, writer, agitator (...)."
In 1981 in Lodz, Wasko initiated and organized Construction in Process, a series of exhibitions featuring works of art created on site. "(...) it was an important, and in fact crucial, event in the Polish arts scene of that era." Artists who were invited to participate in Construction in Process invite in turn, another group of participants, giving the project a dynamic, open character. " The event became a symbolic alternative to larger institutional art events, including high-powered state and corporate-sponsored biennials and market-driven art fairs." The participating artists were Richard Serra, Sol LeWitt, Brian O'Doherty, Dennis Oppenheim, Lawrence Weiner, Richard Nonas and others. After the first event in 1981 The Solidarity Collection (which includes works by the artists created for that event) came into existence. "Wasko continued to produce international events into the nineties, including two additional projects in Lodz (1990 and 1993), one in Israel (1995), one in Australia (1997), and another,(...) in the small town of Bydgogosz in north central Poland (2000)." 2006, 25 years after the opening of the first exhibition, Wasko established the Construction in Process-Museum (also in Lodz). Unfortunately, a waterdamage forced him to close it down (2008) and to devolve the collection to the Muzeum Sztuki in Lodz.

== Exile (1983–1993) ==
=== Artistic career abroad ===
After Martial Law was brought on in Poland, Wasko decided to leave for Germany in 1983. There, he received a DAAD scholarship in Berlin among other residencies. In the '80s he improved as a painter. Besides numerous one-man shows, Wasko took part in several international exhibitions, e.g., at Centre Georges Pompidou, Kunsthalle Hamburg and the Venice Biennale (1991, 1999, 2001, 2007). At the same time he lectured extensively in Europe, including at Saint Martin's School of Art, Hochschule der Künste in Berlin and Freie Kunstakademie in Essen. The Pollock-Krasner Foundation has awarded Ryszard Wasko three times (1988,1993,1998).

=== The International Artists' Museum ===
Wasko went to Poland in 1989 and founded The International Artists' Museum in Lodz. It had developed into a worldwide network of locally run art centers, linking artists and intellectuals from diverse backgrounds, locations, and disciplines. It was " (...) an on-going alternative space that shows the work of international artists." The Museum has organized and sponsored over 60 major international events, exhibitions, meetings, panels, concerts, readings, and projects focusing on art, culture, borders, community, and identity. Due to political changes in the city government the building of the International Artist's Museum at Tylna Street 14 has been sold to a private Bank (1998). The artistic community was not able to gather the vast sum of money the city of Lodz wanted for the property. The beautiful sculpture garden has been destroyed by the new owners. Only the work of Sol LeWitt is still standing at its original place."His paradoxical brand of conceptual humanism has always been toward developing a better world and more spiritually-oriented environment for artists in which they can produce work outside of marketing restrictions, and thus communicate ideas that will benefit common people." Unfortunately, his ideas were never understood by the authorities.

=== Growing up and experimentalizing ===
"For many years, austere, yet gorgeous, works on paper have been a big part of Wasko's oeuvre." The drawings brought him to artpieces on canvas. In that time Wasko acted mainly as a painter. He started working with different materials lik soot, was, fat, zinc, fire, and others. "(...) the most important modification was the use of different materials than before. (...) Wasko turned to the simplest, 'poor' means of natural origin."

== Łódź (1993–2008) ==
=== Curator, director, teacher ===
Between 1990 and 1992 Wasko became Program Director at the P.S.1 Museum and Institute of Contemporary Art (today called P.S.1 Contemporary Art Center) in New York City and in 1997 he was chosen President of the International Artists Forum (IKG). At the same time he still handled the International Artist's Museum in Lodz. That town became Wasko's new home for over 15 years. The Valand School of Fine Arts in Gothenburg invited him to give lectures as a Professor for two semesters (2004–2005).
His artwork has been shown mostly in Europe (e.g. Tate Modern Gallery) and the United States (e.g. The Museum of Modern Art in New York).

=== Lodz Biennale ===
In 2004 Wasko amplified a new idea: the Łódź Biennale, to be the first international Biennale in Eastern Europe.

=== Exploring new territories ===
Being successful as a director and curator he managed also to work creatively as an artist. In the 90s he worked mostly with primary painting materials like soot. He explored also the field of performance (Meal for the Rich & Poor, 1993) and installation (Child Territories, 1996). Around 2000 Wasko made his turn back to film and photography, but one should not think, he is an artist, who jumps from media to media, from material to material. His is an intermedial artist: "Wasko's works are not limited to any of the artistic genres he uses because they easily cross the borders between them: And his individual realizations, even if they remain - due to the materials used and some general genre manifestations - within a certain kind of art, they still cannot be explained by referring to the characteristics of that branch of art which is realized in them. On the contrary, quite often the fundamental principles which make up the structure of the artefacts come from a different branch of art than the one in which the works were actually created and where we would be inclined to place them."

== Back in Berlin (2008) ==
In 2007, together with his wife Maria Wasko, he decided to move back to Berlin. They have lived there since 2008. Recent solo exhibitions include a retrospection at the Museum of History of the City of Lodz (Ryszard Wasko, Lodz – Berlin, works 1971–1996) in 2008 and at the Haus am Lützowplatz in Berlin (Contemporary Portrait, Checkpoint Charlie Hypothetical) in 2009.

"The entire trajectory of Ryszard Wasko's career has comprised a substantial, in many ways risk-taking and innovative, extension and enlargement of the role of the artist. (...) He is, in fact, one of those figures who consistently shakes things up and pushes the borders of the possible, certainly with a sense of mission, but also with humor and verve."

== Gallery ==
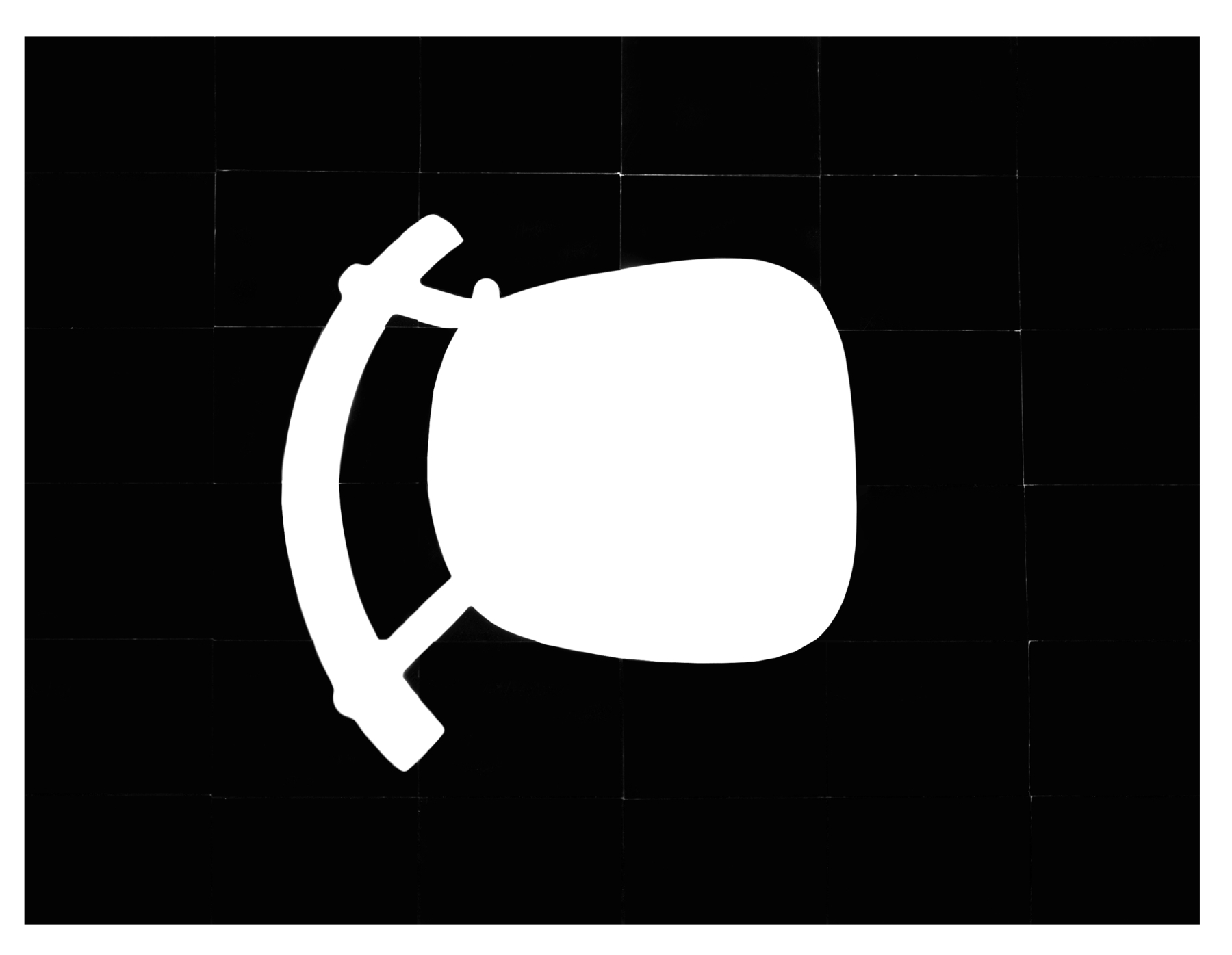
Chair I (1971)
photography

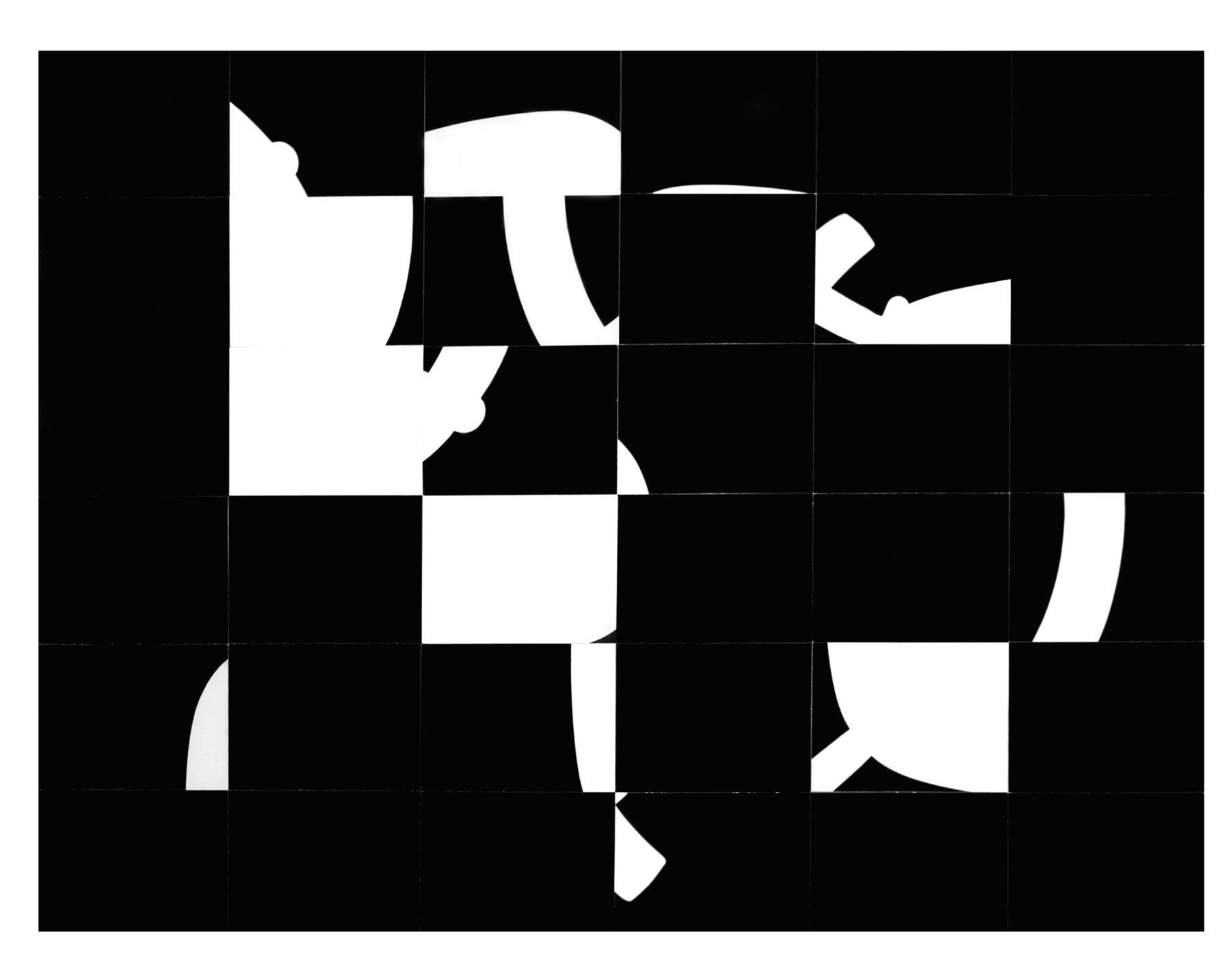
Chair II (1971)
photography

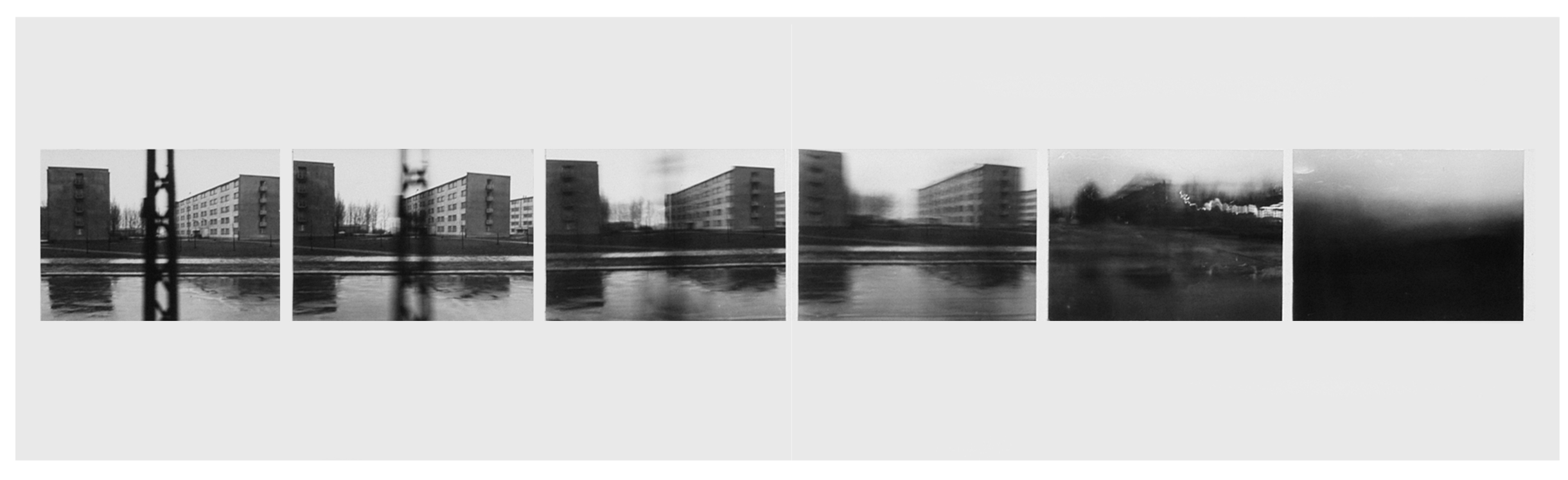
Four-dimensional photography II (1972)
photography

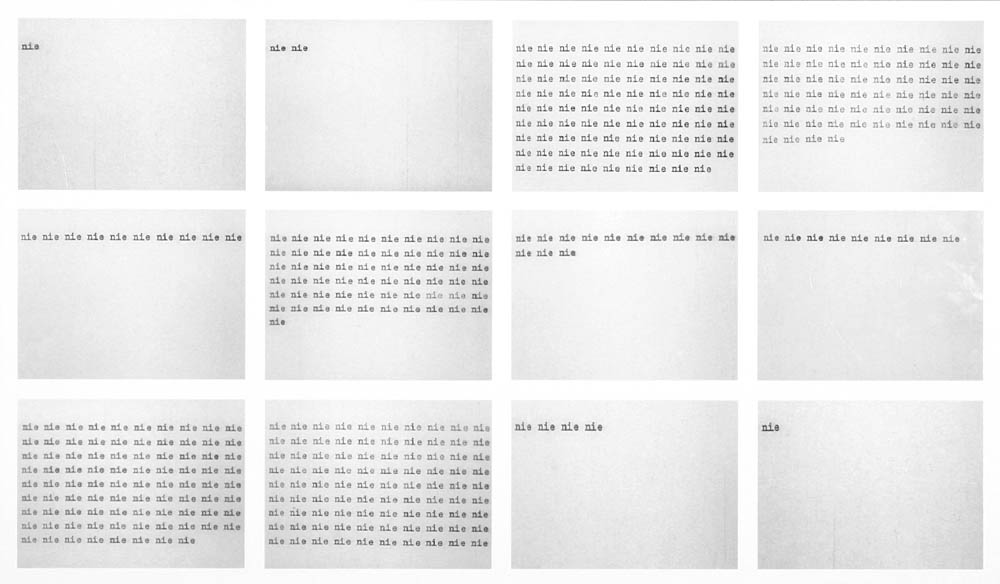
Negation (1973)
stills from the film

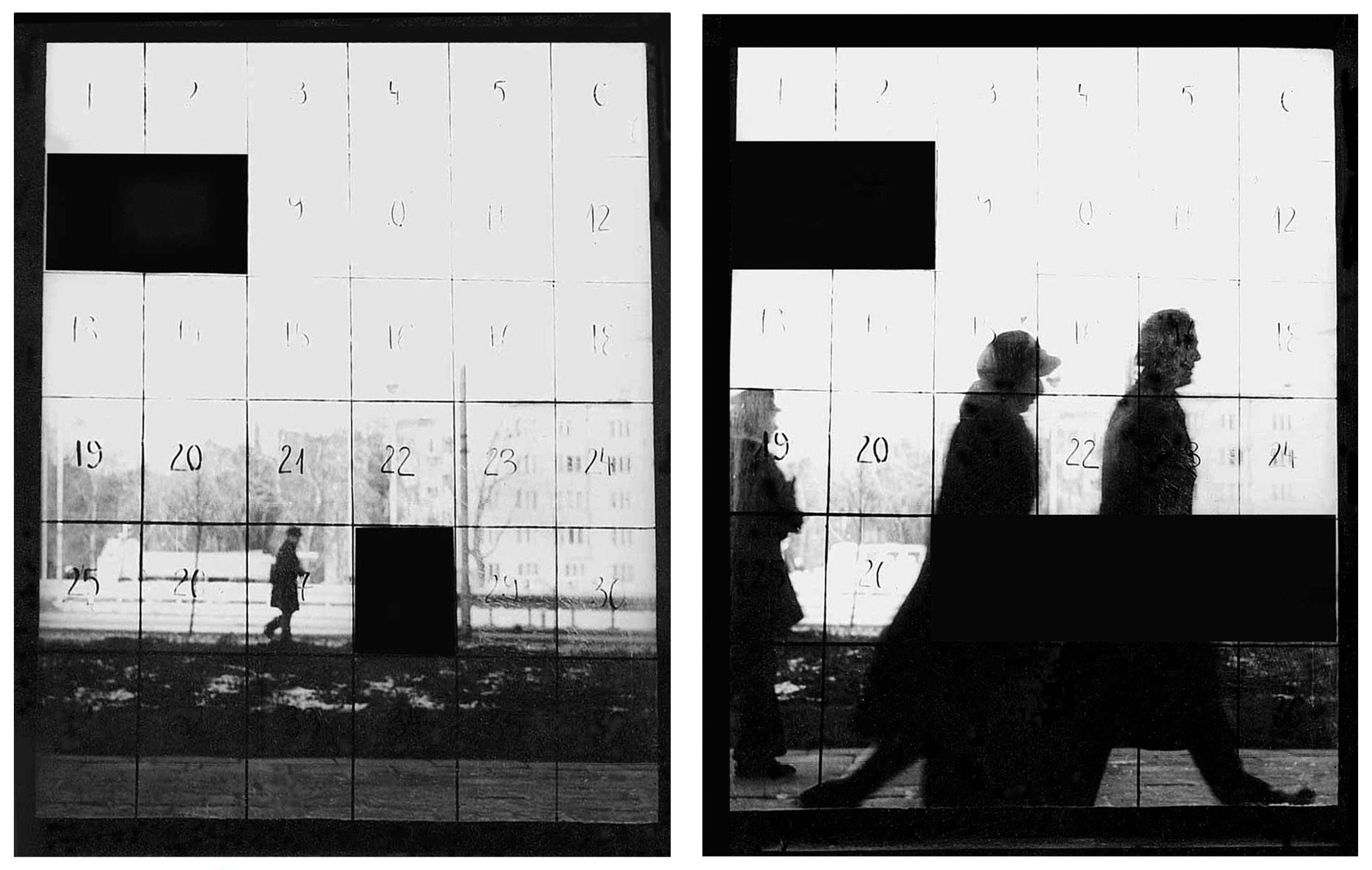
Event on pane (1975)
happening at Remont Gallery, Warsaw, Poland

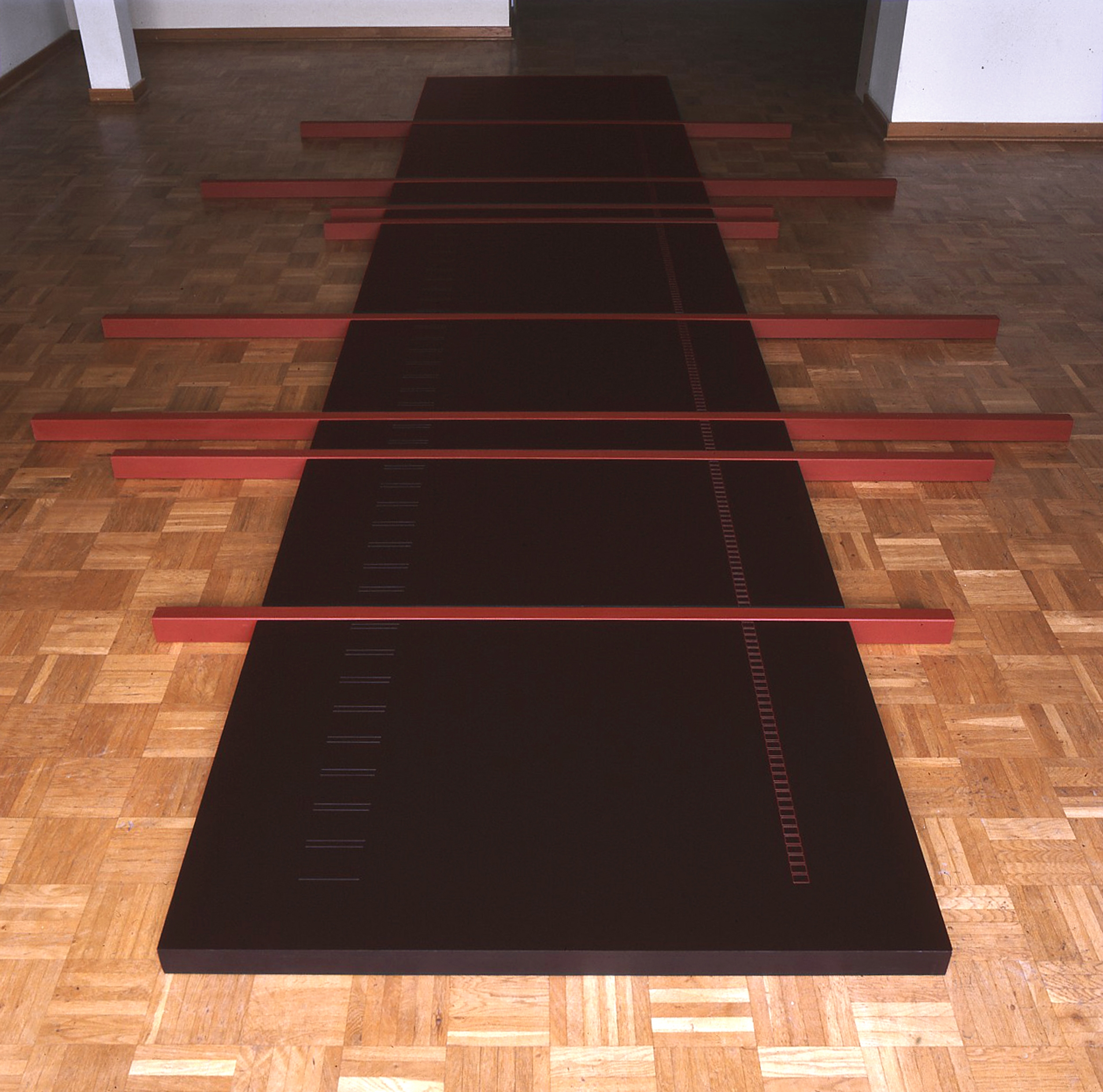
Discontinuous Sculpture (1985)
acrylic on wood

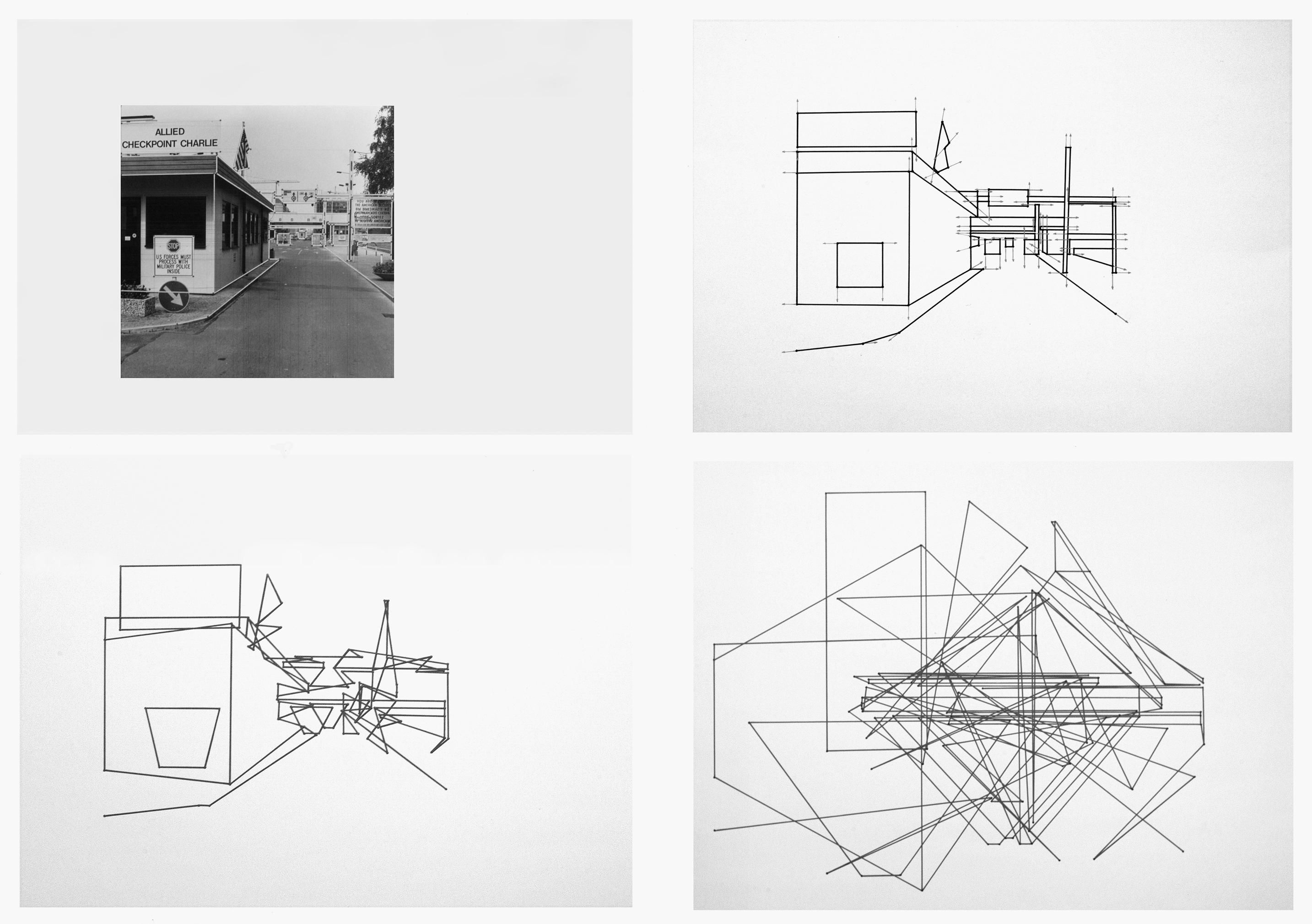
Hypothetical Checkpoint Charlie (1988)
acrylic on photo and board

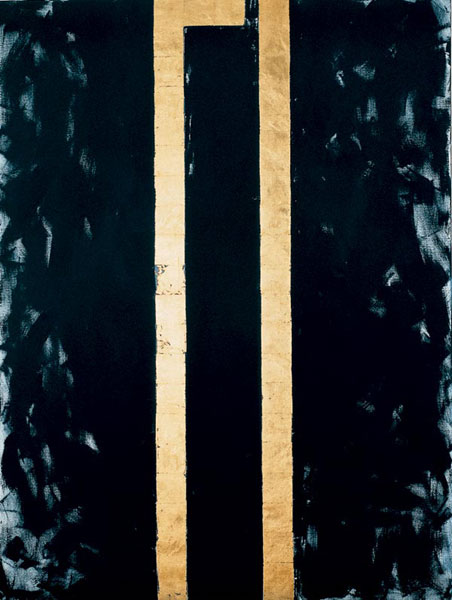
Man in the Night (1988)
painting
(soot, gold leaf, oil on canvas)
dedicated to Barnett Newman

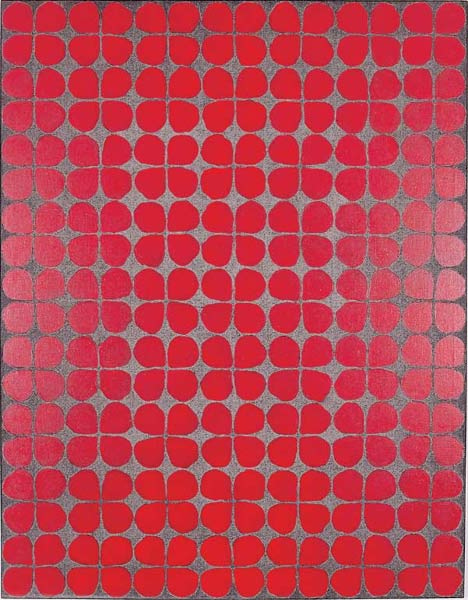
Small Rose Garden (1993)
painting
(oil and pencil on canvas)

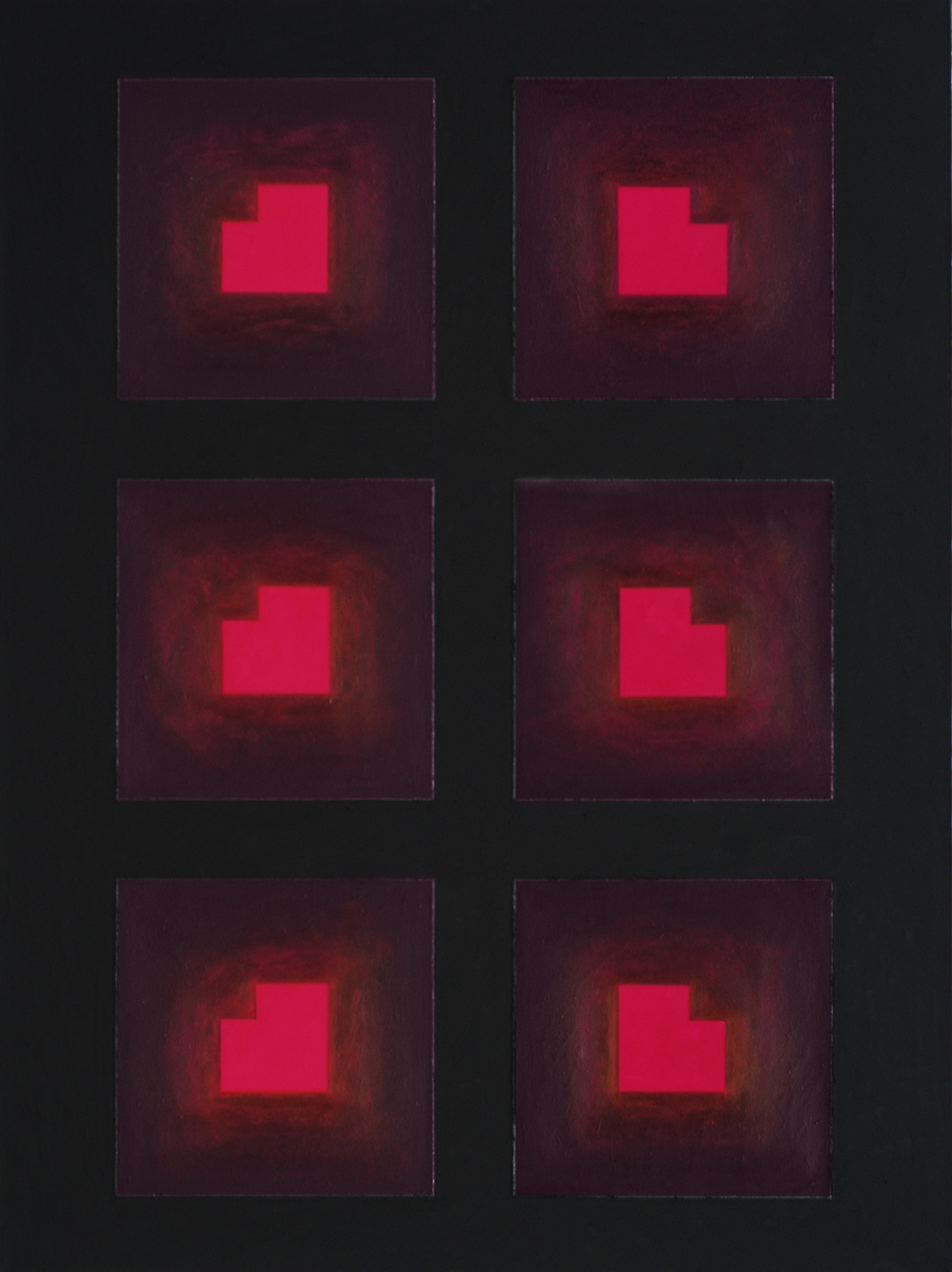
Red Rock at Dawn (1994)
painting
(soot and pigment on canvas)

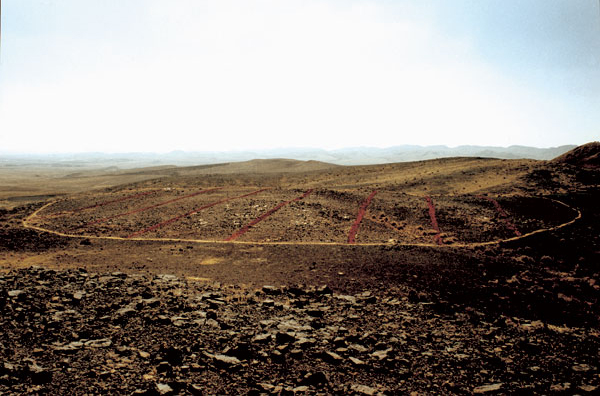
7 Paths of Roses (1995)
sand painting
Negev Desert, Israel
work for Construction in Process V

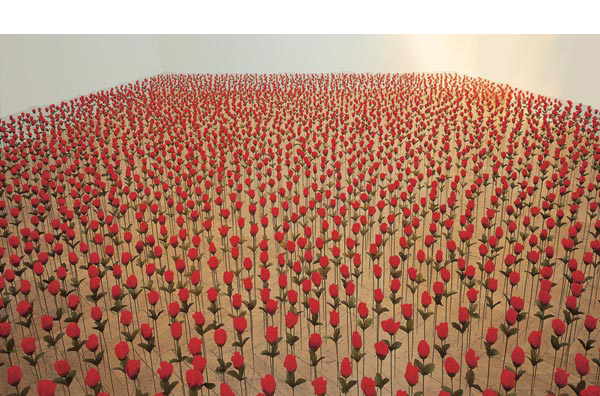
Small Rose Garden (1997)
installation with 4000 plastic roses
at the Zacheta Gallery
in Warsaw, Poland

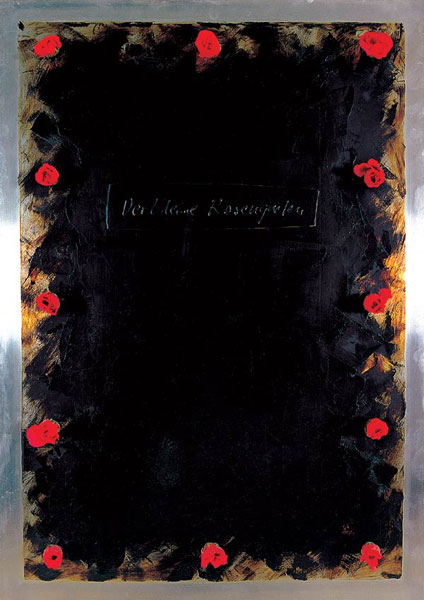
Small Rose Garden (1997)
plastic roses and pitch on steel plate

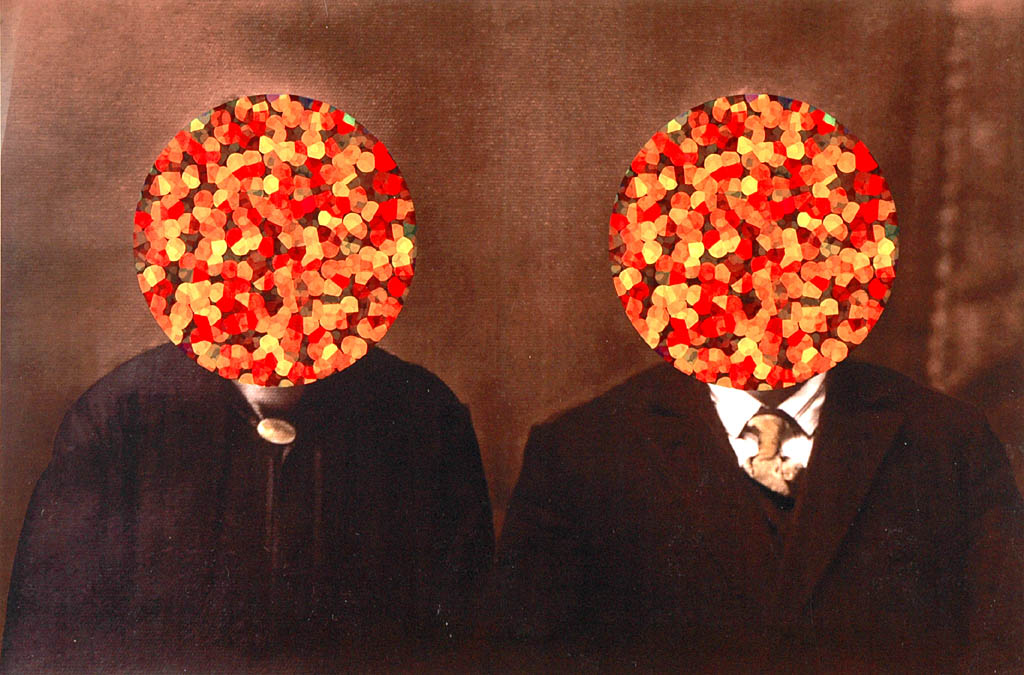
Monidło dla Polski na XXI wiek (2000)
digital photography on canvas
Flower Power series

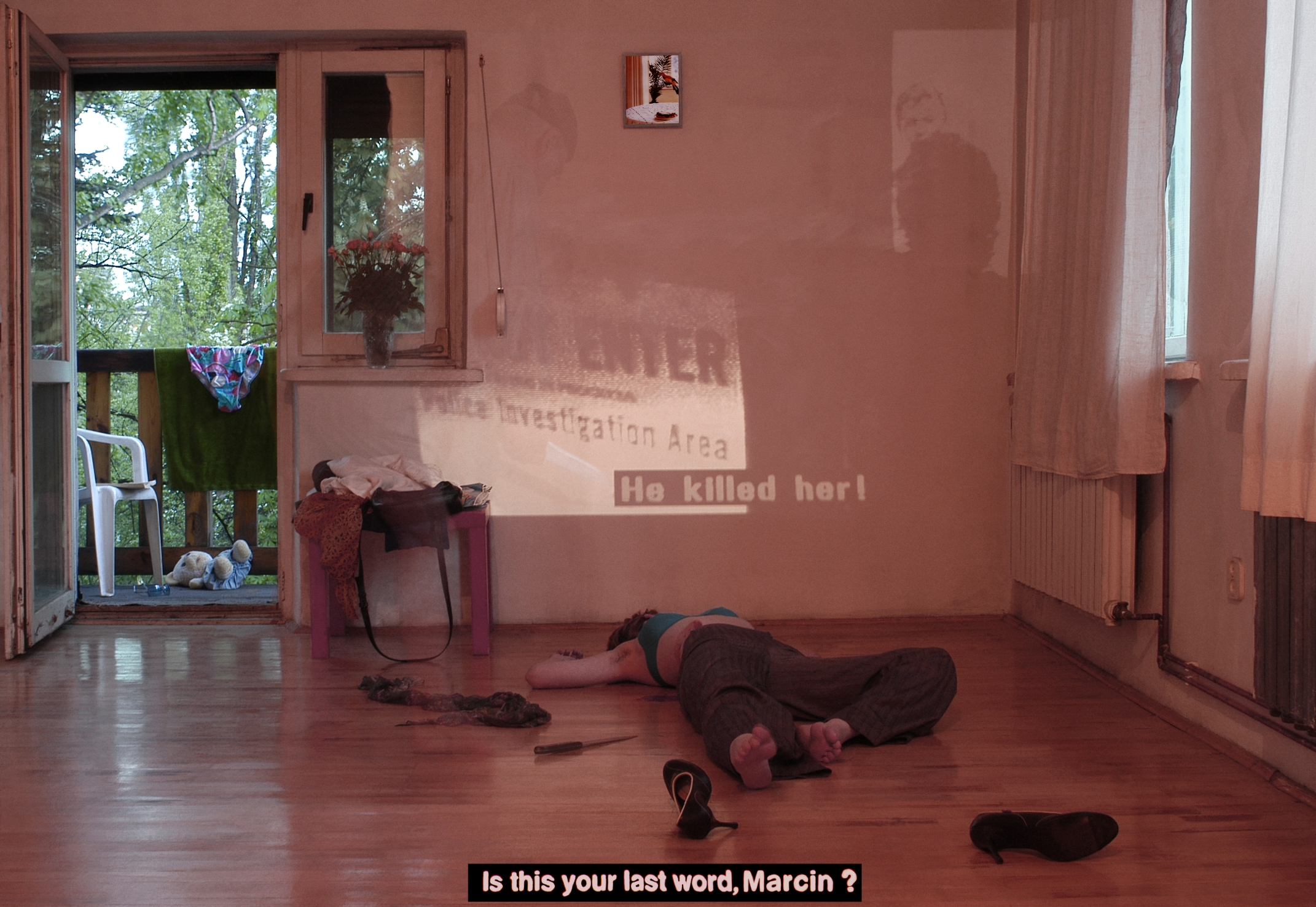
I am telling you a secret (2004)
digital photography
series

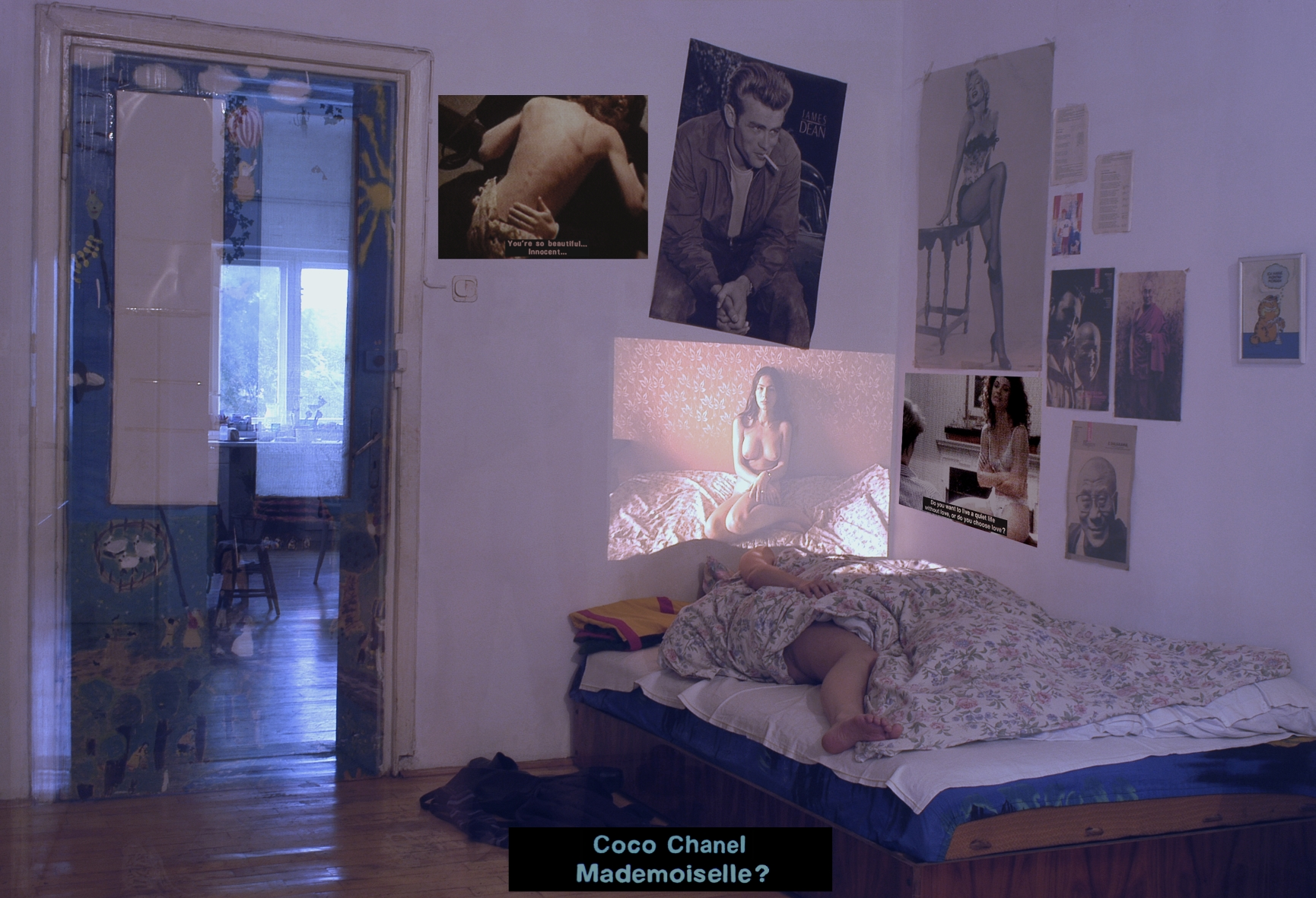
I am telling you a secret (2004)
digital photography
series

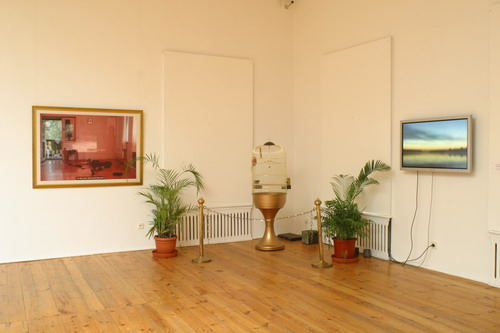
Marcel, or dream with parrot (2004)
installation
Łódź Biennale

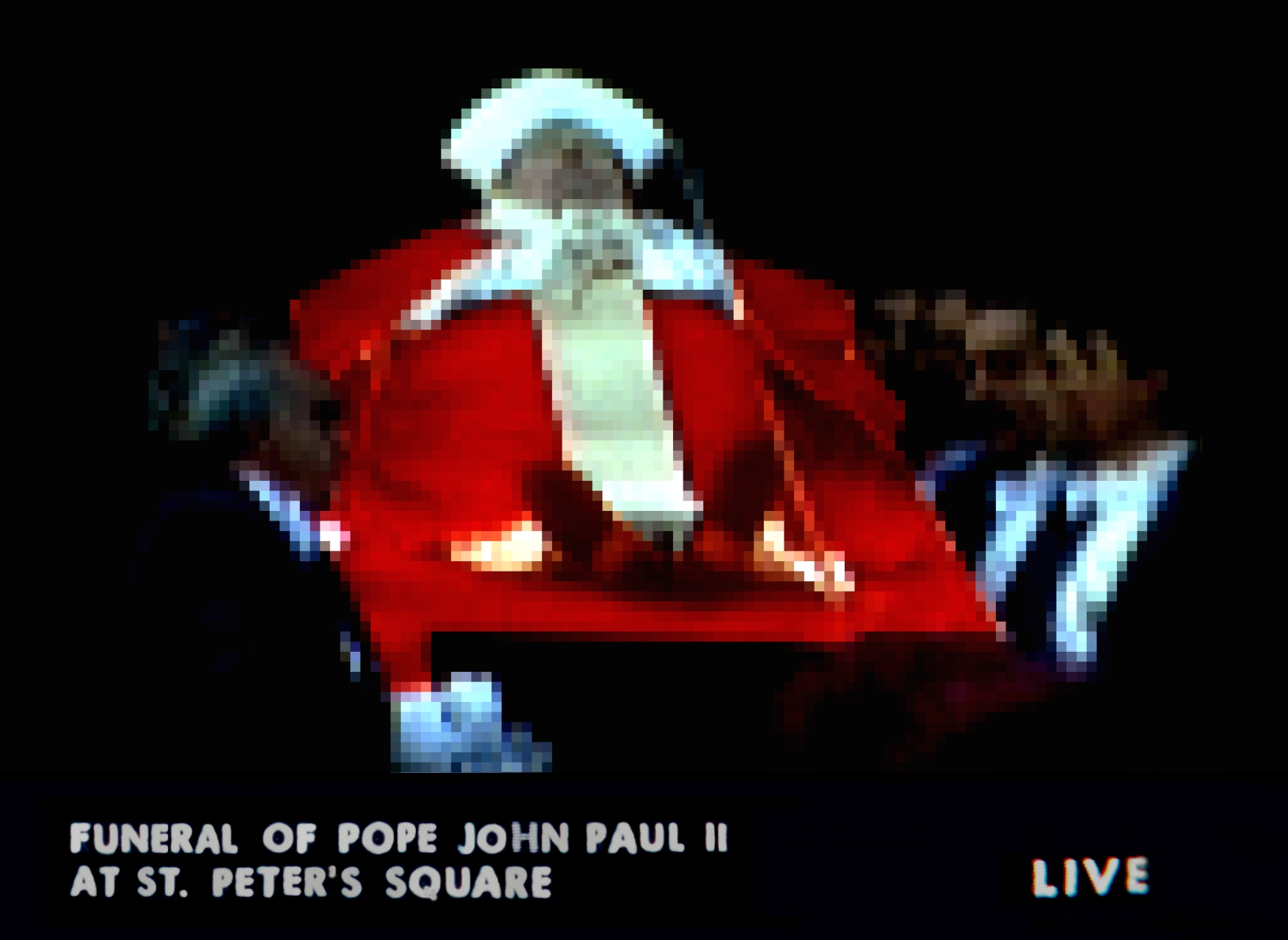
TV Stories (2006)
oil on canvas
series

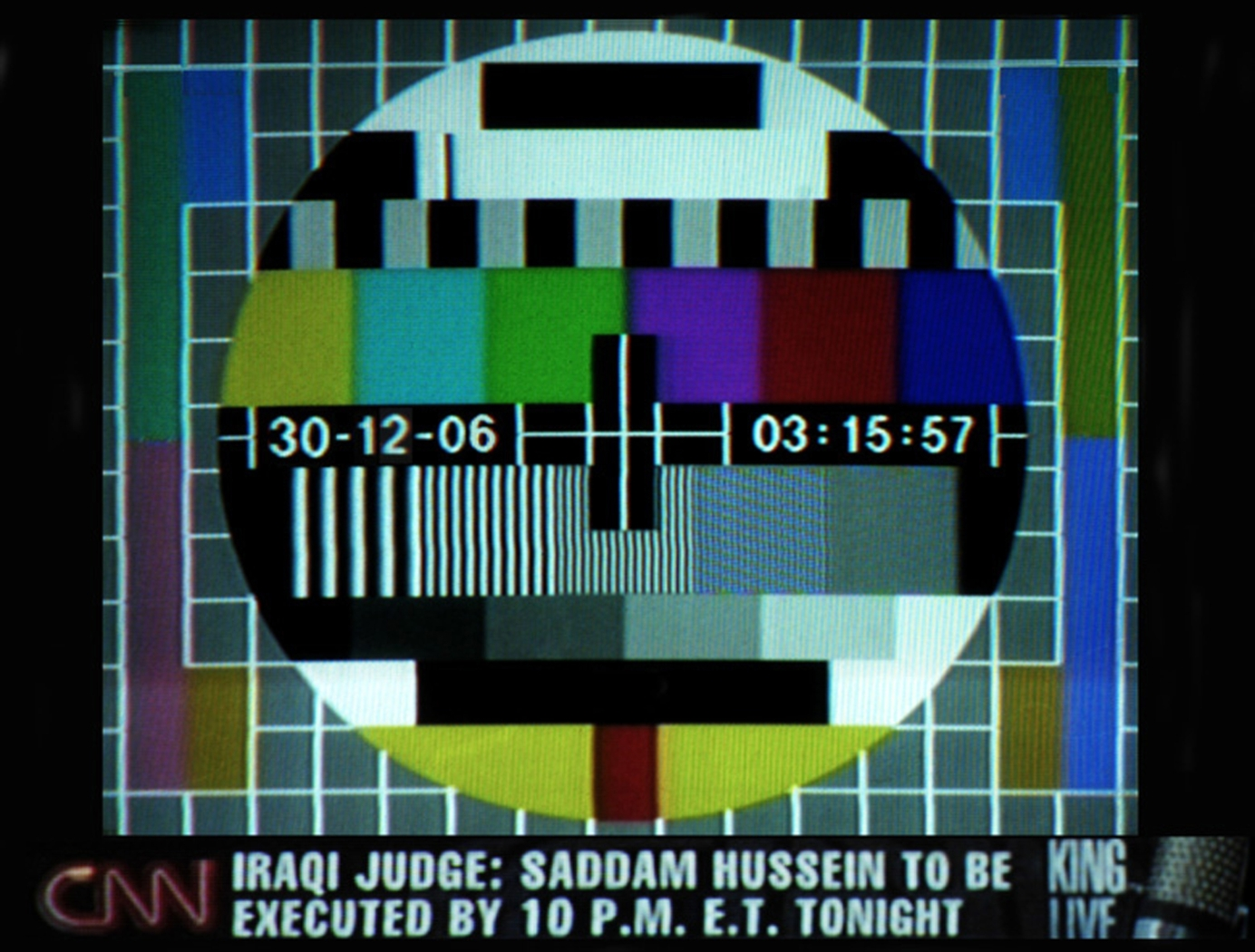
TV Stories (2006)
oil on canvas
series
