= Museum of Zamość =

Coordinates: 50°43′14″N 23°15′31″E

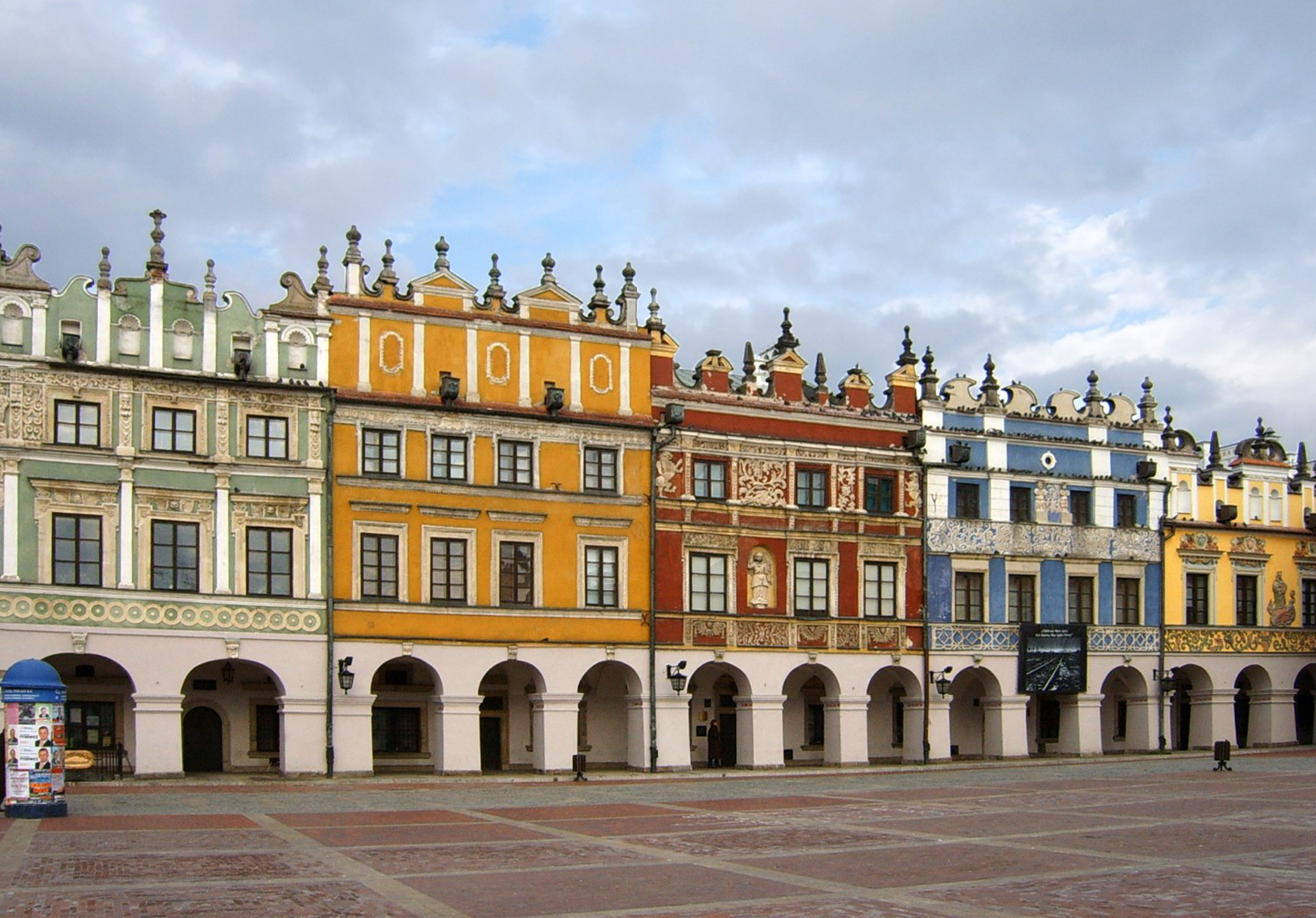
- Main branch in the Old City
- Established: 1926
- Location: Zamość, Poland
- Type: National museum
- Website: http://muzeum-zamojskie.pl/

The Museum of Zamość (Polish: Muzeum Zamojskie) is a registered museum in Poland, founded in the historic city of Zamość in 1926 during the interbellum. It is located in the centre of the Old City, a UNESCO World Heritage Site. The exhibition spaces are arranged at the upper floors of the meticulously restored tenement houses (kamienice) built during the Renaissance by immigrant Armenians in Poland who settled there in 1585, thanks to privileges granted by the Grand Hetman of the Crown Jan Zamoyski. The Museum is divided into six departments including Archeology, Library, Ethnography, General History, the Rotunda, and Education.

== Mission statement ==
The mission of the Museum is the collection, protection, and maintenance of cultural artefacts relating to the history of the city of Zamość and surrounding region. They include archaeological finds, precious artwork, and cultural phenomena put on display and made available for scientific research as well as educational activities.
