= Łaźnia Centre for Contemporary Art =

Art centre in Gdańsk, Poland

Coordinates: 54°20′30″N 18°39′29″E

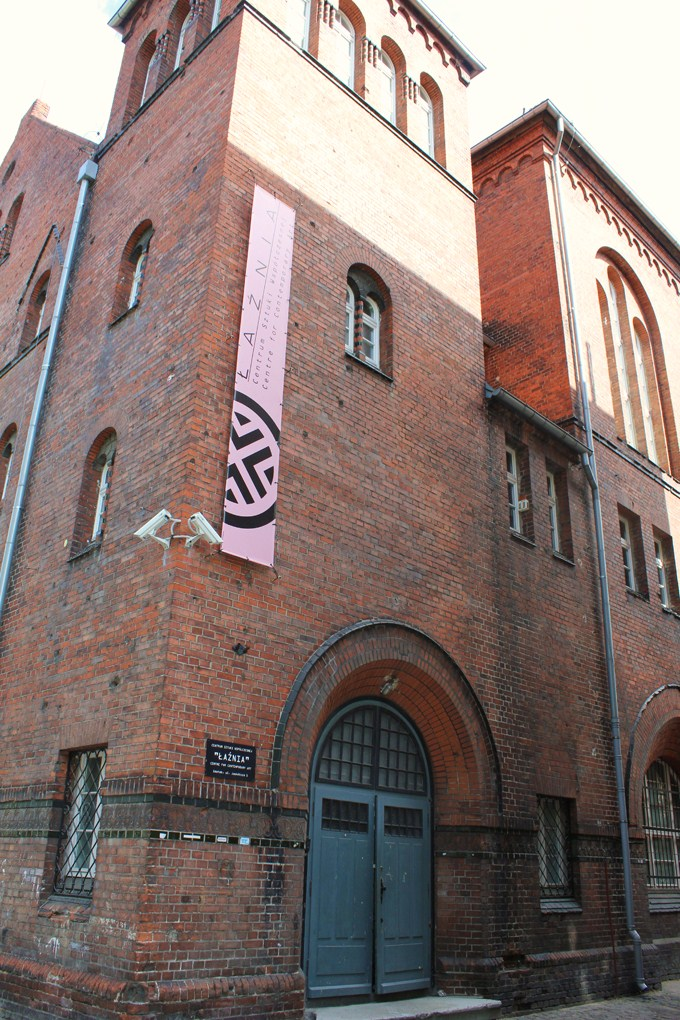
Laznia building

The "Łaźnia" Centre for Contemporary Art is a municipal cultural institution and art gallery in the Dolne Miasto district of Gdańsk, Poland, located in the abandoned municipal bathhouse. The word "łaźnia" means "bathhouse" in Polish.

== History of the building ==
The municipal bathhouse was built in 1905, including recreational and sports facilities (a three-storey brick building with a basement, 2 floors, an attic and a partial cellar). In the original building there were shower units, bath rooms and sanitary rooms and on the second floor there was a gym. The building performed its function from the end of World War II up to the 1970s. In the latter period the building was converted into a ‘Location for Sanitary Procedures’ used by the Civil defence. In reality it was a place for deactivation of personal radioactive contamination for the Żarnowiec Nuclear Power Plant. In 1987 the bathhouse was put out of operation due to a poor technical condition and scheduled for a complete renovation. In 1989 renovation was stopped due to the lack of funds. The building was left empty and fell into gradual ruin.

== History of the art centre ==
First exhibitions in the building of the bathhouse took place in 1992 on the initiative of students of the Academy of Fine Arts (pl:Akademia Sztuk Pięknych w Gdańsku) and artists associated with the Wyspa Gallery. At the same time artists attempted to create there a permanent institution for presentation of contemporary art. After various changes of concepts the institution was founded in 1998, according to the project of art critic Aneta Szyłak and professor of the Academy of Fine Arts Grzegorz Klaman as the Łaźnia Centre for Contemporary Art and received financing from the city budget.

The directors of Laznia were Aneta Szyłak (1998-2001), Małgorzata Lisiewicz (2001-2003), Jadwiga Charzyńska (2003-current).

== Exhibitions ==
- "Public (Re)Collections" (in Polish)

== Łaźnia II ==
"Łaźnia II" is an extension of Łaźnia CCA, established as part of the district revitalization program in the Novy Port district of Gdansk. It is also to be located in a former bathhouse, by 5 Dockers' Strike Street.
