= Łódź Biennale =

The Łódź Biennale (English: Lodz Biennale) was an international art exhibition that was founded by Ryszard Wasko in 2004 in Łódź, and is managed and supervised by the International Artists' Museum. The biennale is based upon ideas developed during the Construction in Process.

In 2004, the biennale consisted of three parts: an International part, a Polish part, and a Łódź part. The biennale had more than 8000 visitors and 93 artists form the whole world took part in the international exhibition.

In 2006, the biennale focused on Polish art.
