= Museum of the Puck Region =

Heritage museum in Puck, Poland

54°43′15.73″N 18°24′39.71″E

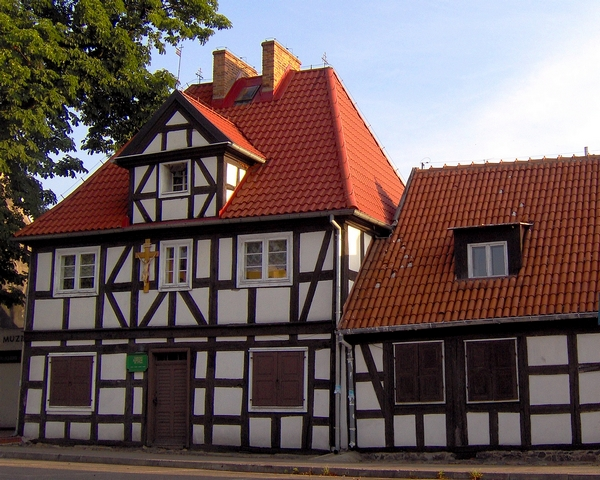
Building of museum, formerly hospital, built in 1681

The Florian Ceynowa Museum of the Puck Region in Puck-(Polish: Muzeum Ziemi Puckiej im. Floriana Ceynowy w Pucku) is museum presenting cultural heritage of Puck region.

It origins from Station for Collecting Cultural Values and Disseminating Knowledge about the Kashubian Region, founded in 1970. Station was carrying scientific research and gathering historical objects relating to the region.

In 1975 Ethnographical Department of Station was open, and in 1976 Historical Department. In the end of the 1970s, due to archaeological discovery of medieval port, Archaeological Section was formed.

In 1980 status of museum was granted to Station, which became "The Museum of the Puck Region"

Since 1973 Station (later Museum) was hosted in former hospital and nursing home building, origin from 1681 year. In 1987 museum opened two other parts: tenements by main city square (Market Place) contain exhibitions of an archaeological and historical items and open-air museum "Gbursk Croft" in Nadole shows life of rich peasant family. In hospital building remain ethnographical part of museum.

During 30th anniversary museum was named The Florian Ceynowa Museum of the Puck Region in Puck to memorize Florian Ceynowa-Kashubian doctor, writer and politician.
