= Danziger Höhe =

Coordinates: 54°11′43″N 18°00′59″E

Territory of West Prussia with district borders and the Danziger Höhe highlighted

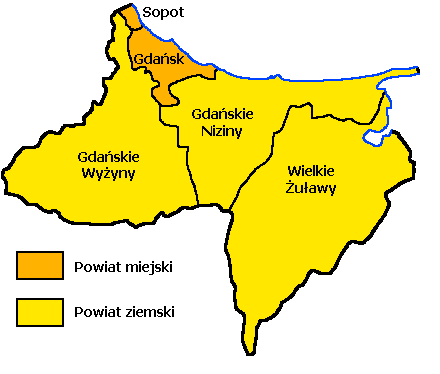
Territory of the Free City with two urban districts (orange) and three rural districts (yellow), Danziger Höhe in the west

The Danziger Höhe (i.e. Danzig Heights; Kreis Danziger Höhe) was an administrative district founded in 1887 and dissolved in 1939. The district administration was based in the City of Danzig, which itself did not form part of the district but was an independent city (Stadtkreis). The area Danziger Höhe covered is now within Poland.

== History ==
The district was formed from parts of the previous Danzig Rural District within the Danzig Region in the province of West Prussia, within the Kingdom of Prussia, itself a part of Germany since 1871. In 1910, the district had 53,506 inhabitants, of which 23,955 were Protestant and 29,206 were Catholic. 9.7% had officially declared that they spoke the Kashubian language.

After the First World War, when the Treaty of Versailles came into effect in 1920, Danziger Höhe became a district in the new Free City of Danzig. The district was enlarged by a number of municipalities from neighbouring West Prussian districts of Neustadt, Karthaus, Berent and Dirschau, which otherwise became part of the Second Polish Republic as part of the Pomeranian Voivodeship. Some municipalities in the Danziger Höhe district were also ceded to Poland.

== Demographics ==
The district had a majority German population, with minorities of Kashubians and Poles.

Ethnolinguistic structure of Danziger Höhe
Year	Population	German		Polish / Kashubian / Bilingual / Other	
1905	50,148	44,113	88.0%	6,035	12.0%
1910	53,506	47,397	88.6%	6,109	11.4%

== Component cities and towns ==
Towns and cities in the Danzig Heights district
Official name 1887-1939	name variant(s)	official name after 1945	population (year)	status	area part of Höhe district	before part of district
Adlig Groß Czapielken till 1923, Schaplitz since		Wielki Czapielsk Szlachecki	164 (1910)	manorial ward, merged in Königlich Czapielken in 1929	1920-1939	Karthaus
Altdorf		Stara Wieś	52 (1910)	municipality, then merged in Danzig City	1887-1933	Danzig rural
Artschau		Arciszewo	103 (1910)	manorial ward, merged in Straschin-Prangschin in 1929	1887-1939	Danzig rural
Babenthal	Babendoll	Babidół	133 (1910); 278 (1929)	manorial ward till 1929, then municipality	1920-1939	Karthaus
Bangschin	Bendieszin	Będzieszyn	174 (1910)	manorial ward, merged in Praust in 1929	1887-1939	Danzig rural
Bankau		Bąkowo	235 (1910)	manorial ward, merged in Jenkau in 1929	1887-1939	Danzig rural
Barenhütte	Baarenhütte	Borowina	248 (1910); 287 (1929)	municipality	1920-1939	Berent
Bechsteinswalde		Kamionka	130 (1910)	manorial ward, merged in Subbowitz in 1929	1920-1939	Dirschau
Bissau	Biesowo	Bysewo	678 (1910)	municipality, ceded to Kartuzy County	1887-1920	Danzig rural
Bölkau see: Klein Bölkau						
Borgfeld		Borkowo Łostowickie	343 (1910); 356 (1929)	municipality	1887-1939	Danzig rural
Borrenschin	Boręcin	Borzęcin	27 (1910)	manorial ward; merged in Gischkau in 1929	1887-1939	Danzig rural
Bösendorf	Zławieś	Zła Wieś	138 (1910)	municipality	1887-1939	Danzig rural
Braunsdorf		Błotnia	395 (1910)	municipality	1887-1939	Danzig rural
Brentau	Brentowo	Brętowo	1,179 (1910)	municipality, merged in Danzig City	1887-1933	Danzig rural
Brösen	Bresen	Brzeźno	2,504 (1910)	town; merged in Danzig City	1887-1914	Danzig rural
Buschkau see: Ober Buschkau						
Czapeln		Czaple	121 (1910)	manorial ward; ceded to Kartuzy County	1887-1920	Danzig rural
Czerniau till 1906, Scherniau since		Czerniewo	254 (1910); 323 (1929)	municipality	1887-1939	Danzig rural
Czerniau, Gutsbezirk till 1905, Schwarzenfelde since		Czerniec	124 (1910)	manorial ward; merged in Czerniau (munic.) in 1929	1887-1939	Danzig rural
Domachau		Domachowo	118 (1910)	manorial ward; merged in Saskoschin in 1929	1887-1939	Danzig rural
Ellerbruch		Olszanka	239 (1910); 203 (1929)	municipality	1920-1939	Berent
Ellernitz		Lniska	108 (1910)	manorial ward; ceded to Kartuzy County	1887-1920	Danzig rural
Emaus		Emaus	2,217 (1910)	municipality; merged in Danzig City	1887-1934	Danzig rural
Gischkau		Juszkowo	357 (1910)	municipality	1887-1939	Danzig rural
Glasberg		Szklana Góra	299 (1910); 234 (1929)	municipality	1920-1939	Karthaus
Glettkau	Gletkowo	Jelitkowo	254 (1910)	municipality, merged in Oliva in 1901, which again merged in Danzig City	1887-1925	Danzig rural
Gluckau		Klukowo	574 (1910)	municipality, ceded to Kartuzy County	1887-1920	Danzig rural
Goldkrug		Złota Karczma	24 (1905); 39 (1929)	locality of Mattern (ceded to Kartuzy Cty in 1920) remaining, upgraded to municipality	1887-1939	Danzig rural
Goschin	Goschyn	Goszyn	212 (1910)	manorial ward, merged in Klein Bölkau in 1929	1887-1939	Danzig rural
Grenzacker		Bliziny	142 (1910); 114 (1929)	municipality	1920-1939	Berent
Grenzdorf		Graniczna Wieś	279 (1910)	municipality	1887-1939	Danzig rural
Groß Bölkau	Groß Billekaw	Bielkowo	266 (1910)	manorial ward, merged in Löblau in 1929	1887-1939	Danzig rural
Groß Golmkau till 1929, Golmkau since		Gołąbkowo	495 (1929)	municipality	1920-1939	Dirschau
Groß Kleschkau till 1929, Kleschkau since		Kleszczewo	219 (1910)	municipality	1887-1939	Danzig rural
Groß Kleschkau, Gutsbezirk		Kleszczewo	225 (1910)	manorial ward, merged in Groß Kleschkau (munic.) in 1929	1887-1939	Danzig rural
Groß Paglau		Pawłowo	493 (1910); 257 (1929)	manorial ward till 1929, then municipality	1920-1939	Berent
Groß Saalau		Żuława	252 (1910)	manorial ward, merged in Saalau in 1929	1887-1939	Danzig rural
Groß Trampken		Trąbki Wielkie	428 (1910); 506 (1929)	municipality	1887-1939	Danzig rural
Groß Trampken, Gutsbezirk		Trąbki Wielkie	133 (1910)	manorial ward, merged in Groß Trampken (munic.) in 1929	1887-1939	Danzig rural
Guteherberge	Lipicz	Lipce	418 (1910); 473 (1929)	municipality, merged in Danzig City	1887-1939	Danzig rural
Heiligenbrunn		Studzienka	742 (1905)	locality, merged in Danzig City	1887-1902	Danzig rural
Hoch Kelpin till 1929, Kelpin since		Kiełpino Górne	251 (1929)	municipality since merging Hoch Kelpin (man. wd.) and Smengorschin in 1908	1887-1939	Danzig rural
Hoch Kelpin, Gutsbezirk		Kiełpino Górne	246 (1910)	manorial ward, merged in Hoch Kelpin (munic.) in 1908	1887-1939	Danzig rural
Hochstrieß	Striesz	Bystrzec Górny 1945–1948, Strzyża Górna since	1,322 (1895); 3,399 (1905)	manorial ward, merged in Danzig City on 1 April 1902	1887-1902	Danzig rural
Hohenstein		Pszczółki	820 (1910); 1,188 (1929)	municipality	1920-1939	Dirschau
Jenkau	Janichowo	Jankowo Gdańskie	137 (1910); 505 (1929)	manorial ward till 1929, then municipality	1887-1939	Danzig rural
Jetau	Groß Jetau	Jagatowo	364 (1910); 314 (1929)	municipality	1887-1939	Danzig rural
Johannisthal		Dolinka	72 (1910)	manorial ward, merged in Ober Buschkau in 1929	1887-1939	Danzig rural
Katzke		Kaczki	168 (1910)	manorial ward till 1929, then municipality	1887-1939	Danzig rural
Kelpin see: Hoch Kelpin						
Kladau	Kladow	Kłodawa	491 (1910)	municipality	1887-1939	Danzig rural
Klanau		Klonowo Dolne	455 (1910); 386 (1929)	municipality since merging Nieder Klanau and Ober Klanau in 1929	1920-1939	Karthaus
Klein Bölkau till 1929, Bölkau since	Bielkowo Małe	Bielkówko	856 (1910); 1,110 (1929)	municipality	1887-1939	Danzig rural
Klein Kelpin		Kiełpinek	142 (1910); 139 (1929)	manorial ward till 1929, then municipality	1887-1939	Danzig rural
Klein Kleschkau, Gutsbezirk		Kleszczewko	158 (1910)	manorial ward, merged in Langenau in 1929	1887-1939	Danzig rural
Klein Saalau till 1929, Saalau since		Żuławka	97 (1910); 498 (1929)	municipality	1887-1939	Danzig rural
Klein Trampken		Trąbki Małe	220 (1910)	municipality	1887-1939	Danzig rural
Klempin		Klępiny	161 (1910); 379 (1929)	municipality	1920-1939	Dirschau
Kleschkau see: Groß Kleschkau						
Kohling	Koloninek	Kolnik	350 (1910); 422 (1929)	municipality	1920-1939	Dirschau
Kokoschken		Kokoszki	215 (1910)	manorial ward, ceded to Kartuzy County	1887-1920	Danzig rural
Königlich Czapielken till 1923, Königlich Schaplitz 1923-1929; Schaplitz since	Czapielsk Królewski	Czapielsk	85 (1910); 263 (1929)	municipality	1920-1939	Karthaus
Konradshammer	Conradshammer	Przymorze	279 (1910)	locality, merged in Oliva in 1907, which again merged in Danzig City	1887-1925	Danzig rural
Kowall		Kowale	202 (1910)	municipality	1887-1939	Danzig rural
Lagschau	Lageschaw	Łaguszewo	173 (1910)	manorial ward, merged in Klempin in 1929	1887-1939	Danzig rural
Lamenstein	Elganowo	Ełganowo	711 (1910); 776 (1929)	municipality	1920-1939	Dirschau
Langenau	Langnowo	Łęgowo	937 (1910); 1,204 (1929)	municipality	1887-1939	Danzig rural
Leesen	Lezno	Leźno	302 (1910)	manorial ward, ceded to Kartuzy County	1887-1920	Danzig rural
Lissau		Lisewiec	125 (1910)	manorial ward, merged in Klein Bölkau in 1929	1887-1939	Danzig rural
Löblau	Lubelau	Lublewo Gdańskie	934 (1910); 1,277 (1929)	municipality	1887-1939	Danzig rural
Maczkau till 1907, Matzkau since	Matschkau	Maćkowy	169 (1910)	manorial ward, merged in Ohra in 1929, which later merged in Danzig City	1887-1933	Danzig rural
Maidahnen		Majdany	131 (1910); 122 (1929)	municipality	1920-1939	Karthaus
Mallentin	Mallenczyn	Malentyn	8 (1910)	forest ward, merged in Klein Saalau in 1929	1887-1939	Danzig rural
Mariensee		Przywidz	288 (1910); 426 (1929)	manorial ward till 1929, then municipality	1920-1939	Karthaus
Marschau	Marszewy	Marszewo	297 (1910); 258 (1929)	municipality	1920-1939	Karthaus
Mattern		Matarnia	300 (1910)	manorial ward, ceded to Kartuzy County	1887-1920	Danzig rural
Meisterswalde		Mierzeszyn	832 (1910); 804 (1929)	municipality	1887-1939	Danzig rural
Mittel Golmkau		Gołębiewo Średnie	217 (1910)	municipality, merged in Groß Golmkau in 1929	1920-1939	Dirschau
Müggau	Miggau	Migowo	152 (1910); 146 (1929)	manorial ward till 1922, then municipality, later merging in Danzig City	1887-1939	Danzig rural
Nenkau	Nenkowy	Jasień	234 (1910)	manorial ward, merged partially in Hoch Kelpin and Schüddelkau in 1929	1887-1939	Danzig rural
Neuendorf	Hochneuendorf	Nowa Wieś	366 (1910); 278 (1929)	municipality	1920-1939	Karthaus
Niedersommerkau	Klein Szumprczie	Ząbrsko Dolne	117 (1910); 91 (1929)	municipality	1920-1939	Karthaus
Nobel	Konstantinopel	Niegowo	116 (1910); 122 (1929)	municipality	1887-1939	Danzig rural
Ober Buschkau till 1929; Buschkau since		Buszkowy	502 (1910); 709 (1929)	municipality	1920-1939	Karthaus
Oberhölle	Oberhöl	Piekło Górne	144 (1910); 129 (1929)	municipality	1920-1939	Berent
Oberhütte	Oberhütung	Huta Górna	248 (1910); 209 (1929)	municipality	1920-1939	Karthaus
Oberkahlbude	Kolbude; Kolbudy Górne	Kolbudy	348 (1910); 512 (1929)	municipality	1920-1939	Karthaus
Obersommerkau	Groß Szumprczie	Ząbrsko Górne	256 (1910); 187 (1929)	municipality	1920-1939	Karthaus
Ochsenkopf	Ossenkop	Częstocin	118 (1910); 208 (1929)	municipality	1920-1939	Berent
Ohra		Orunia	11,029 (1910)	municipality, merged in Danzig City	1887-1933	Danzig rural
Oliva		Oliwa	9,346 (1925)	municipality, merged in Danzig City	1887-1925	Danzig rural
Oliva, Forst		Oliwa-Leśniczówko	52 (1910); 125 (1929)	forest ward	1887-1939	Danzig rural
Ostroschken	Ostroszken	Ostróżki	201 (1910); 214 (1929)	municipality	1920-1939	Karthaus
Ottomin		Otomin	60 (1905); 82 (1929)	forest ward, ceded from Sulmin in 1907, upgraded to municipality in 1929	1887-1939	Danzig rural
Pietzkendorf		Piecki	338 (1910); 357 (1929)	municipality	1887-1939	Danzig rural
Pomlau		Pomlewo	432 (1910); 365 (1929)	municipality	1920-1939	Karthaus
Postelau		Postołowo	405 (1910); 432 (1929)	municipality	1920-1939	Dirschau
Prangenau till 1923, Prangenau im Radaunetal since		Pręgowo	621 (1910); 576 (1929)	municipality	1920-1939	Karthaus
Prangschin	Pręgszyn	Prędzieszyn	234 (1910)	manorial ward, merged in Straschin-Prangschin in 1929	1887-1939	Danzig rural
Praust		Pruszcz 1945–1951, Pruszcz Gdański since	2,841 (1910); 3,878 (1929)	municipality, merged in Danzig City in 1939	1887-1939	Danzig rural
Prausterkrug		Pruska Karczma	9 (1910)	forest ward, merged in Grenzdorf in 1929	1887-1939	Danzig rural
Rambau		Rębowo	82 (1910)	manorial ward partitioned from Sulmin in 1907, merged in Schüddelkau in 1929	1887-1939	Danzig rural
Rambeltsch		Rębielcz	401 (1910); 663 (1929)	municipality	1920-1939	Dirschau
Ramkau	Rambechau	Rębiechowo	538 (1910)	municipality, ceded to Kartuzy County	1887-1920	Danzig rural
Rexin		Rekcin	158 (1910)	manorial ward, merged in Klein Saalau in 1929	1887-1939	Danzig rural
Richthof (old) see: Sulmin						
Richthof (new)	Rychtow	Otomin		partitioned from Richthof (aka Sulmin, ceded to Kartuzy County), upgraded to municipality in 1923, merged in Ottomin in 1929	1887-1939	Danzig rural
Rosenberg	Rozemberk	Różyny	474 (1910); 778 (1929)	municipality	1887-1939	Danzig rural
Rottmannsdorf	Rothmancke	Rotmanka	155 (1910)	manorial ward, merged in Straschin-Prangschin in 1929	1887-1939	Danzig rural
Russoschin	Russoczyn	Rusocin	205 (1910)	manorial ward, merged in Langenau in 1929	1887-1939	Danzig rural
Saalau see: Klein Saalau						
Saskoschin	Saskoczin	Zaskoczyn	164 (1910); 247 (1929)	manorial ward till 1929, then municipality	1887-1939	Danzig rural
Saspe		Zaspa	3,149 (1910)	manorial ward, merged in Danzig City	1887-1914	Danzig rural
Schäferei	Széperëjô	Owczarnia	83 (1910)	manorial ward, ceded to Kartuzy County	1887-1920	Danzig rural
Schaplitz see: Königlich Czapielken						
Scharfenort		Ostróżek	150 (1910); 172 (1929)	manorial ward, merged in Straschin-Prangschin in 1929	1887-1939	Danzig rural
Scharshütte		Gromadzin	133 (1910); 109 (1929)	municipality	1920-1939	Berent
Schellmühl	Szelmeja	Młyniska	533 (1910)	municipality, merged in Danzig City	1887-1914	Danzig rural
Scherniau see: Czerniau						
Schönbeck		Miłowo	371 (1910); 296 (1929)	municipality	1920-1939	Karthaus
Schönfeld bei Danzig		Łostowice	407 (1910); 768 (1929)	municipality	1887-1939	Danzig rural
Schönfeld, Gutsbezirk		Łostowice	88 (1910)	manorial ward, merged in Schönfeld (munic.) in 1929	1887-1939	Danzig rural
Schönwarling	Schuwerinken	Skowarcz	691 (1910); 769 (1929)	municipality	1887-1939	Danzig rural
Schüddelkau		Szadółki	262 (1910); 557 (1929)	municipality	1887-1939	Danzig rural
Schwarzenfelde see: Czerniau, Gutsbezirk						
Schwarzhütte	Czarnahuta	Czarna Huta	116 (1910); 108 (1929)	municipality	1920-1939	Berent
Schwintsch		Świńcz	198 (1910); 362 (1929)	manorial ward till 1929, then municipality	1887-1939	Danzig rural
Senslau	Żenisławki	Żelisławki	249 (1910)	manorial ward, merged in Rambeltsch in 1929	1920-1939	Dirschau
Smengorschin		Smęgorzyno	65 (1905)	manorial ward, merged in Hoch Kelpin in 1908	1887-1939	Danzig rural
Sobbowitz		Sobowidz	155 (1910)	manorial ward till 1929, then municipality	1920-1939	Dirschau
Stangenwalde	Stęgwałd	Jodłowno	207 (1910); 201 (1929)	municipality	1920-1939	Karthaus
Straschin		Straszyn	279 (1910)	manorial ward, merged in Straschin-Prangschin in 1929	1887-1939	Danzig rural
Straschin-Prangschin	Straszyn Prędzieszyn	Straszyn	885 (1929)	municipality since merging Artschau, Prangschin, Rottmannsdorf and Straschin in 1929	1887-1939	Danzig rural
Strauchhütte	Strukhuta	Kierzkowo	313 (1910); 268 (1929)	municipality	1920-1939	Berent
Strippau	Strzepowo	Trzepowo	377 (1910); 422 (1929)	municipality	1920-1939	Berent
Strippau, Gutsbezirk	Strzepowo	Trzepowo	78 (1910)	manorial ward, merged in the homonymous municipality in 1929	1920-1939	Berent
Sukczyn till 1894, Suckschin since		Żukczyn	349 (1910); 331 (1929)	municipality	1887-1939	Danzig rural
Sulmin till 1908, Richthof1908-1920; Sulmin since		Sulmin	270 (1910)	manorial ward till 1907, then municipality, ceded to Kartuzy County	1887-1920	Danzig rural
Tiefenthal	Dypendal	Roztoka	172 (1910); 121 (1929)	municipality	1920-1939	Karthaus
Trampken		Trąbki	7 (1910)	forest ward, merged in Groß Trampken (munic.) in 1929	1887-1939	Danzig rural
Trockenhütte	Suchahuta	Sucha Huta	301 (1910); 242 (1929)	municipality	1920-1939	Berent
Uhlkau		Ulkowy	259 (1910); 241 (1929)	manorial ward till 1920, then municipality	1920-1939	Dirschau
Unter Buschkau		Buszkowy Dolne	156 (1910)	manorial ward, merged in Ober Buschkau in 1929	1920-1939	Karthaus
Wartsch		Warcz	309 (1910); 294 (1929)	municipality	1887-1939	Danzig rural
Wartsch, Gutsbezirk		Warcz	66 (1910)	manorial ward, merged in the homonymous municipality in 1929	1887-1939	Danzig rural
Schweinebude till 1889, Wiesenthal since	Swienie Budy	Drzewina	149 (1910); 153 (1929)	municipality	1920-1939	Berent
Wonneberg	Wujeścisko	Ujeścisko	742 (1910); 990 (1929)	manorial ward, merged in Straschin-Prangschin in 1929	1887-1939	Danzig rural
Woyanow		Wojanowo	176 (1910)	manorial ward, merged in Schwintsch in 1929, and was redistricted to Praust in 1935	1887-1939	Danzig rural
Zankenzin	Zankenczyn	Zakoniczyn	143 (1910)	manorial ward, merged in Schönfeld (munic.) in 1929	1887-1939	Danzig rural
Zigankenberg		Góra Cygańska	155 (1910)	locality, merged in Danzig City	1887-1902	Danzig rural
Zipplau		Cieplewo	155 (1910)	municipality	1887-1939	Danzig rural
Zoppot		Sopot	155 (1910)	upgraded to independent city (urban district)	1920, 10 January to 25 March	Neustadt

== Literature ==
- Michael Rademacher: Deutsche Verwaltungsgeschichte Westpreußen, Kreis Danziger Höhe (2006) (in German).
