= Ząbrsko =

Ząbrsko may refer to the following places in Poland:

- Ząbrsko Dolne
- Ząbrsko Górne
