= Goszyn railway station =

Railway station in Poland

Goszyn
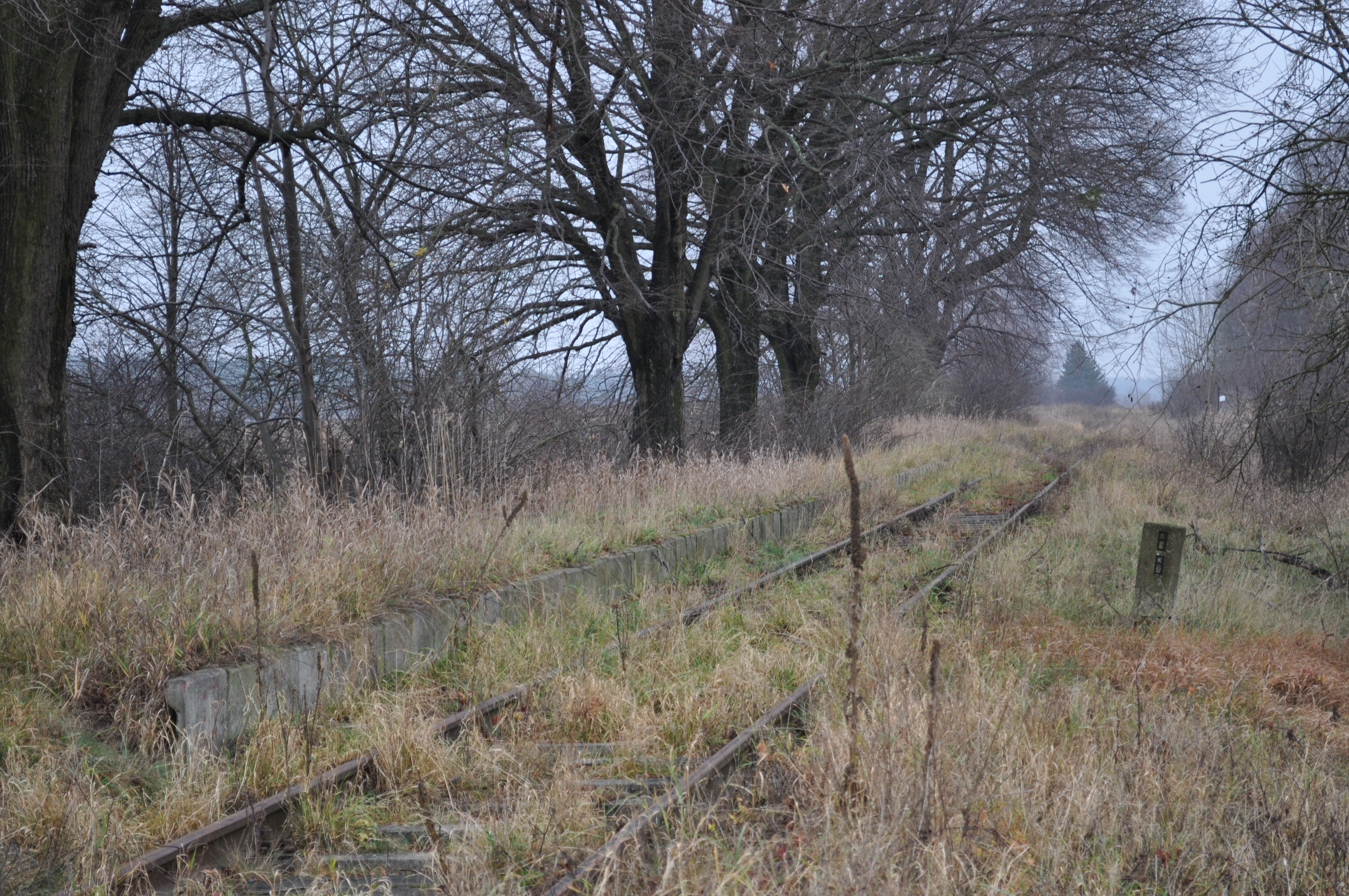

General information
- Location: Goszyn; Poland
- Owner: Polskie Koleje Państwowe S.A.

Construction
- Structure type: Building: Never existed Depot: Never existed Water tower: Never existed

History
- Former names: Goschin until 1945
Location

Goszyn is a non-operational railway station in Goszyn (Pomeranian Voivodeship), Poland.

== Lines crossing the station ==
Start station	End station	Line type
Pruszcz Gdański	Łeba	Closed
