= Roszkowo =

Roszkowo may refer to the following places:

- Roszkowo, Kościan County in Greater Poland Voivodeship (west-central Poland)
- Roszkowo, Rawicz County in Greater Poland Voivodeship (west-central Poland)
- Roszkowo, Wągrowiec County in Greater Poland Voivodeship (west-central Poland)
- Roszkowo, Pomeranian Voivodeship (north Poland)
