= Gmina Pruszcz Gdański =

Gmina Pruszcz Gdański Pruszcz Gdański Commune
- Gmina
- Flag Coat of arms
- Interactive map of Gmina Pruszcz Gdański
- Coordinates (Pruszcz Gdański): 54°16′N 18°38′E
- Country: Poland
- Voivodeship: Pomeranian
- County: Gdańsk
- Seat: Pruszcz Gdański

Area
  - Total: 142.56 km^{2} (55.04 sq mi)

Population (2016)
  - Total: 28,001
  - Density: 196.42/km^{2} (508.71/sq mi)
- Website: http://pruszczg.ug.gov.pl/

Gmina Pruszcz Gdański is a rural gmina (administrative district) in Gdańsk County, Pomeranian Voivodeship, in northern Poland. Its seat is the town of Pruszcz Gdański, although the town is not part of the territory of the gmina.

The gmina covers an area of 142.56 square kilometres (55.0 sq mi), and as of 2016 its total population is 28,001.

== Villages ==
Gmina Pruszcz Gdański contains the villages and settlements of Arciszewo, Będzieszyn, Bogatka, Borkowo Łostowickie, Borzęcin, Bystra, Bystra-Osiedle, Cieplewo, Dziewięć Włók, Głębokie, Goszyn, Jagatowo, Juszkowo, Krępiec, Lędowo, Łęgowo, Malentyn, Mokry Dwór, Ostatni Grosz, Przejazdowo, Radunica, Rekcin, Rokitnica, Roszkowo, Rotmanka, Rusocin, Straszyn, Świńcz, Weselno, Wiślina, Wiślinka, Wojanowo, Żukczyn, Żuława and Żuławka.

== Neighbouring gminas ==
Gmina Pruszcz Gdański is bordered by the towns of Gdańsk and Pruszcz Gdański, and by the gminas of Cedry Wielkie, Kolbudy, Pszczółki, Suchy Dąb and Trąbki Wielkie.
