= Human Error (musician) =

- Birth name: Rafał Kuczynski
- Born: 21 May 1982 (age 42); Rotmanka, Poland
- Origin: Kępsko, Poland
- Genres: Electronic; ambient
- Occupation: Record producer
- Years active: 2000–present
- Labels: Requiem

Rafał Kuczynski (born 21 May 1982, in Rotmanka, Poland), better known by his stage name Human Error, is a Polish electronic record producer. He mostly works in the ambient music genre and produces only with a computer. Human Error's first songs were made around 2000, and his first official album was released in 2002 by Requiem Records.

Kuczynski achieved another success in 2004 at the "Review of European Internet Art" in Gdańsk organized by the House of Polish-German Cooperation, where he was invited to present his work. Since around 2005, he has been composing illustrative music for books and films. He provided sound, among others: the documentary "TamiTu" directed by Michał Dawidowicz and several short animations directed by Marek Gołda. He is also the author of the soundbook for the book "Eden Park" by the German writer Jaume Hanbei.

The year 2006 brought new ideas and projects, including: Contemporary Electronic Soundscapes. This project is implemented by users of the Polish forum of electronic music creators and listeners, Studio Recording. At the end of 2006, his music was the background for the gallery of Marek Kokorudz, a young photographer from Stargard. The exhibition took place on December 9–22 in Szczecin. This year he also joined the music portal MySpace.

== Discography ==
- 2005 - Shrinke - Land of Gods (promo album)
- 2003 - Tajemnice Ludzkiej Dłoni (publisher: Requiem Records)
- 2002 - Battery Farm (publisher: Requiem Records)

== Interviews ==
- Nowa muzyka: https://web.archive.org/web/20070928010556/http://www.nowamuzyka.pl/artykul.php?id=143
- Gery.pl: http://muzyka.gery.pl/cms/14616,0,Human-Error,wywiad.html
