= Juszkowo railway station =

Railway station in Juszkowo, Poland

Coordinates: 54.2550°N 18.5975°E

Juszkowo
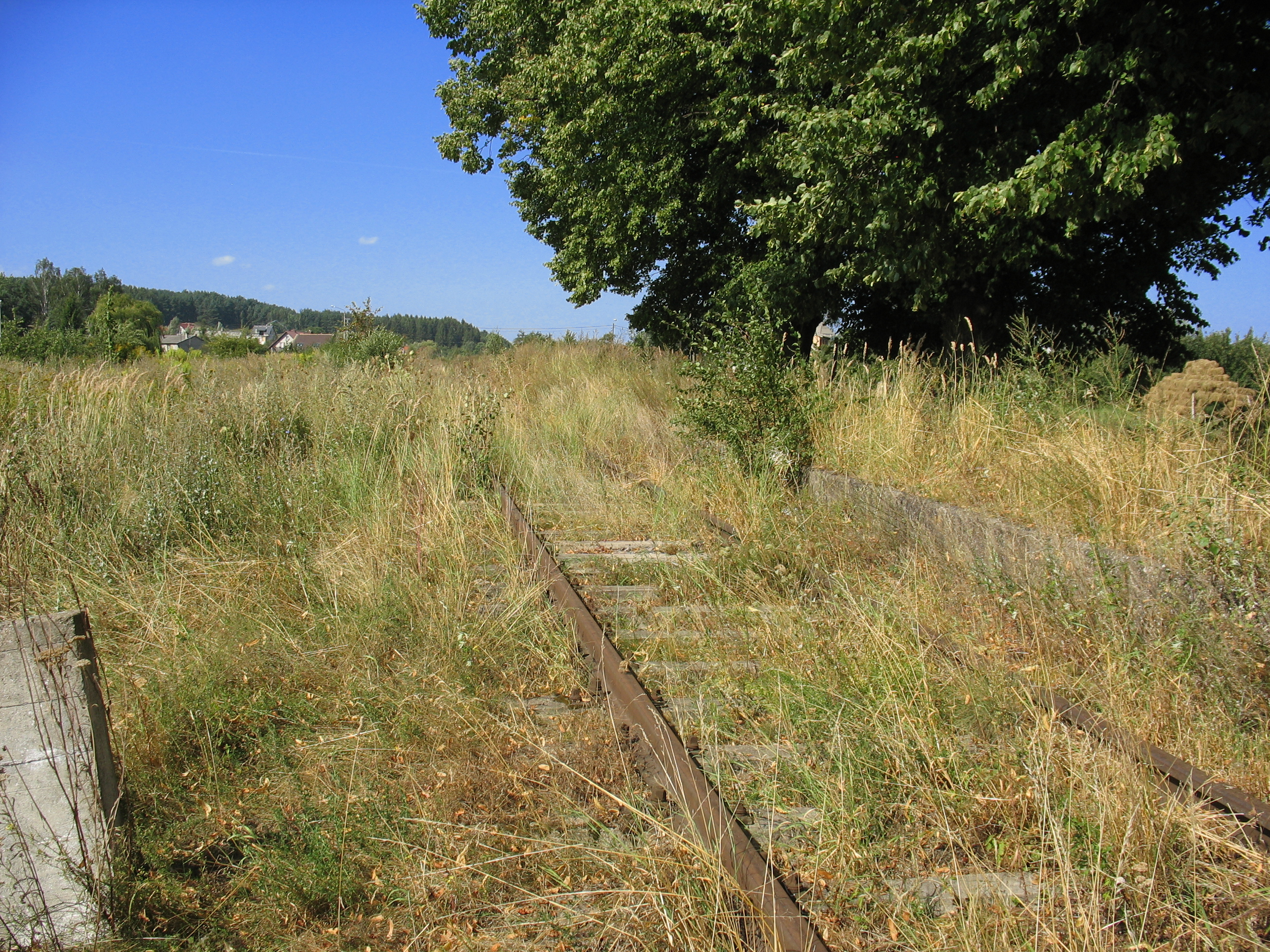

General information
- Location: Juszkowo; Poland
- Owner: Polskie Koleje Państwowe S.A.

Construction
- Structure type: Building: Never existed Depot: Never existed Water tower: Never existed

History
- Former names: Gischkau
Location

Juszkowo is a non-operational railway station in Juszkowo (Pomeranian Voivodeship), Poland.

== Lines crossing the station ==
Start station	End station	Line type
Pruszcz Gdański	Łeba	Closed
