= Cieplewo railway station =

Railway station in Cieplewo, Poland

Coordinates: 54°14′05″N 18°38′51″E

Cieplewo
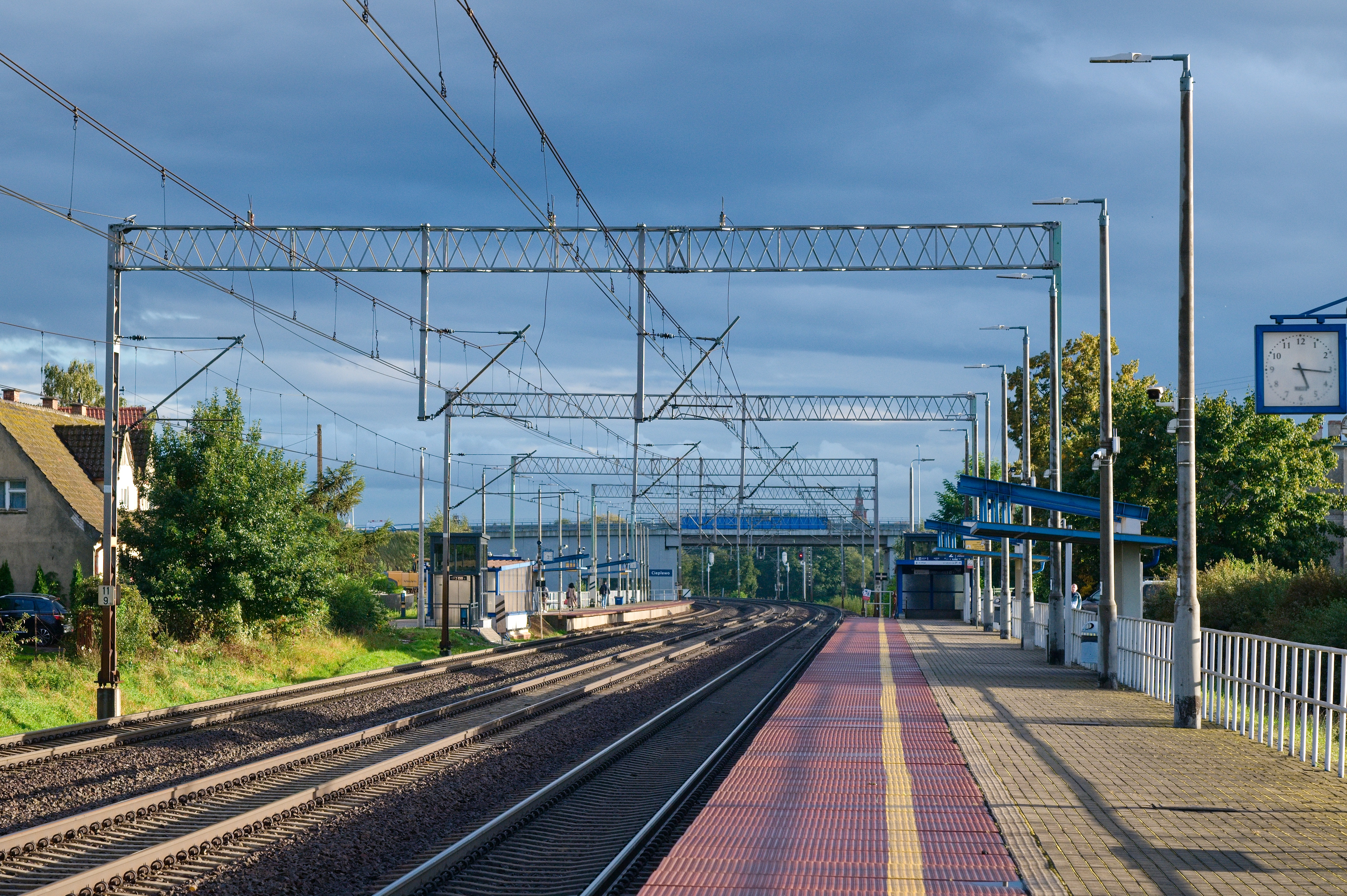

General information
- Location: Cieplewo; Poland
- Owner: Polskie Koleje Państwowe S.A.
- Platforms: 2

Construction
- Structure type: Building: Yes; Depot: No; Water tower: No

History
- Former names: Zipplau
Location

Cieplewo is a railway station in Cieplewo, Poland.

== Lines crossing the station ==
Start station	End station	Line type
Warszawa Wschodnia	Gdańsk Główny	Passenger/Freight
