= Michalin, Pomeranian Voivodeship =

Michalin
- Village
- Location within Poland
- Coordinates: 54°13′34″N 18°17′54″E
- Country: Poland
- Voivodeship: Pomeranian
- County: Gdańsk
- Gmina: Przywidz
- Population: 95

Michalin [miˈxalin] is a village in the administrative district of Gmina Przywidz, within Gdańsk County, Pomeranian Voivodeship, in northern Poland.

For details of the history of the region, see History of Pomerania.
