= Głębokie, Pomeranian Voivodeship =

Głębokie
- Village
- Location within Poland
- Coordinates: 54°17′31″N 18°35′55″E
- Country: Poland
- Voivodeship: Pomeranian
- County: Gdańsk
- Gmina: Pruszcz Gdański

Głębokie ([ɡwɛmˈbɔkʲɛ]; German: Tiefensee) is a village in the administrative district of Gmina Pruszcz Gdański, within Gdańsk County, Pomeranian Voivodeship, in northern Poland.

For details of the history of the region, see History of Pomerania.
