= Bystra, Pomeranian Voivodeship =

Bystra
- Village
- Location within Poland
- Coordinates: 54°18′18″N 18°45′35″E
- Country: Poland
- Voivodeship: Pomeranian
- County: Gdańsk
- Gmina: Pruszcz Gdański
- Population: 496
- Website: http://www.bystra.boo.pl

Bystra [ˈbɨstra] is a village in the administrative district of Gmina Pruszcz Gdański, within Gdańsk County, Pomeranian Voivodeship, in northern Poland.

For details of the history of the region, see History of Pomerania.
