= Marszewska Kolonia =

- Village
- Location within Poland
- Coordinates: 54°15′40″N 18°23′3″E
- Country: Poland
- Voivodeship: Pomeranian
- County: Gdańsk
- Gmina: Przywidz
- Population: 54

Marszewska Kolonia [marˈʂɛfska kɔˈlɔɲa] is a village in the administrative district of Gmina Przywidz, within Gdańsk County, Pomeranian Voivodeship, in northern Poland.

For details of the history of the region, see History of Pomerania.
