= Trzepowo, Pomeranian Voivodeship =

Trzepowo
- Village
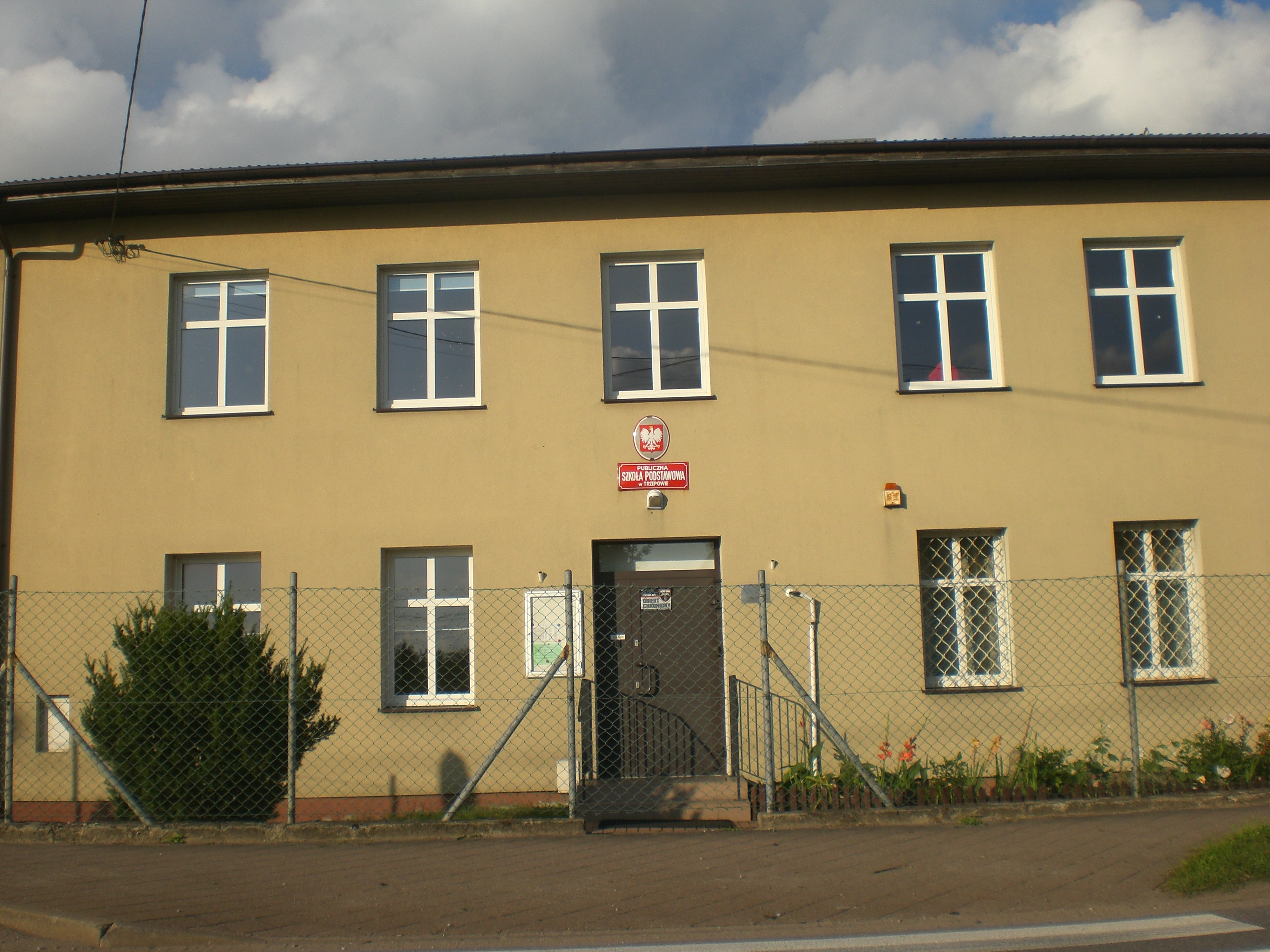

- Location within Poland
- Coordinates: 54°10′7″N 18°16′33″E
- Country: Poland
- Voivodeship: Pomeranian
- County: Gdańsk
- Gmina: Przywidz
- Population: 295
- Time zone: UTC+1 (CET)
  - Summer (DST): UTC+2 (CEST)

Trzepowo [tʂɛˈpɔvɔ] is a village in the administrative district of Gmina Przywidz, within Gdańsk County, Pomeranian Voivodeship, in northern Poland. It is located within the historic region of Pomerania.

The settlement Łąki is part of the village.

Trzepowo was a royal village of the Polish Crown, administratively located in the Tczew County in the Pomeranian Voivodeship.
