= Katarynki =

- Settlement
- Location within Poland
- Coordinates: 54°12′49″N 18°19′51″E
- Country: Poland
- Voivodeship: Pomeranian
- County: Gdańsk
- Gmina: Przywidz
- Population: 22

Katarynki [kataˈrɨnki] is a settlement in the administrative district of Gmina Przywidz, within Gdańsk County, Pomeranian Voivodeship, in northern Poland.

For details of the history of the region, see History of Pomerania.
