= Huta Dolna =

- Village
- Location within Poland
- Coordinates: 54°13′45″N 18°19′37″E
- Country: Poland
- Voivodeship: Pomeranian
- County: Gdańsk
- Gmina: Przywidz
- Population: 83

Huta Dolna [ˈxuta ˈdɔlna] is a village in the administrative district of Gmina Przywidz, within Gdańsk County, Pomeranian Voivodeship, in northern Poland.

For details of the history of the region, see History of Pomerania.
