= Dziewięć Włók, Gdańsk County =

Dziewięć Włók
- Village
- Location within Poland
- Coordinates: 54°18′38″N 18°44′0″E
- Country: Poland
- Voivodeship: Pomeranian
- County: Gdańsk
- Gmina: Pruszcz Gdański
- Population: 147

Dziewięć Włók [ˈd͡ʑɛvjɛnt͡ɕ ˈvwuk] (German: Neunhuben) is a village in the administrative district of Gmina Pruszcz Gdański, within Gdańsk County, Pomeranian Voivodeship, in northern Poland.

For details of the history of the region, see History of Pomerania.
