= Stara Huta, Gdańsk County =

Stara Huta
- Village
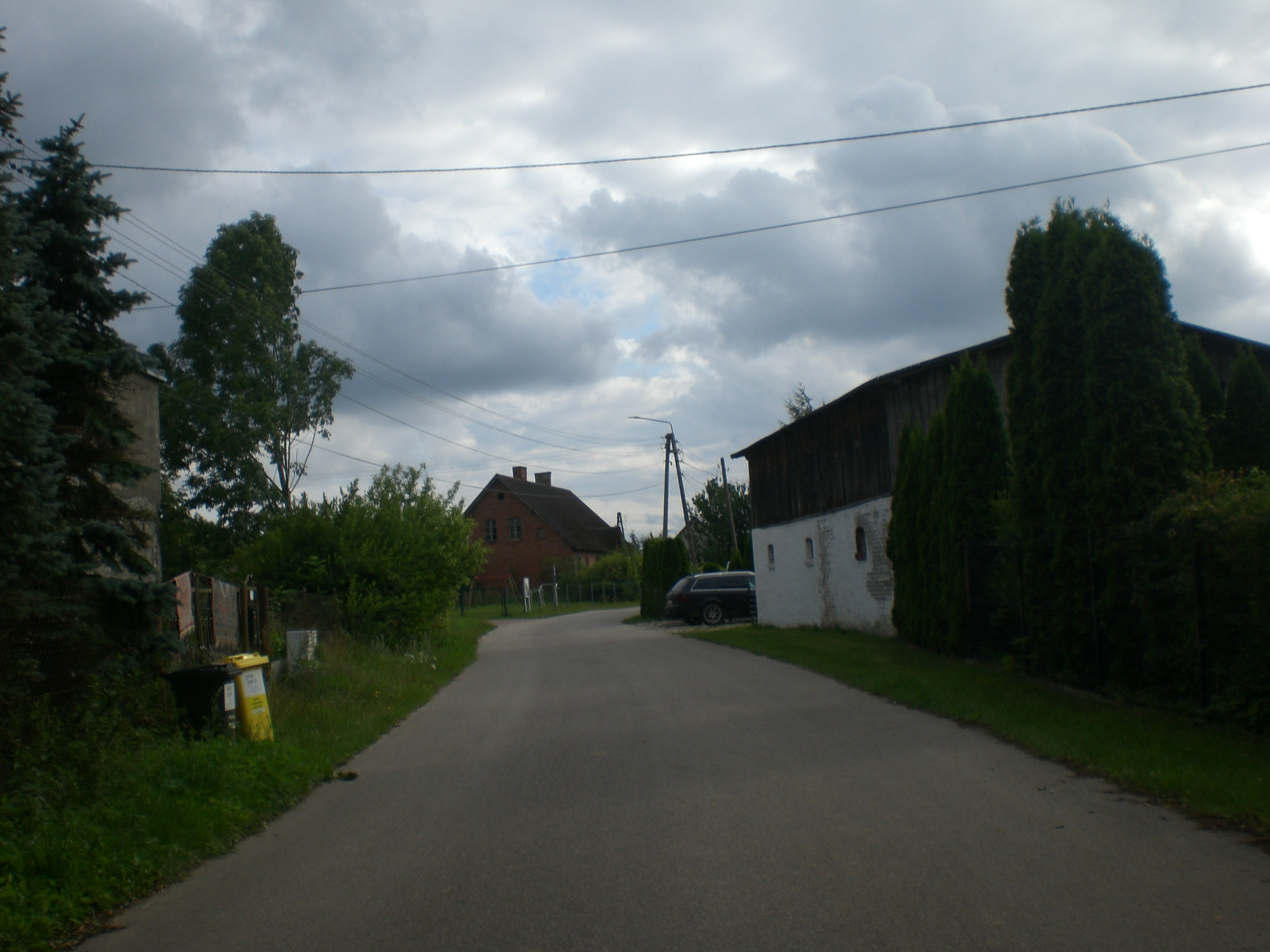

- Location within Poland
- Coordinates: 54°12′15″N 18°16′44″E
- Country: Poland
- Voivodeship: Pomeranian
- County: Gdańsk
- Gmina: Przywidz
- Population: 103

Stara Huta [ˈstara ˈxuta] is a village in the administrative district of Gmina Przywidz, within Gdańsk County, Pomeranian Voivodeship, in northern Poland.

For details of the history of the region, see History of Pomerania.
