= Borowina, Pomeranian Voivodeship =

Borowina
- Village
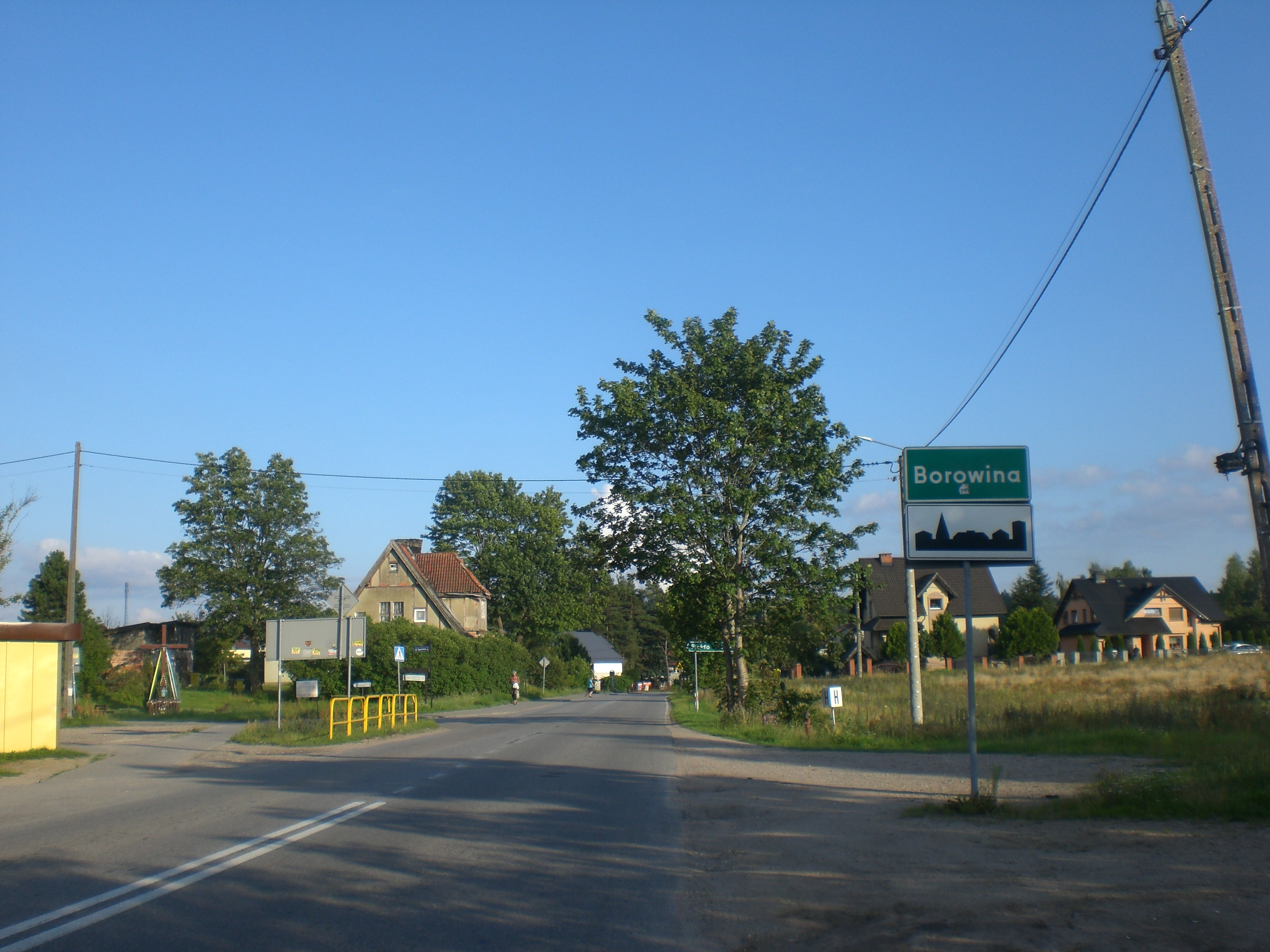

- Location within Poland
- Coordinates: 54°9′33″N 18°18′1″E
- Country: Poland
- Voivodeship: Pomeranian
- County: Gdańsk
- Gmina: Przywidz
- Population: 290

Borowina [bɔrɔˈvina] is a village in the administrative district of Gmina Przywidz, within Gdańsk County, Pomeranian Voivodeship, in northern Poland.

== History ==
For details of the early history of the region, see History of Pomerania, of Order Prussia, and of Royal Prussia.

Since 1466, when the rebels of the Prussian Confederation, partially successful in overthrowing the governing Teutonic Order, could only partition the western parts (Culmland, Pomerelia and Warmia) of Order Prussia, Borowina formed part of the Pomeranian Voivodeship in Polish-allied Royal Prussia. In 1772, in the course of the First Partition of Poland Borowina (Baarenhütte) became part of the Kingdom of Prussia. Borowina (Baarenhütte) then formed a municipality in the newly founded Preußisch Stargard District. With partitioning the Preußisch Stargard District into smaller districts in 1818, Baarenhütte became part of the new Berent District in the Danzig Region within West Prussia. In 1871 Barenhütte, with all of Prussia, became part of Germany. In 1910 Barenhütte counted 248 inhabitants.

Following the provisions of the Treaty of Versailles, the Barenhütte municipality, together with 14 other municipalities and manorial wards (Gutsbezirke) of the Berent District, was redistricted to the Danzig Heights District, and thus became part of the Free City of Danzig, a League of Nations mandate, in January 1920, more than a year after World War I. In 1929 Barenhütte counted 287 inhabitants.

After the German and Soviet Invasion of Poland, in 1939 Nazi Germany annexed the mandated Danzig territory in a unilaterally act, not recognised under international law, making also Barenhütte a part of the new Reichsgau Danzig-West Prussia, an occupational authority not recognised under international law. Within Danzig-West Prussia Barenhütte became part of the new Rural district of Danzig for the period until the end of World War II.

By the end of the war, in early 1945, the Red Army conquered and occupied the area. In summer 1945, following the provisions of the Potsdam Agreement, the Soviet occupation forces handed over Barenhütte, like all of the mandated Danzig territory, to Polish forces. The Polish administration renamed Barenhütte as Borowina. As far as mandate Danzig nationals of German ethnicity had not fled the Soviet invasion, most of them were expelled in the following years.
