= Bystra-Osiedle =

- Village
- Location within Poland
- Coordinates: 54°17′2″N 18°44′49″E
- Country: Poland
- Voivodeship: Pomeranian
- County: Gdańsk
- Gmina: Pruszcz Gdański
- Population: 320
- Website: http://www.bystra.boo.pl

Bystra-Osiedle [ˈbɨstra ɔˈɕɛdlɛ] is a village in the administrative district of Gmina Pruszcz Gdański, within Gdańsk County, Pomeranian Voivodeship, in northern Poland.

For details of the history of the region, see History of Pomerania.
