= Będzieszyn, Gdańsk County =

Będzieszyn
- Village
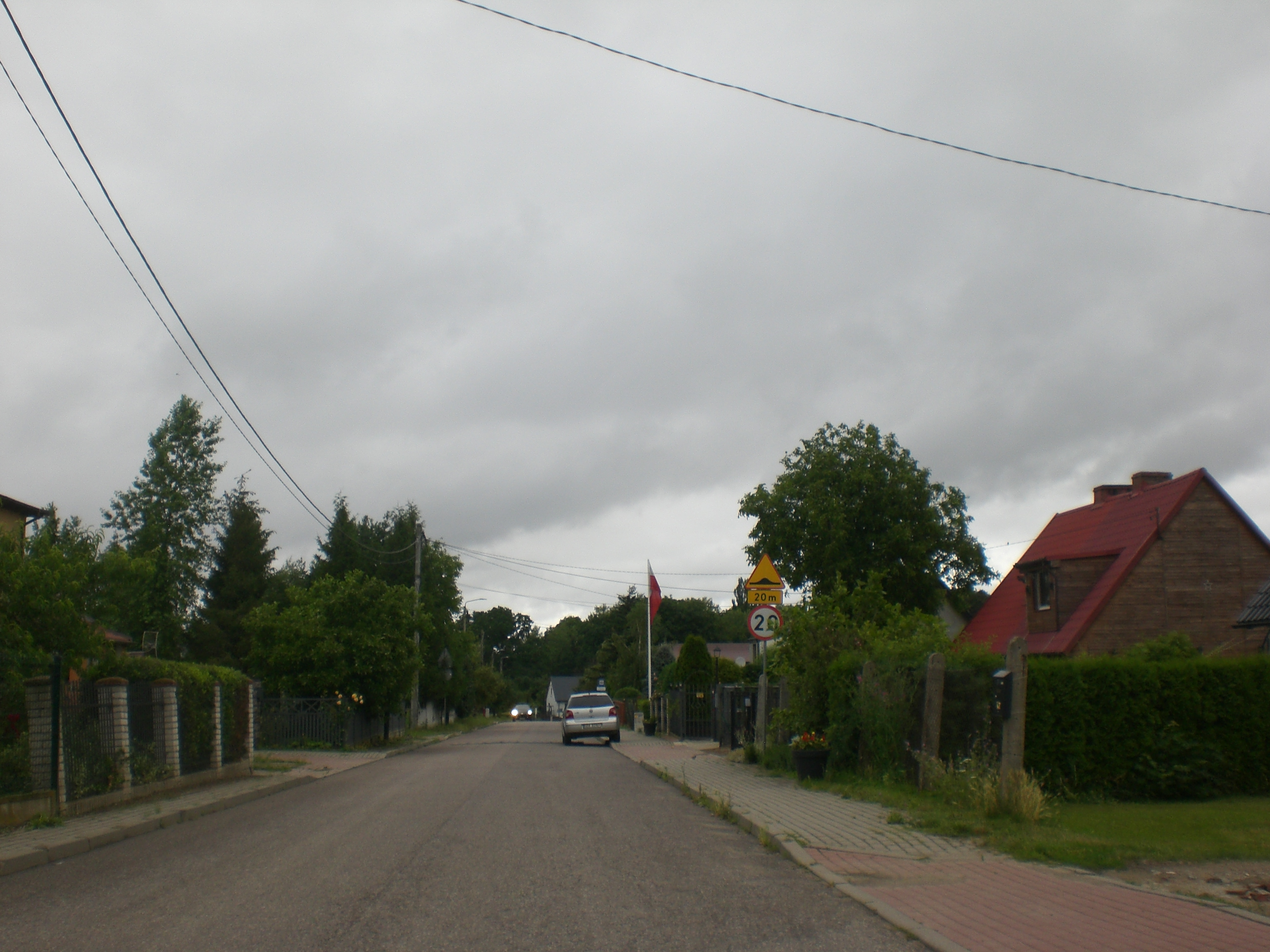

- Location within Poland
- Coordinates: 54°14′35″N 18°35′44″E
- Country: Poland
- Voivodeship: Pomeranian
- County: Gdańsk
- Gmina: Pruszcz Gdański

Population
  - Total: 196
- Time zone: UTC+1 (CET)
  - Summer (DST): UTC+2 (CEST)
- Postal code: 83-000
- Vehicle registration: GDA

Będzieszyn [bɛnˈd͡ʑɛʂɨn] is a village in the administrative district of Gmina Pruszcz Gdański, within Gdańsk County, Pomeranian Voivodeship, in northern Poland.

== History ==
The territory formed part of Poland until the Teutonic occupation in c. 1308. It was regained by Poland during the Thirteen Years' War (1454–1466). Afterwards it formed part of the Pomeranian Voivodeship in the province Royal Prussia in the larger Greater Poland Province.

In 1772, in the course of the First Partition of Poland Będzieszyn (aka Bendieszin) became part of the Kingdom of Prussia. Bendieszin then formed a manorial ward in the newly founded District of Dirschau. With partitioning Dirschau District in smaller districts in 1818, Bendieszin formed part of the new Danzig-Land District in the Danzig Region within West Prussia. In 1871 Bangschin, with all of Prussia, became part of Germany. In 1887, on partitioning Danzig-Land, Bangschin became part of the new Danzig Heights District. In 1910 Bangschin counted 174 inhabitants.

Following the provisions of the Treaty of Versailles, the Bangschin manorial ward, together with most of the Danzig Heights District, became part of the Free City of Danzig, a League of Nations mandate, in January 1920, more than a year after World War I. In 1929, when the Senate of Danzig dissolved all manorial wards, assigning them to one or more adjacent municipalities or transforming them into municipalities of their own, Bangschin was assigned to Praust.

After the German and Soviet Invasion of Poland, in 1939 Nazi Germany annexed the Danzig territory in a unilateral act, not recognised under international law, and merged Bangschin in the new Gau Danzig-West Prussia, an occupational authority not recognised under international law. Bangschin became part of the occupational Rural district of Danzig for the period until the end of World War II. By the end of the war, in early 1945, the Red Army conquered and occupied the area. In summer 1945, following the provisions of the Potsdam Agreement, the Soviet occupation forces handed over Będzieszyn once again to Poland.
