= Gmina Przywidz =

Gmina Przywidz Przywidz Commune
- Gmina
- Coat of arms
- Interactive map of Gmina Przywidz
- Coordinates (Przywidz): 54°11′52″N 18°19′35″E
- Country: Poland
- Voivodeship: Pomeranian
- County: Gdańsk
- Seat: Przywidz

Area
  - Total: 129.62 km^{2} (50.05 sq mi)

Population (2006)
  - Total: 5,151
  - Density: 39.74/km^{2} (102.9/sq mi)
- Website: http://www.przywidz.pl

Gmina Przywidz is a rural gmina (administrative district) in Gdańsk County, Pomeranian Voivodeship, in northern Poland. Its seat is the village of Przywidz, which lies approximately 22 kilometres (14 mi) west of Pruszcz Gdański and 28 km (17 mi) south-west of the regional capital Gdańsk.

The gmina covers an area of 129.62 square kilometres (50.0 sq mi), and as of 2006 its total population is 5,151.

== Villages ==
Gmina Przywidz contains the villages and settlements of Bliziny, Borowina, Czarna Huta, Częstocin, Gromadzin, Huta Dolna, Huta Górna, Jodłowno, Katarynki, Kierzkowo, Klonowo Dolne, Klonowo Górne, Kozia Góra, Łąkie, Majdany, Marszewo, Marszewska Góra, Marszewska Kolonia, Michalin, Miłowo, Nowa Wieś Przywidzka, Olszanka, Piekło Dolne, Piekło Górne, Pomlewo, Przywidz, Roztoka, Stara Huta, Sucha Huta, Szklana Góra, Trzepowo, Ząbrsko Dolne and Ząbrsko Górne.

== Neighbouring gminas ==
Gmina Przywidz is bordered by the gminas of Kolbudy, Nowa Karczma, Skarszewy, Somonino, Trąbki Wielkie and Żukowo.
