= Arciszewo, Pomeranian Voivodeship =

Arciszewo
- Village
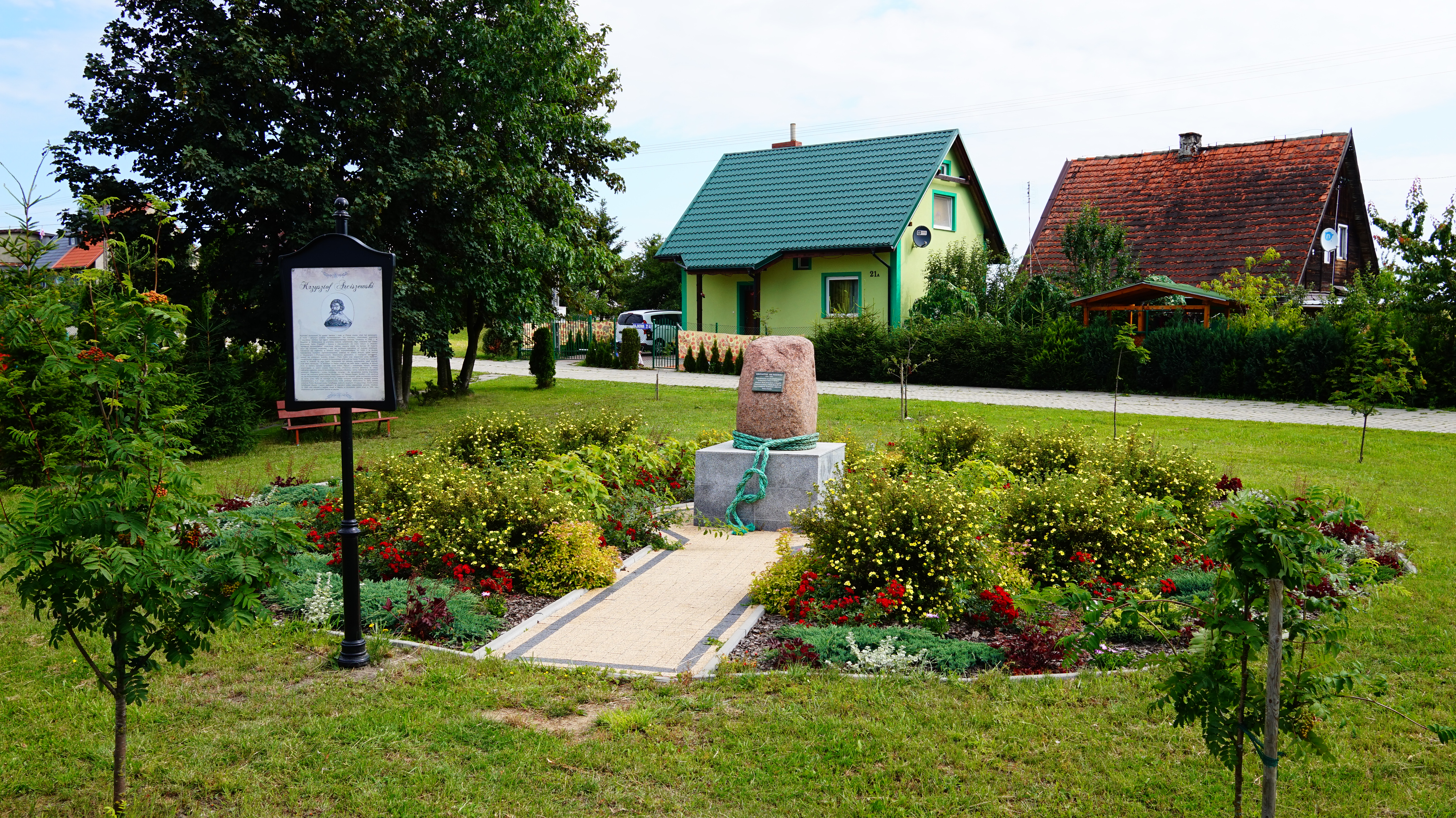
- Memorial to Krzysztof Arciszewski

- Location within Poland
- Coordinates: 54°15′36″N 18°33′44″E
- Country: Poland
- Voivodeship: Pomeranian
- County: Gdańsk
- Gmina: Pruszcz Gdański

Population
  - Total: 143
- Time zone: UTC+1 (CET)
  - Summer (DST): UTC+2 (CEST)
- Vehicle registration: GDA

Arciszewo [art͡ɕiˈʂɛvɔ] is a village in the administrative district of Gmina Pruszcz Gdański, within Gdańsk County, Pomeranian Voivodeship, in northern Poland.

== History ==
The territory became part of the emerging Polish state under Mieszko I in the 10th century. From the 14th century, it was occupied by the Teutonic Order. In 1454, it was reincorporated into the Kingdom of Poland by King Casimir IV Jagiellon, with the Teutonic Order renouncing claims in 1466. It was administratively located in the Pomeranian Voivodeship in the province of Royal Prussia in the Greater Poland Province of Poland. Polish names of the village were Arciszewo and Arczewo.

In 1772, in the course of the First Partition of Poland Arciszewo became part of the Kingdom of Prussia. Arciszewo (Artschau) then formed a manorial ward in the newly founded Kreis Dirschau. On partitioning Dirschau District into smaller districts in 1818, Artschau became part of the new Danzig-Land District in the Danzig Region within West Prussia. In 1871 Artschau, like all of Prussia, became part of Germany. In 1887, on partitioning Danzig-Land, Artschau became part of the new Danzig Heights District. In 1910 Artschau counted 103 inhabitants.

Following the provisions of the Treaty of Versailles, the Artschau manorial ward, together with most of the Danzig Heights District, became part of the Free City of Danzig, a League of Nations mandate in customs union with Poland, in January 1920, more than a year after World War I. In 1929, when the Senate of Danzig dissolved all manorial wards, assigning them to one or more adjacent municipalities or transforming them into municipalities of their own, Artschau merged with other manorial wards in the new municipality of Straschin-Prangschin.

After the German and Soviet Invasion of Poland, in 1939 Nazi Germany annexed the mandated Danzig area in a unilateral act, not recognised under international law, and merged Artschau in the new Danzig-West Prussia, an occupational authority not recognised under international law. Artschau became part of the new occupational Rural district of Danzig for the period until the end of World War II.

By the end of the war, in early 1945, the Red Army conquered and occupied the area. In summer 1945, following the provisions of the Potsdam Agreement, the Soviet occupation forces handed over Artschau, like all of the mandated Danzig territory, to Polish forces. The Polish administration renamed Artschau back to its historic Polish name Arciszewo. As far as mandate Danzig nationals of German ethnicity had not fled the Soviet invasion, most of them were expelled in the following years in accordance with the Potsdam Agreement.
