= Radunica =

- Village
- Location within Poland
- Coordinates: 54°16′47″N 18°39′23″E
- Country: Poland
- Voivodeship: Pomeranian
- County: Gdańsk
- Gmina: Pruszcz Gdański
- Population: 500

Radunica [raduˈnit͡sa] is a village in the administrative district of Gmina Pruszcz Gdański, within Gdańsk County, Pomeranian Voivodeship, in northern Poland.

For details of the history of the region, see History of Pomerania.
