= Weselno =

- Village
- Location within Poland
- Coordinates: 54°18′0″N 18°43′22″E
- Country: Poland
- Voivodeship: Pomeranian
- County: Gdańsk
- Gmina: Pruszcz Gdański
- Population: 80

Weselno [vɛˈsɛlnɔ] (German: Böttchergasse) is a village in the administrative district of Gmina Pruszcz Gdański, within Gdańsk County, Pomeranian Voivodeship, in northern Poland.
