= Wiślinka =

- Village
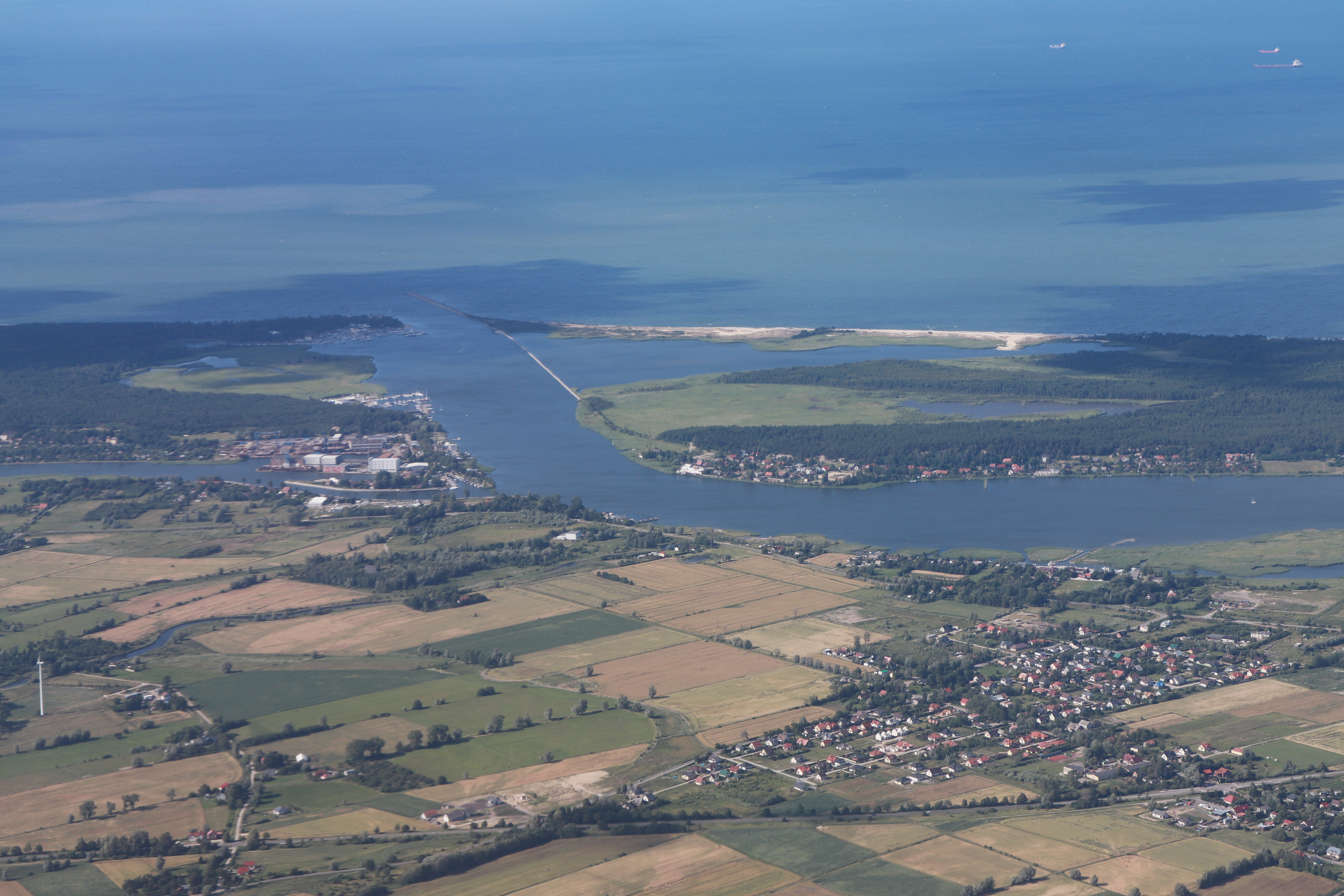
- Aerial view of the mouth of the Śmiała Wisła River with Wiślinka at the bottom right of the picture

- Location within Poland
- Coordinates: 54°20′18″N 18°48′7″E
- Country: Poland
- Voivodeship: Pomeranian
- County: Gdańsk
- Gmina: Pruszcz Gdański
- Population: 939
- Time zone: UTC+1 (CET)
  - Summer (DST): UTC+2 (CEST)
- Vehicle registration: GDA

Wiślinka [viˈɕlinka] (German: Wesselinken) is a village in the administrative district of Gmina Pruszcz Gdański, within Gdańsk County, Pomeranian Voivodeship, in northern Poland. It is located within the historic region of Pomerania.

During World War II it was the location of a subcamp of the Stutthof concentration camp, in which the Germans imprisoned around 50 people as forced labour.
