= Lędowo, Gdańsk County =

Lędowo
- Village
- Location within Poland
- Coordinates: 54°16′26″N 18°44′5″E
- Country: Poland
- Voivodeship: Pomeranian
- County: Gdańsk
- Gmina: Pruszcz Gdański
- Population: 233

Lędowo [lɛnˈdɔvɔ] is a village in the administrative district of Gmina Pruszcz Gdański, within Gdańsk County, Pomeranian Voivodeship, in northern Poland.

For details of the history of the region, see History of Pomerania.

There is a small ethnographic exhibition in a 19th-century renovated school building. The exhibition shows local furnitures and clothes of the 17th century.
