= Majdany, Pomeranian Voivodeship =

Majdany
- Village
- Location within Poland
- Coordinates: 54°14′29″N 18°17′46″E
- Country: Poland
- Voivodeship: Pomeranian
- County: Gdańsk
- Gmina: Przywidz
- Population: 50

Majdany (Polish pronunciation: [majˈdanɨ]) is a village in the administrative district of Gmina Przywidz, within Gdańsk County, Pomeranian Voivodeship, in northern Poland.

For details of the history of the region, see History of Pomerania.
