= Przywidz, Pomeranian Voivodeship =

Przywidz
- Village
- Location within Poland
- Coordinates: 54°11′52″N 18°19′35″E
- Country: Poland
- Voivodeship: Pomeranian
- County: Gdańsk
- Gmina: Przywidz
- Population: 1,673

Przywidz ([ˈpʂɨvit͡s], German: Mariensee) is a village in Gdańsk County, Pomeranian Voivodeship, in northern Poland. It is the seat of the gmina (administrative district) called Gmina Przywidz.
