= Borzęcin, Pomeranian Voivodeship =

Borzęcin
- Village
- Location within Poland
- Coordinates: 54°14′45″N 18°34′25″E
- Country: Poland
- Voivodeship: Pomeranian
- County: Gdańsk
- Gmina: Pruszcz Gdański
- Population: 42

Borzęcin [bɔˈʐɛnt͡ɕin] is a village in the administrative district of Gmina Pruszcz Gdański, within Gdańsk County, Pomeranian Voivodeship, in northern Poland.

For details of the history of the region, see History of Pomerania.
