= Otomin =

- Village
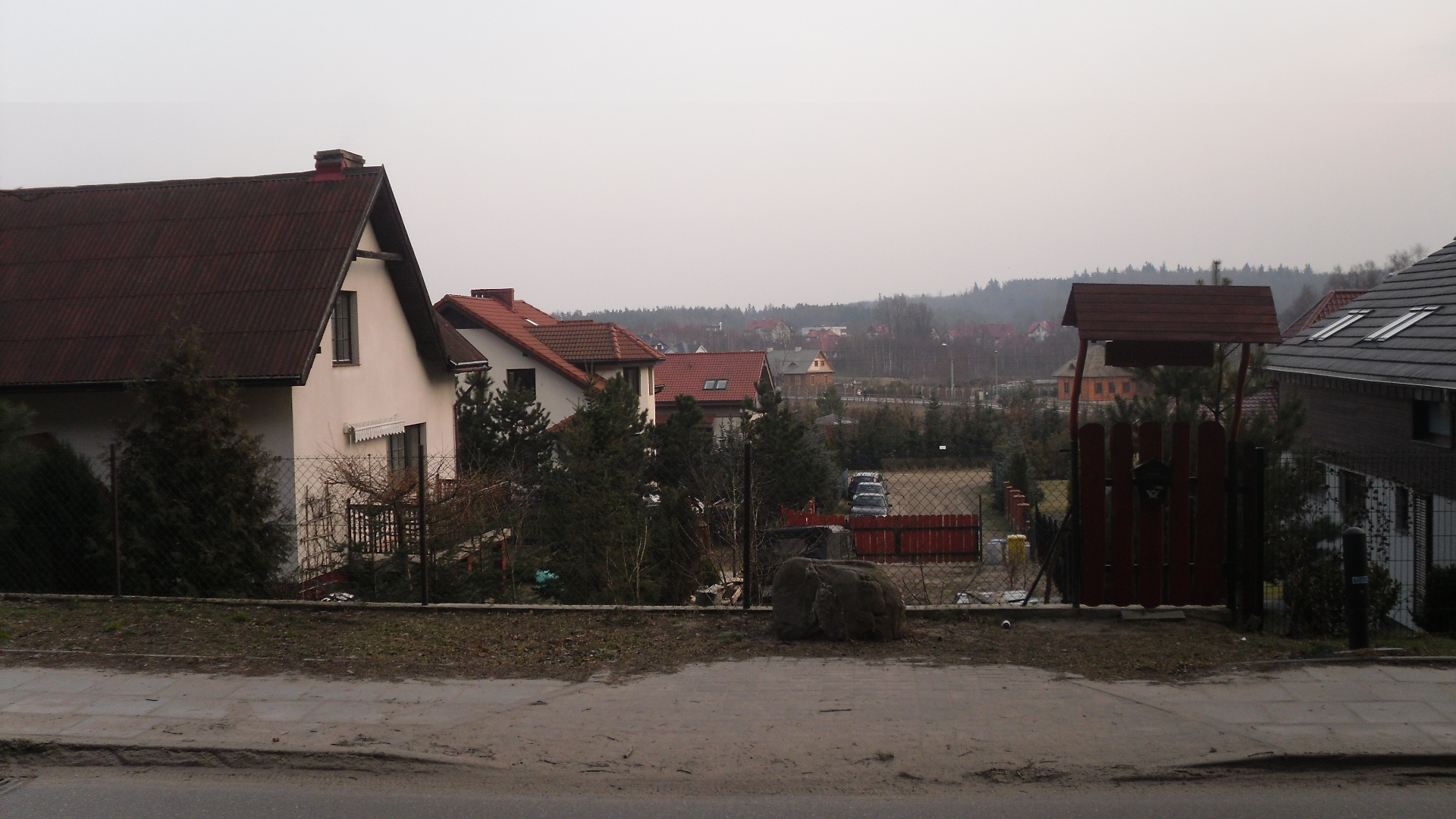

- Location within Poland
- Coordinates: 54°19′24″N 18°30′49″E
- Country: Poland
- Voivodeship: Pomeranian
- County: Gdańsk
- Gmina: Kolbudy
- Population: 726

Otomin [ɔˈtɔmin] is a village in the administrative district of Gmina Kolbudy, within Gdańsk County, Pomeranian Voivodeship, in northern Poland.

For details of the history of the region, see History of Pomerania.
