= Rusocin, Pomeranian Voivodeship =

Rusocin
- Village
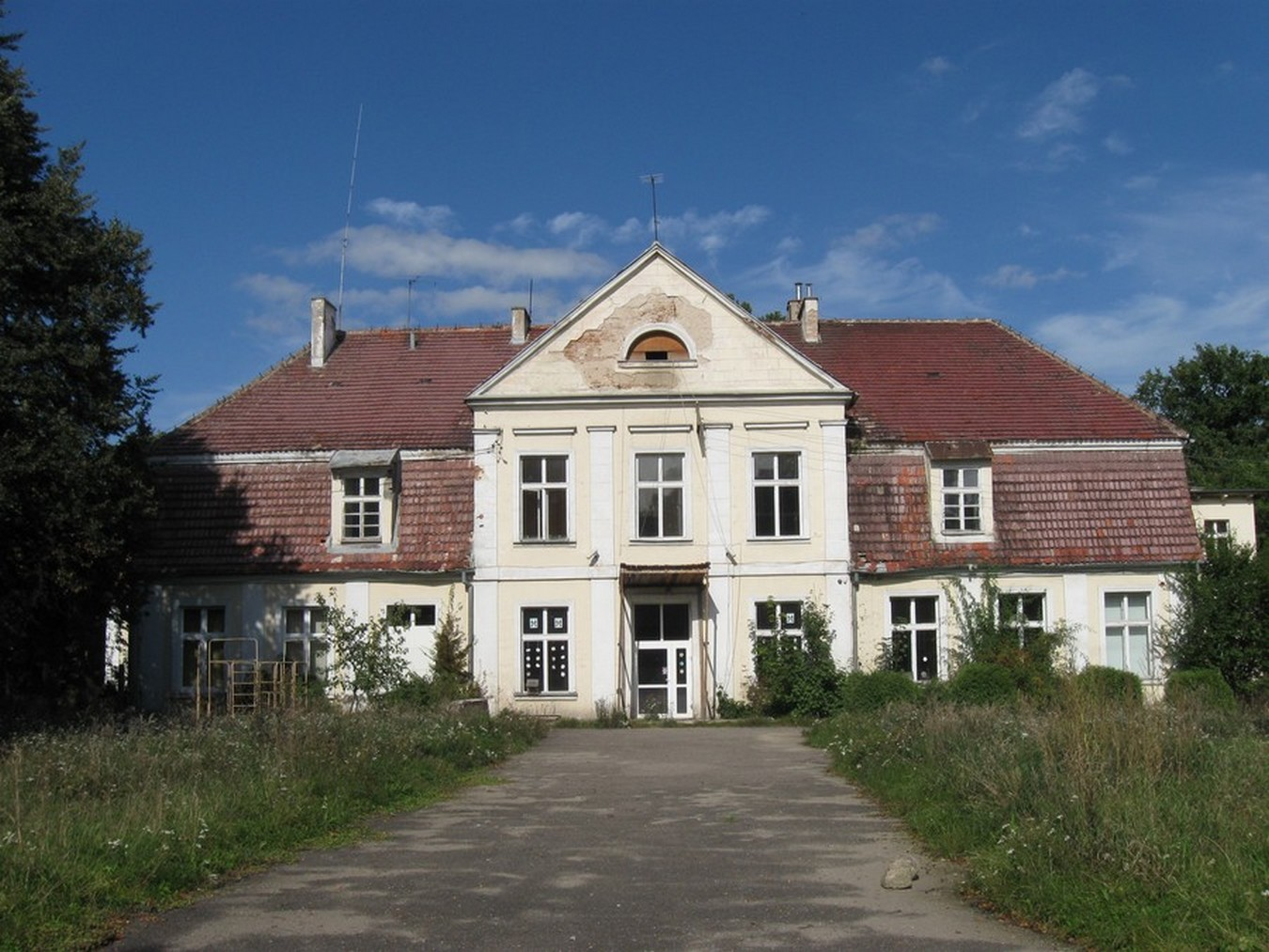
- Manor in the village

- Location within Poland
- Coordinates: 54°13′42″N 18°37′35″E
- Country: Poland
- Voivodeship: Pomeranian
- County: Gdańsk
- Gmina: Pruszcz Gdański

Population
  - Total: 980
- Time zone: UTC+1 (CET)
  - Summer (DST): UTC+2 (CEST)
- Vehicle registration: GDA
- Website: http://www.rusocin.80.pl

Rusocin [ruˈsɔt͡ɕin] is a village in the administrative district of Gmina Pruszcz Gdański, within Gdańsk County, Pomeranian Voivodeship, in northern Poland. It is located within the historic region of Pomerania.

== History ==
Rusocin was a private village owned by various Polish nobles, incl. the Dąbrowski and Wojanowski families, administratively located in the Tczew County in the Pomeranian Voivodeship of the Kingdom of Poland. It was annexed by Prussia in the First Partition of Poland in 1772.

During World War II, from September 1944 to February 1945, the village was the location of a subcamp of the Stutthof concentration camp, in which Nazi Germans imprisoned around 300 Jewish women as forced labour.

== Transport ==
The village is located close to the start/end point of the A1 and S6 highways.
