= Klonowo Dolne =

- Village
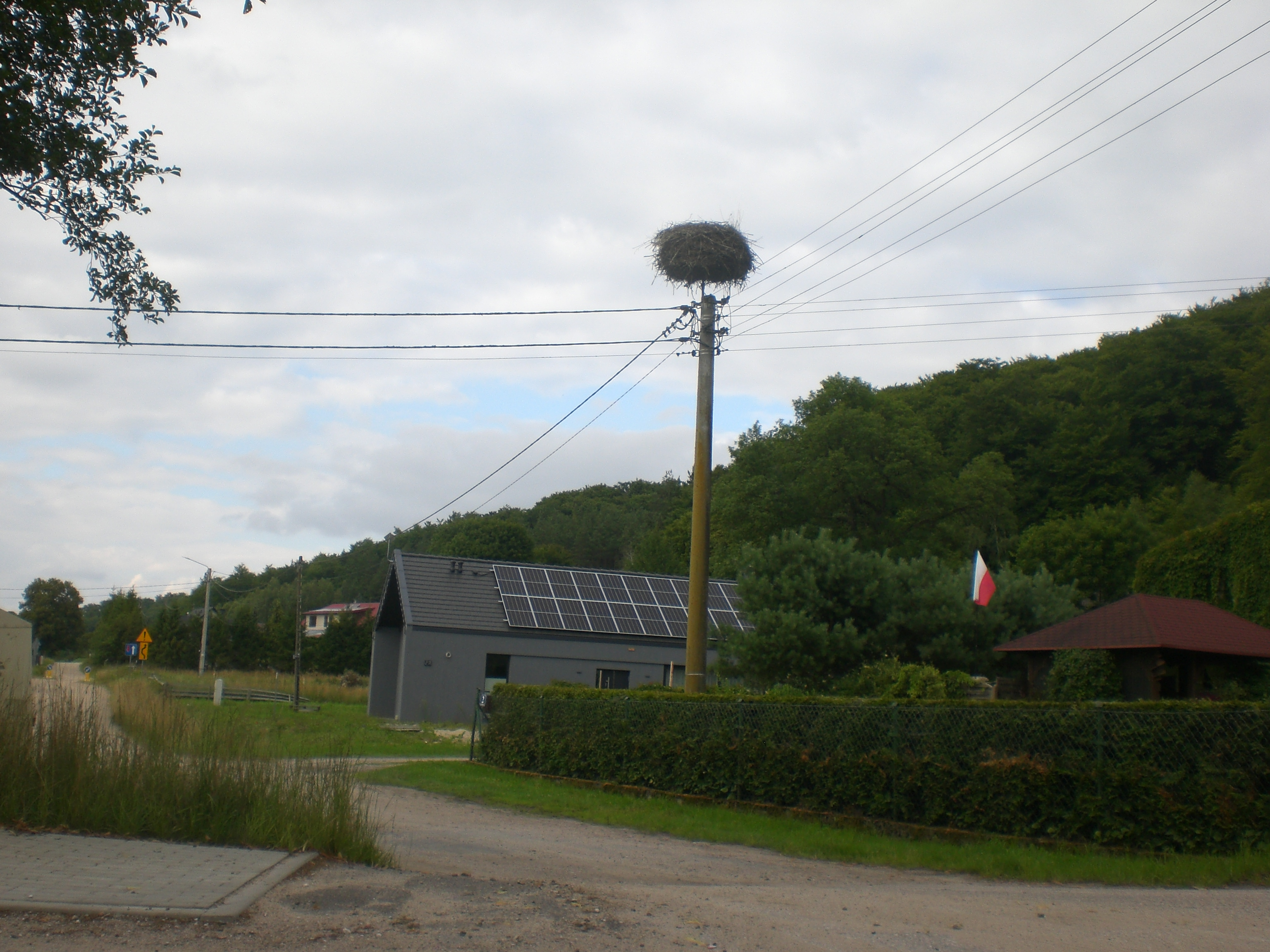

- Location within Poland
- Coordinates: 54°12′26″N 18°18′5″E
- Country: Poland
- Voivodeship: Pomeranian
- County: Gdańsk
- Gmina: Przywidz
- Population: 126

Klonowo Dolne [klɔˈnɔvɔ ˈdɔlnɛ] is a village in the administrative district of Gmina Przywidz, within Gdańsk County, Pomeranian Voivodeship, in northern Poland.

For details of the history of the region, see History of Pomerania.
