= Rotmanka, Gdańsk County =

Rotmanka
- Settlement
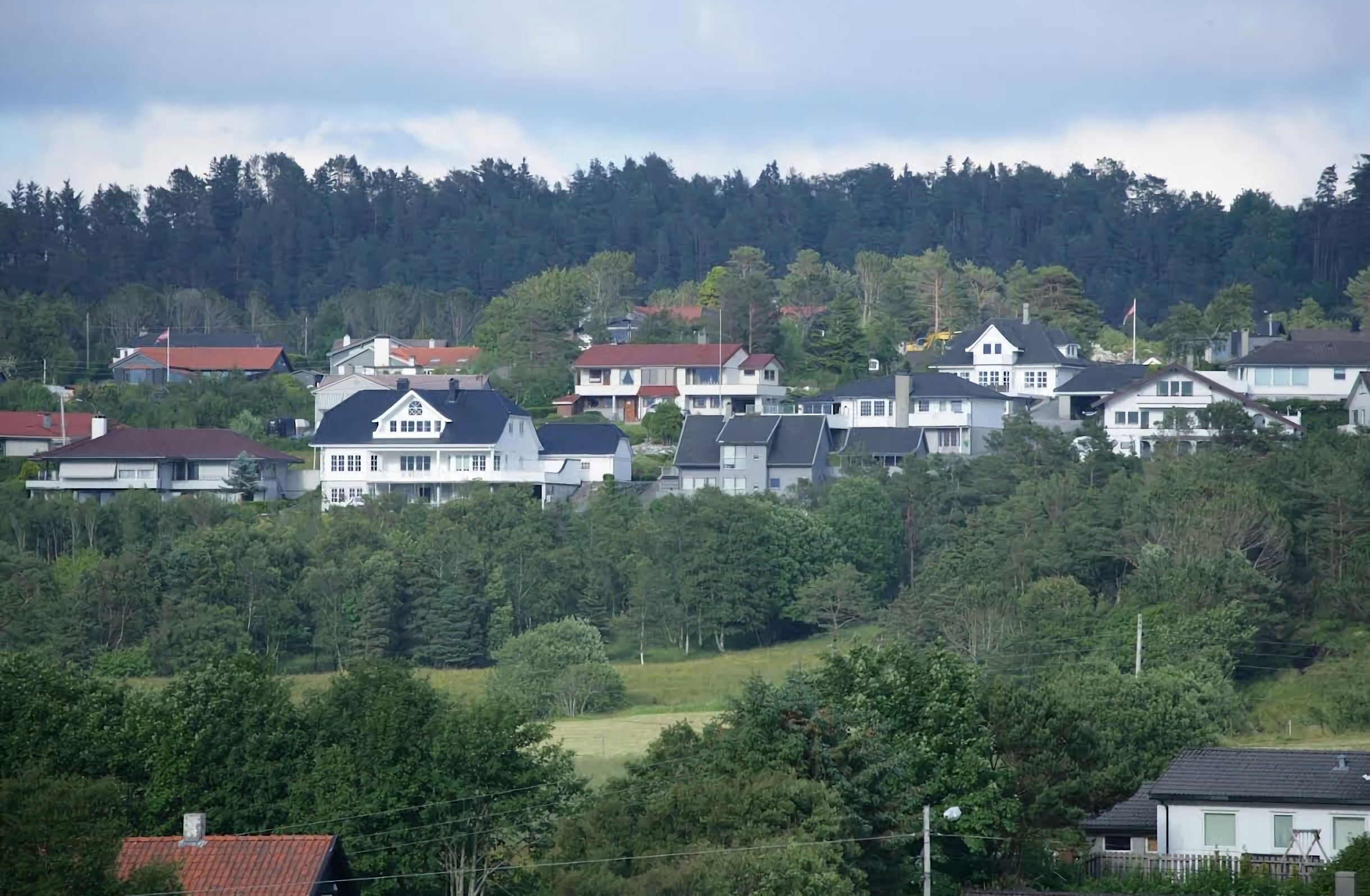

- Location within Poland
- Coordinates: 54°16′18″N 18°36′24″E
- Country: Poland
- Voivodeship: Pomeranian
- County: Gdańsk
- Gmina: Pruszcz Gdański

Population
  - Total: 1,782
- Time zone: UTC+1 (CET)
  - Summer (DST): UTC+2 (CEST)
- Vehicle registration: GDA

Rotmanka [rɔtˈmanka] is a settlement in the administrative district of Gmina Pruszcz Gdański, within Gdańsk County, Pomeranian Voivodeship, in northern Poland. It borders with the village of Kowale to west, Borkowo to north and Pruszcz Gdański to east.

Historical population
Year	Pop.	±%
1869	119	—
1885	199	+67.2%
