= Pomlewo =

- Village
- Location within Poland
- Coordinates: 54°13′7″N 18°21′28″E
- Country: Poland
- Voivodeship: Pomeranian
- County: Gdańsk
- Gmina: Przywidz

Population
  - Total: 435
- Time zone: UTC+1 (CET)
  - Summer (DST): UTC+2 (CEST)
- Vehicle registration: GDA

Pomlewo [pɔmˈlɛvɔ] is a village in the administrative district of Gmina Przywidz, within Gdańsk County, Pomeranian Voivodeship, in northern Poland.

== History ==
Pomlewo was a private village of Polish nobility, administratively located in the Tczew County in the Pomeranian Voivodeship of the Kingdom of Poland.

During the German occupation of Poland (World War II), in August 1944, the Germans formed the AGSSt 34 assembly camp for Allied prisoners of war. In November 1944, it was relocated to Tarnów.
