= Żukczyn =

- Village
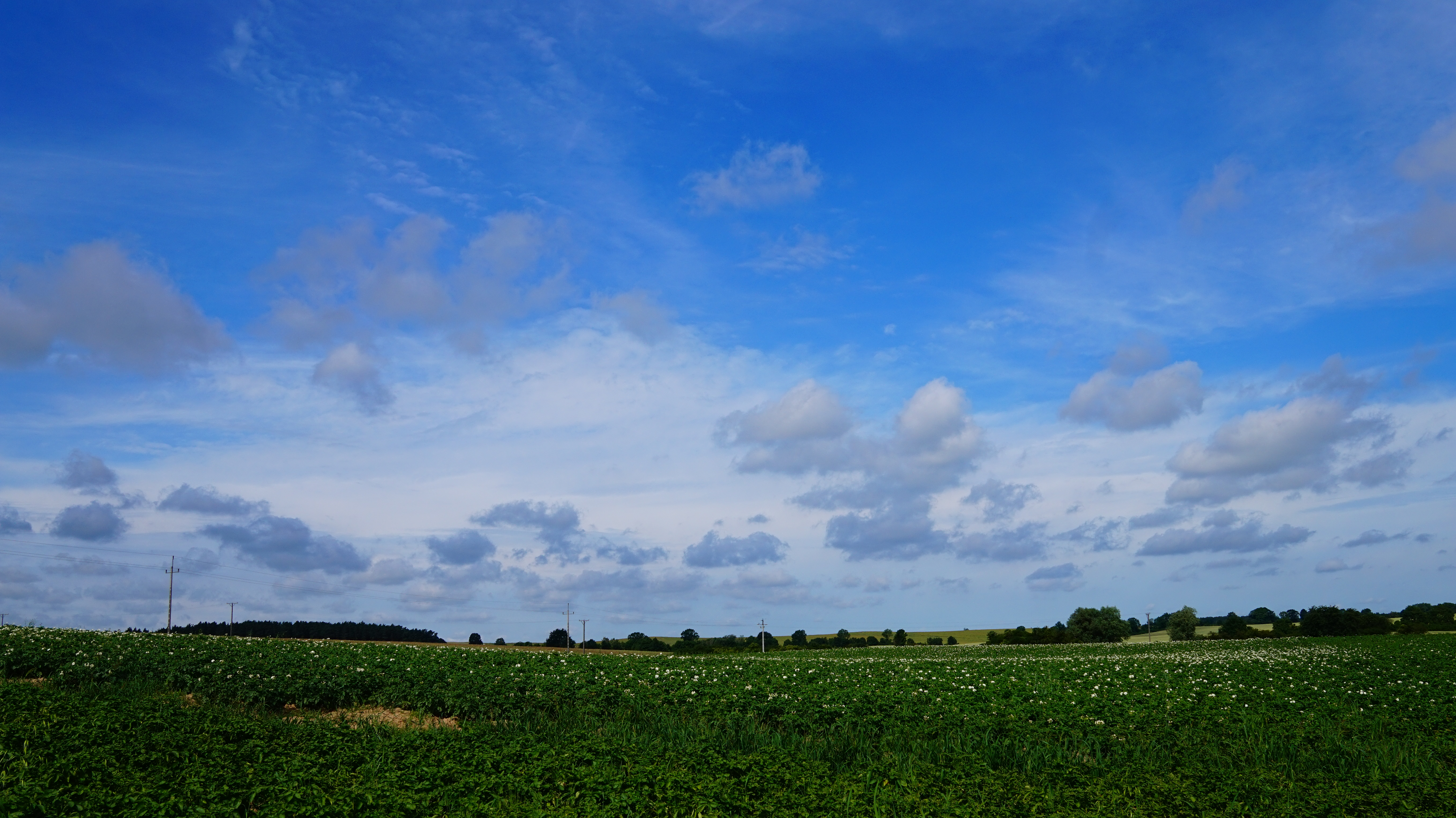

- Location within Poland
- Coordinates: 54°12′46″N 18°36′20″E
- Country: Poland
- Voivodeship: Pomeranian
- County: Gdańsk
- Gmina: Pruszcz Gdański
- Population: 315
- Time zone: UTC+1 (CET)
  - Summer (DST): UTC+2 (CEST)
- Vehicle registration: GDA

Żukczyn [ˈʐukt͡ʂɨn] is a village in the administrative district of Gmina Pruszcz Gdański, within Gdańsk County, Pomeranian Voivodeship, in northern Poland. It is located within the historic region of Pomerania.

== History ==
The settlement dates back to prehistoric times and there are three archaeological sites (two settlements and a cemetery) from the Iron Age in Żukczyn.

It was the site of an early medieval settlement, which is also an archaeological site. It became part of the emerging Polish state under Poland's first historic ruler Mieszko I in the 10th century.

Żukczyn was a private church village of the monastery in Oliwa, administratively located in the Tczew County in the Pomeranian Voivodeship of the Polish Crown.

== Transport ==
The Polish A1 motorway runs through the village.
