= Częstocin =

- Village
- Location within Poland
- Coordinates: 54°11′30″N 18°14′23″E
- Country: Poland
- Voivodeship: Pomeranian
- County: Gdańsk
- Gmina: Przywidz
- Population: 132

Częstocin [t͡ʂɛ̃sˈtɔt͡ɕin] is a village in the administrative district of Gmina Przywidz, within Gdańsk County, Pomeranian Voivodeship, in northern Poland.

For details of the history of the region, see History of Pomerania.
