= Ostatni Grosz, Pomeranian Voivodeship =

Ostatni Grosz
- Settlement
- Location within Poland
- Coordinates: 54°19′14″N 18°46′47″E
- Country: Poland
- Voivodeship: Pomeranian
- County: Gdańsk
- Gmina: Cedry Wielkie

Ostatni Grosz [ɔsˈtatni ˈɡrɔʂ] is a settlement in the administrative district of Gmina Cedry Wielkie, within Gdańsk County, Pomeranian Voivodeship, in northern Poland.

For details of the history of the region, see History of Pomerania.
