= Żuława, Pomeranian Voivodeship =

Żuława
- Village
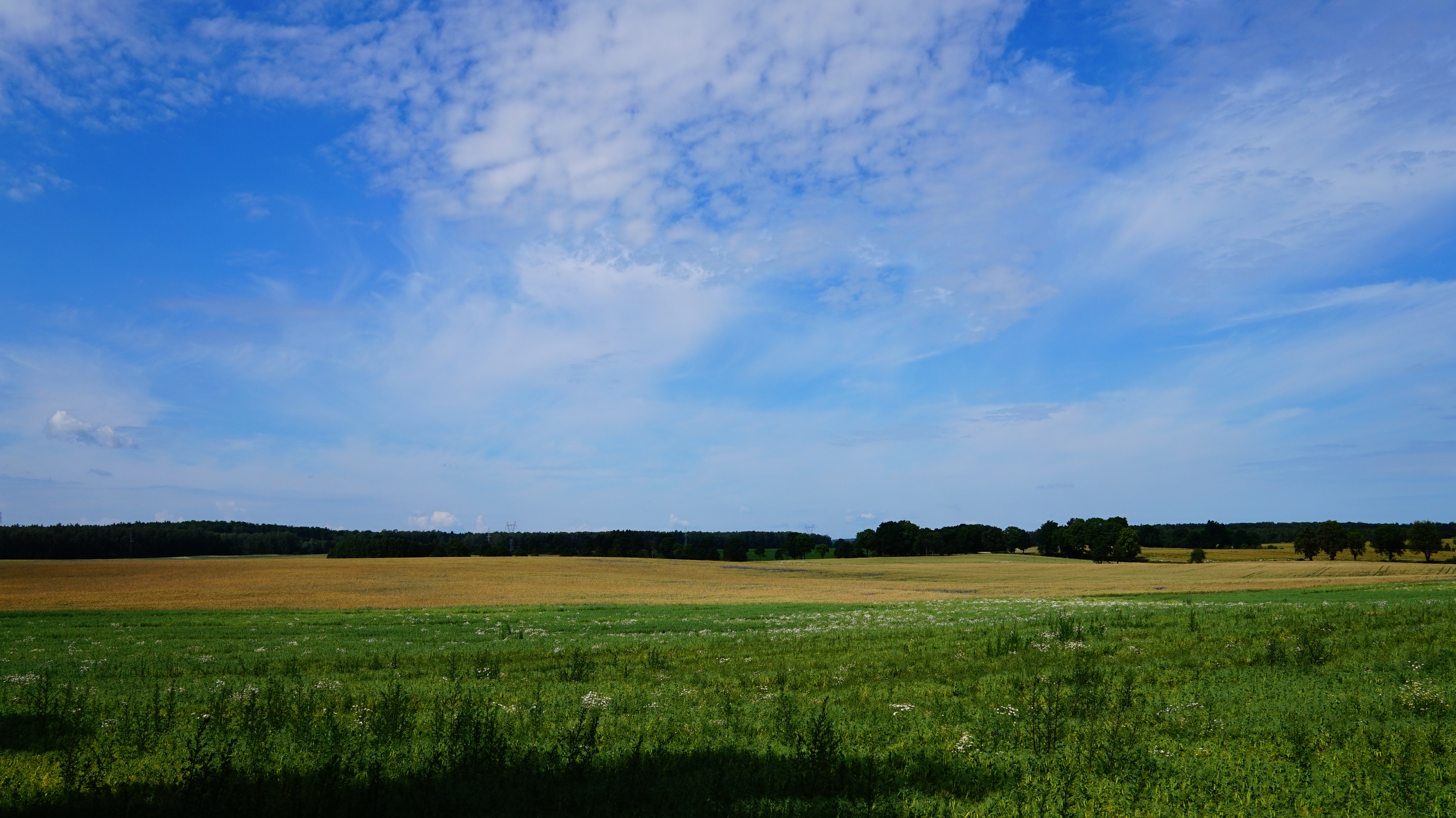

- Location within Poland
- Coordinates: 54°13′59″N 18°32′10″E
- Country: Poland
- Voivodeship: Pomeranian
- County: Gdańsk
- Gmina: Pruszcz Gdański

Population
  - Total: 272
- Time zone: UTC+1 (CET)
  - Summer (DST): UTC+2 (CEST)
- Vehicle registration: GDA

Żuława [ʐuˈwava] is a village in the administrative district of Gmina Pruszcz Gdański, within Gdańsk County, Pomeranian Voivodeship, in northern Poland.

== History ==
Żuława was a private village of Polish nobility, including the Bąkowski family, administratively located in the Gdańsk County in the Pomeranian Voivodeship of the Kingdom of Poland.
