= Łąkie, Gdańsk County =

Łąkie
- Settlement
- Location within Poland
- Coordinates: 54°10′21″N 18°14′14″E
- Country: Poland
- Voivodeship: Pomeranian
- County: Gdańsk
- Gmina: Przywidz
- Population: 103

Łąkie [ˈwɔnkʲɛ] is a settlement in the administrative district of Gmina Przywidz, within Gdańsk County, Pomeranian Voivodeship, in northern Poland.

For details of the history of the region, see History of Pomerania.
