= Roztoka, Pomeranian Voivodeship =

Roztoka
- Village
- Location within Poland
- Coordinates: 54°13′10″N 18°15′20″E
- Country: Poland
- Voivodeship: Pomeranian
- County: Gdańsk
- Gmina: Przywidz
- Population: 141

Roztoka [rɔsˈtɔka] is a village in the administrative district of Gmina Przywidz, within Gdańsk County, Pomeranian Voivodeship, in northern Poland.

For details of the history of the region, see History of Pomerania.
