= Jodłowno =

- Village
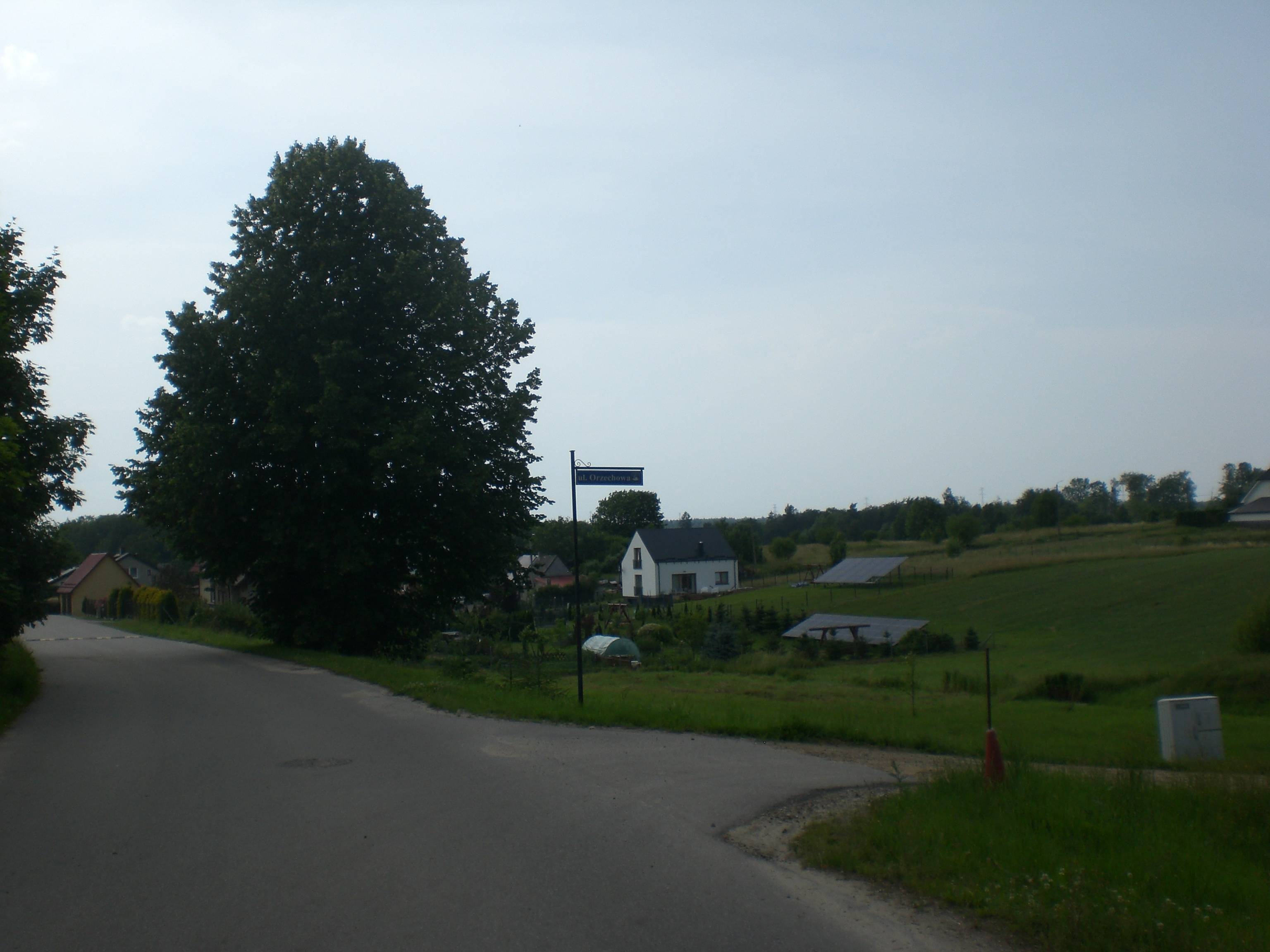

- Location within Poland
- Coordinates: 54°14′48″N 18°23′4″E
- Country: Poland
- Voivodeship: Pomeranian
- County: Gdańsk
- Gmina: Przywidz

Population
  - Total: 262
- Time zone: UTC+1 (CET)
  - Summer (DST): UTC+2 (CEST)
- Vehicle registration: GDA

Jodłowno [jɔdˈwɔvnɔ] is a village in the administrative district of Gmina Przywidz, within Gdańsk County, Pomeranian Voivodeship, in northern Poland.

== History ==
Jodłowno was a private village of Polish nobility, including the Jackowski family, administratively located in the Gdańsk County in the Pomeranian Voivodeship of the Kingdom of Poland.
