= Cieplewo =

- Village
- Location within Poland
- Coordinates: 54°14′3″N 18°39′1″E
- Country: Poland
- Voivodeship: Pomeranian
- County: Gdańsk
- Gmina: Pruszcz Gdański
- Population: 710
- Website: http://www.cieplewo.com

Cieplewo [t͡ɕɛˈplɛvɔ] is a village in the administrative district of Gmina Pruszcz Gdański, within Gdańsk County, Pomeranian Voivodeship, in northern Poland.
