= Borkowo Łostowickie =

- Village
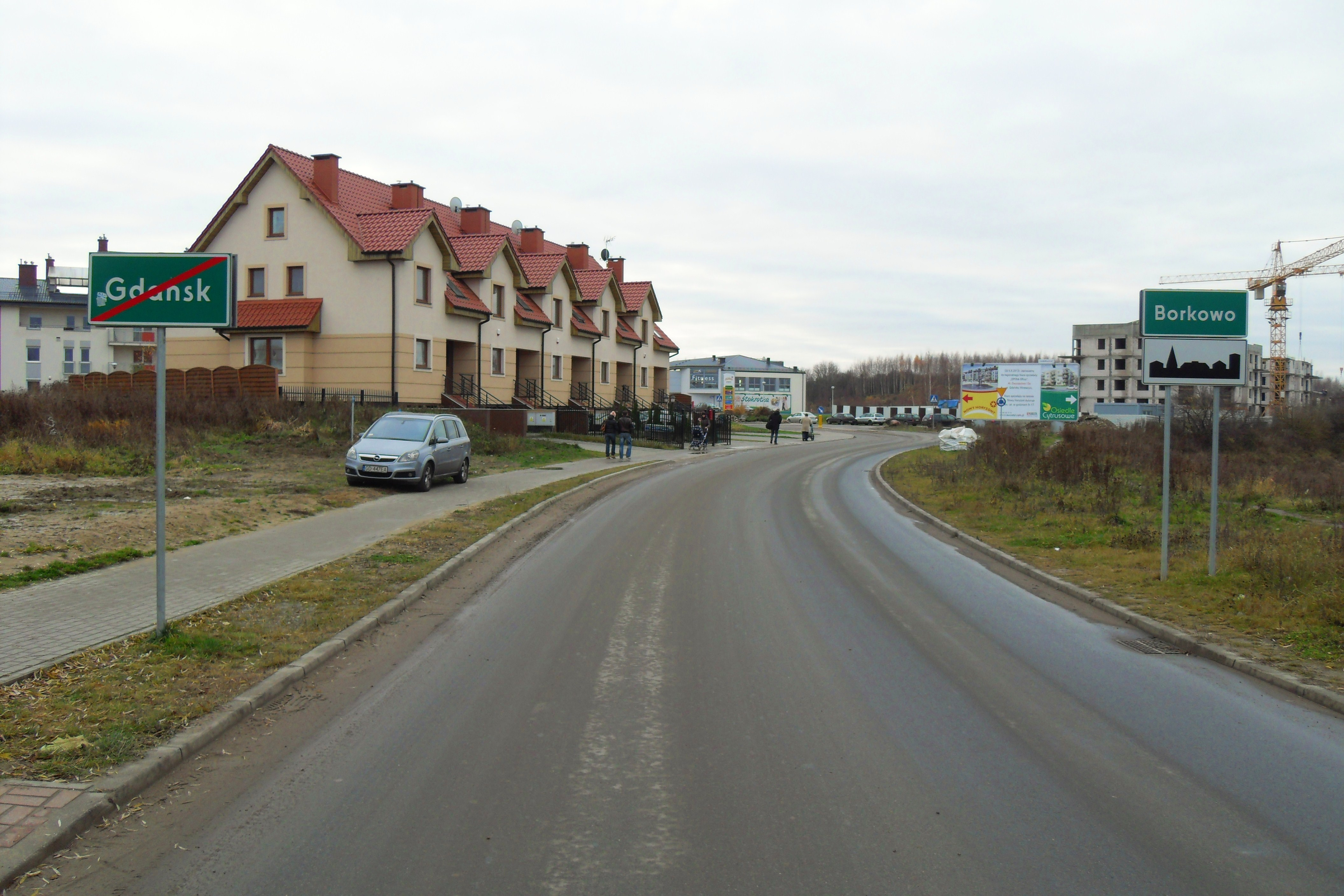

- Location within Poland
- Coordinates: 54°17′55″N 18°35′42″E
- Country: Poland
- Voivodeship: Pomeranian
- County: Gdańsk
- Gmina: Pruszcz Gdański
- Population: 507

Borkowo Łostowickie [bɔrˈkɔvɔ wɔstɔˈvit͡skʲɛ] is a village in the administrative district of Gmina Pruszcz Gdański, within Gdańsk County, Pomeranian Voivodeship, in northern Poland.

For details of the history of the region, see History of Pomerania.
