= Dariusz Drelich =

Voivode of Pomeranian Voivodeship

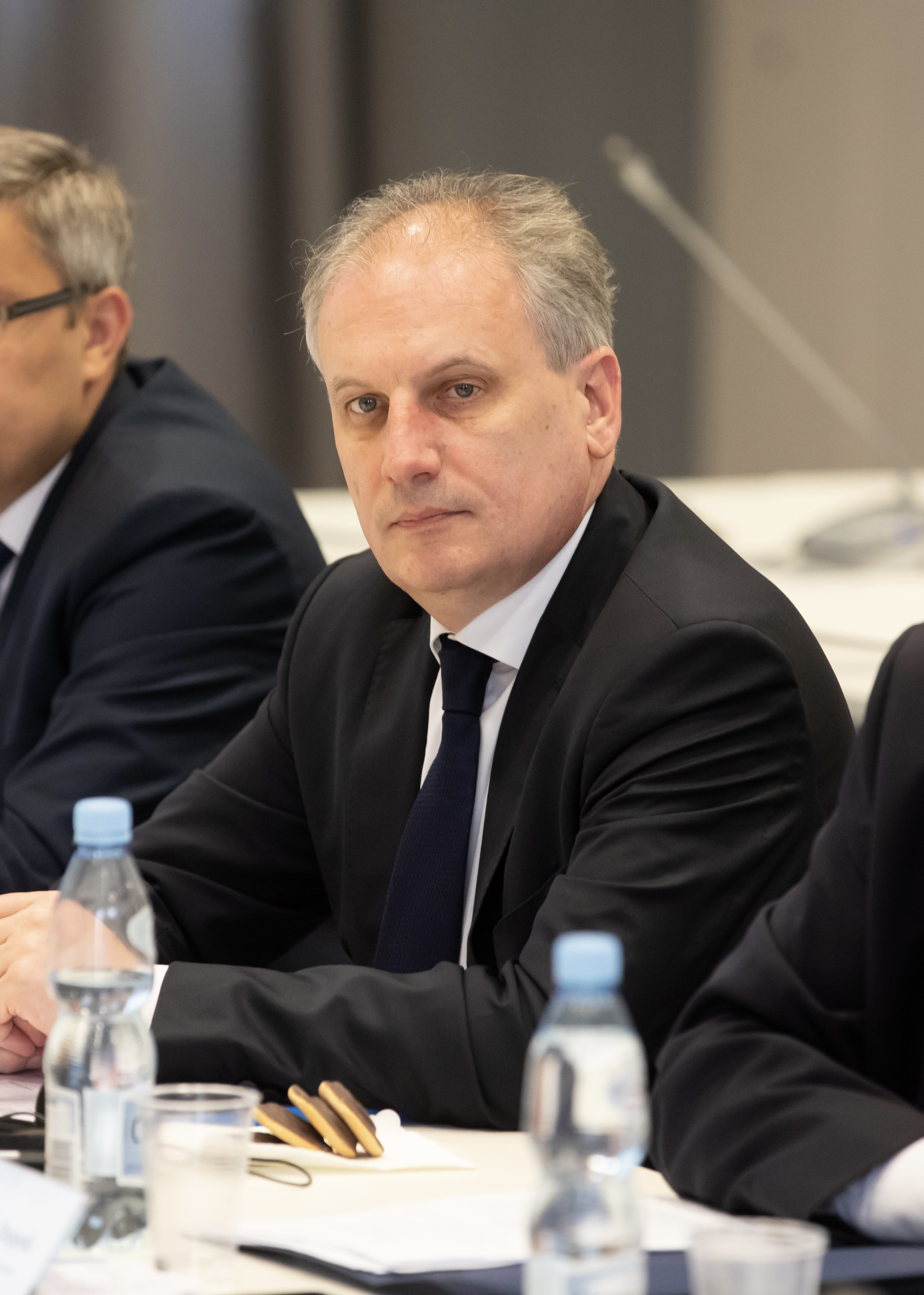
- Dariusz Drelich (2018)

Voivode of Pomeranian Voivodeship
- In office 8 December 2015 – 20 December 2023
- President: Andrzej Duda
- Prime Minister: Beata Szydło; Mateusz Morawiecki
- Preceded by: Ryszard Stachurski
- Succeeded by: Beata Rutkiewicz

Personal details
- Born: 10 July 1967 (age 59) Kolbudy, Poland
- Citizenship: Poland
- Party: Liberal Democratic Congress (1990–2005); Law and Justice (2005–present)
- Spouse: Małgorzata Drelich
- Children: Roma; Nina
- Education: University of Gdańsk
- Profession: Businessman, politician

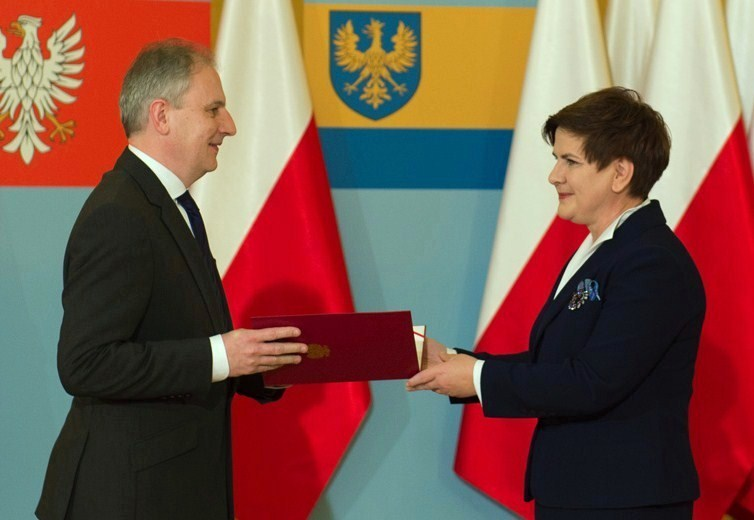
Dariusz Drelich being appointed voivode by Beata Szydło, 2015

Dariusz Drelich (born 10 July 1967) is a Polish businessman and politician that has served as Voivode of Pomeranian Voivodeship from 8 December 2015 to 20 December 2023.

== Biography ==
In the second half of the 1980s we was a member of a local council of the Patriotic Movement for National Rebirth, a Polish United Workers' Party-founded state propaganda organisation and the delegate for the voivodeship meeting of the PRON.

Dariusz Drelich was born on 10 July 1967 in Kolbudy, graduating in Organization and Management at the University of Gdańsk and completing post-graduate studies at the Gdańsk University of Technology and the WSB Merito University in Gdańsk.

He joined the Liberal Democratic Congress in 1990, a heavy proponent of Donald Tusk's ideas at the time, and was a councilman of Gmina Kolbudy from 1990 to 1994 and of Gdańsk County from 2014, as well as the representative of Law and Justice in Pomeranian Voivodeship, joining the party in 2005. He was appointed Voivode of Pomeranian Voivodeship on 8 December 2015 by Beata Szydło.

During his time as Voivode, Drelich experienced conflict with the majority liberal government of the voivodeship and thus limited or delayed most reforms suggested by the local government, causing his term in office to be rather controversial, an effect made worse by him implementing the reforms of his parent party, PiS. As a businessman, he co-founded the metal trade and manufacturing company POMKOL (Przesiębiorstwo Usługowo-Produkcyjno-Handlowe Pomkol sp. z o.o.) in January 2002 and is the active owner of the company.

== Personal life ==
He is married to Małgorzata Drelich and has two daughters: Roma and Nina, 23 and 11 years old respectively. He currently lives in Lublewo Gdańskie.
