= Bielkowo =

Bielkowo may refer to the following places:

- Bielkowo, Gdańsk County in Pomeranian Voivodeship (north Poland)
- Bielkowo, Koszalin County in West Pomeranian Voivodeship (north-west Poland)
- Bielkowo, Stargard County in West Pomeranian Voivodeship (north-west Poland)
- Bielkowo (PKP station)
