= Łapino railway station =

Railway station in Łapino, Poland

Coordinates: 54°17′30″N 18°26′51″E

Łapino
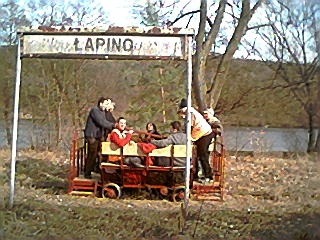
- A hand-powered draisine at Łapino railway station

General information
- Location: Łapino; Poland
- Owner: Polskie Koleje Państwowe S.A.
- Platforms: 2

Construction
- Structure type: Building: Yes (no longer used); Depot: Never existed Water tower: Never existed

History
- Opened: 1886
- Former names: Lappin until 1945
Location

Łapino is a non-operational PKP railway station in Łapino (Pomeranian Voivodeship), Poland.

== Lines crossing the station ==
Start station	End station	Line type
Pruszcz Gdański	Łeba	Closed
