= Kolbudy railway station =

Railway station in Kolbudy, Poland

Coordinates: 54°16′08″N 18°27′54″E

Kolbudy
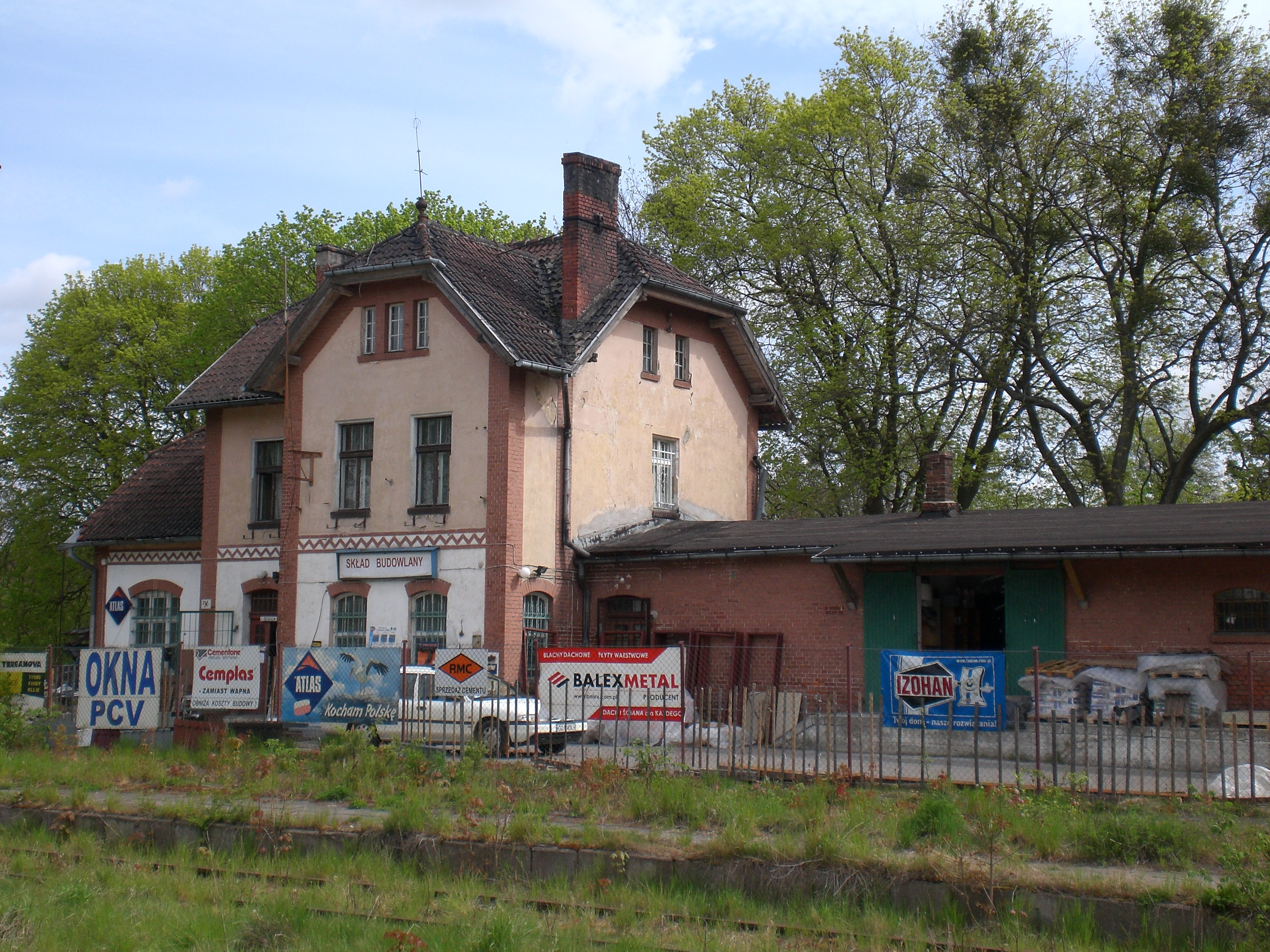

General information
- Location: Kolbudy; Poland
- Owner: Polskie Koleje Państwowe S.A.
- Platforms: 2

Construction
- Structure type: Building: Yes (no longer used); Depot: Never existed Water tower: Never existed

History
- Opened: 1886
- Former names: Kahlbude until 1944; Wapniewo; 1944-1945
Location

Kolbudy is a non-operational PKP railway station in Kolbudy (Pomeranian Voivodeship), Poland. Station was closed on May 29, 1994.

== Lines crossing the station ==
Start station	End station	Line type
Pruszcz Gdański	Łeba	Closed
