= Babka Tower =

Skyscraper in Warsaw, Poland

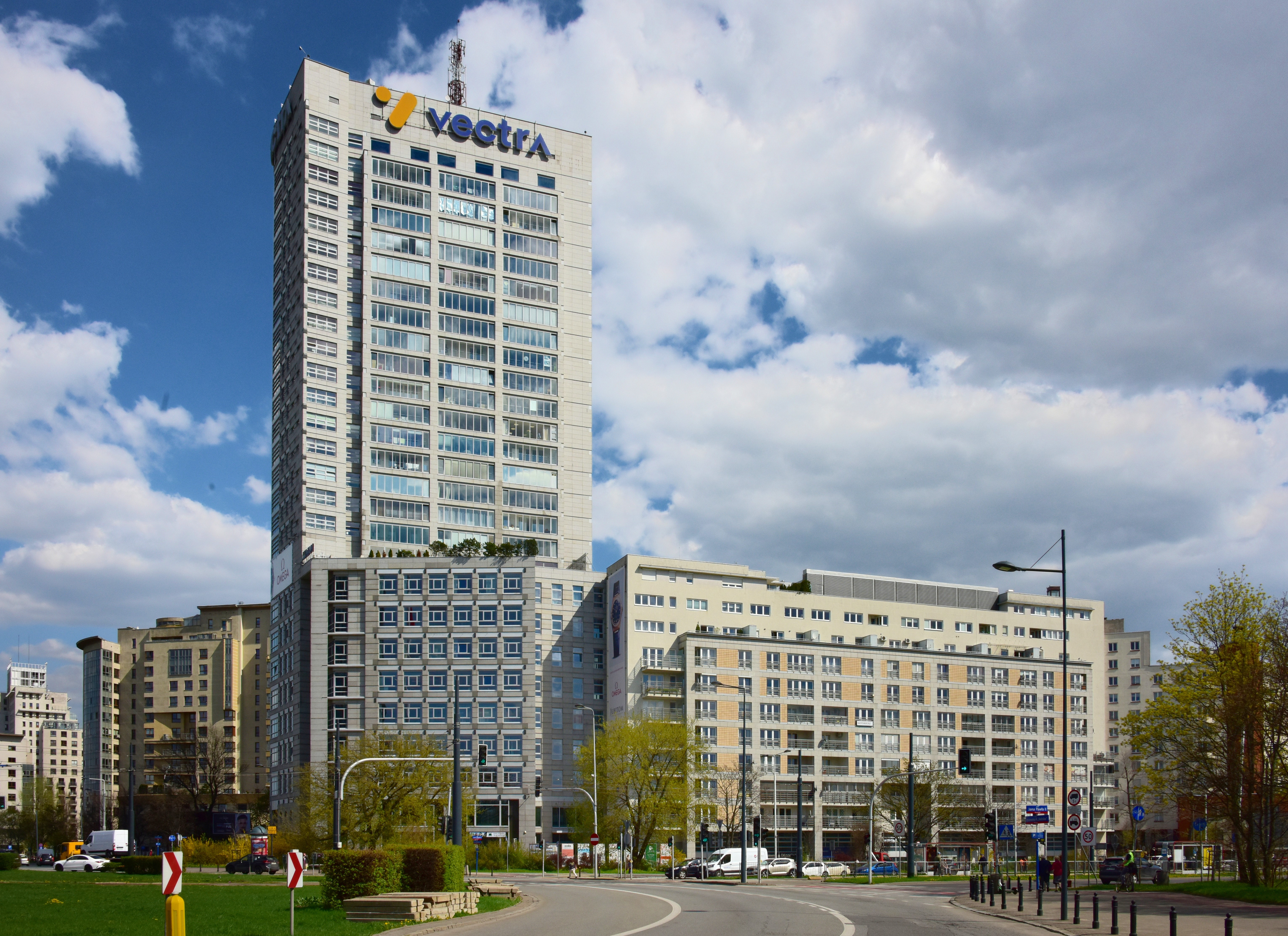
- Babka Tower as seen from the Radosław Group of the Home Army Roundabout.

General information
- Location: Downtown, Warsaw, Poland, 80 John Paul II Avenue
- Coordinates: 52°15′14″N 20°59′03″E
- Construction started: 1998
- Completed: 2001

Height
- Architectural: 105 m (344 ft)
- Roof: 96 m (315 ft)

Technical details
- Floor count: 28
- Floor area: 84,850 m^{2} (913,300 sq ft)

Design and construction
- Architecture firm: JEMS Architekci
- Developer: Echo Investment

Other information
- Number of suites: 196

Babka Tower (Polish: [ˈbap.ka]) is a residential and office skyscraper in the city of Warsaw, Poland. It is located at 80 John Paul II Avenue, in the neighbourhood of Muranów within the Downtown district. Designed by the architecture firm JEMS Architekci, it was completed in 2001. The building has 28 storeys, with a total height of 105 m (344 ft), and with a height to the roof measuring 96 m (315 ft). It has a total floor area of 84,850 m^{2} (913,300 sq ft). The building predominantly consists of luxury apartments, with 196 suites in total, also featuring office and service spaces, as well as housing some of the facilities of the VIZJA University.

== Name ==
The building was named after the nearby Radosław Group of the Home Army Roundabout, which, until 2001, was known as Babka Roundabout (Polish: Rondo Babka). The Polish word babka translates to "sandcastle", and the name from a large pile of sand which was stored in the place of the current roundabout in the 1950s.

== History ==
Babka Tower was designed by the architecture firm of JEMS Architekci, and financed by the company Echo Investment. It was constructed between 1998 and 2001, and upon its completion, with its total architectural height being 105 m (344 ft), it became the tallest residential building in Poland, and the first residential and third overall skyscraper in Poland to surpass 100 m (330 ft), though it height to the roof only measures 96 m (315 ft). It retained the titled of the tallest residential building until 2004, when Łucka City in Warsaw was constructed.

== Design and characteristics ==
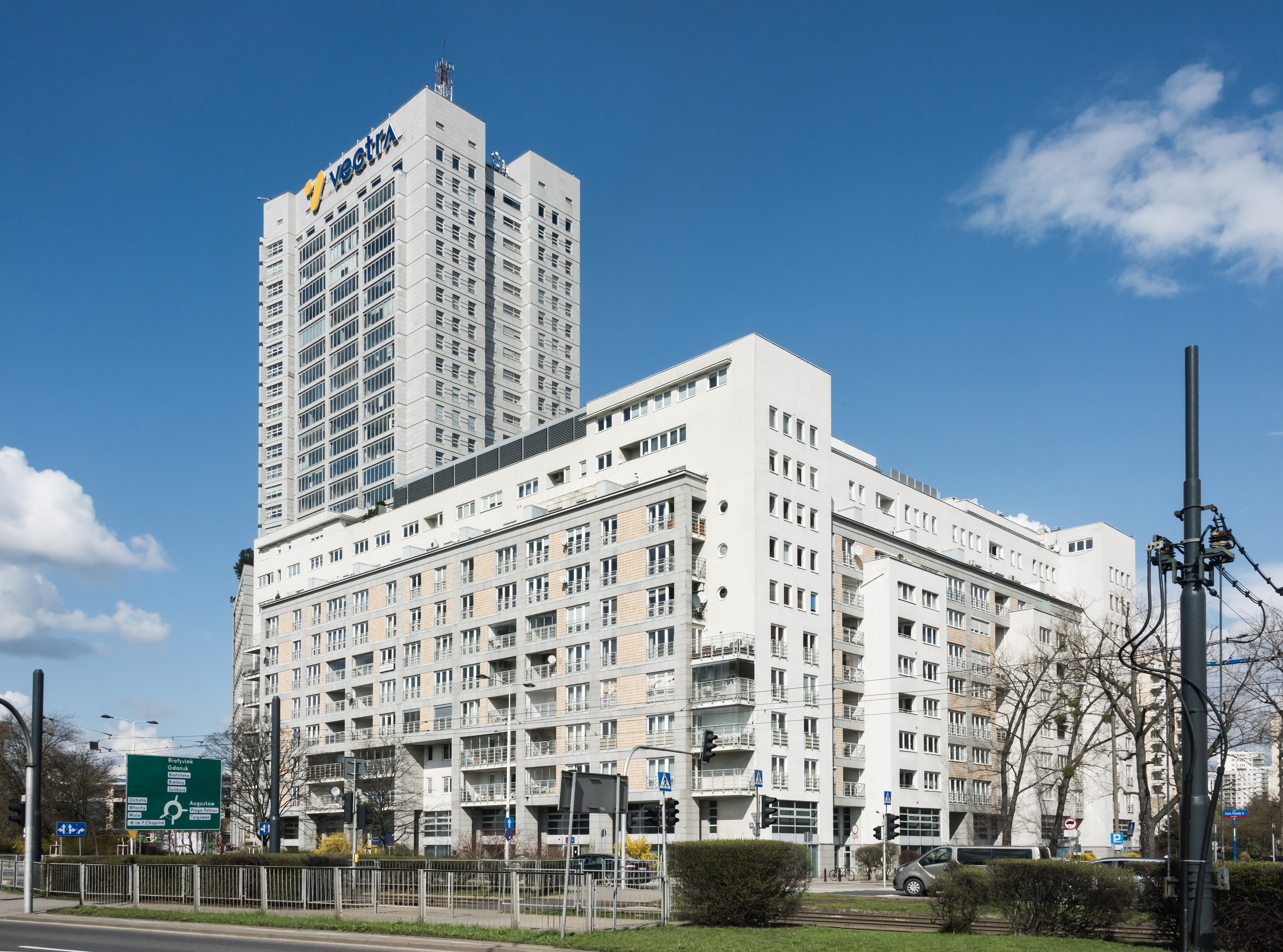
Babka Tower as seen from the intersection of John Paul II Avenue and Dzika Street.

Babka Tower is located at 80 John Paul II Avenue. The building is divided into two parts, the lower and wider segment with 12 storyes, and a tower with 28 storyes. It has a total height of 105 m (344 ft), and its height to the roof measures 96 m (315 ft), featuring a courtyard in the middle. Additionally, it has four underground storyes, which feature a car park with 675 parking spaces. The building has a total floor area of 84,850 m^{2} (913,300 sq ft). It predominantly consists of consists of luxurious residential apartments, with 185 in the core and 114 in the tower. Its lower segments are include office and service spaces. The building also include an indoor swimming pool accessible for the inhabitants.

The Babka Tower houses some of the facilities of the VIZJA University, as well as the monastery of the Dominican Sisters of the Immaculate Conception.
