= Kossowski =

Kossowski, feminine: Kossowska is a Polish surname. Notable people with the surname include:

- Adam Kossowski
- Jacques Kossowski
- Jan Kossowski
- Stefania Kossowska

== See also ==
- Kosewski
- Kosowski
- Kossewska
