= UEHS =

UEHS may refer to:

- University of Economics and Human Sciences in Warsaw, now VIZJA University, a private university based in Warsaw, Poland
- Union-Endicott High School, a public high school located in Endicott, New York
