= Kosowski =

Kosowski, feminine: Kosowska is a Polish surname. Notable people with the surname include:

- Kamil Kosowski (born 1977), Polish footballer
- Robert Kosowski (born 1964), American politician

== See also ==
- Kosewski
- Kossowski
