= Mariusz Kałużny =

Polish politician (born 1986)

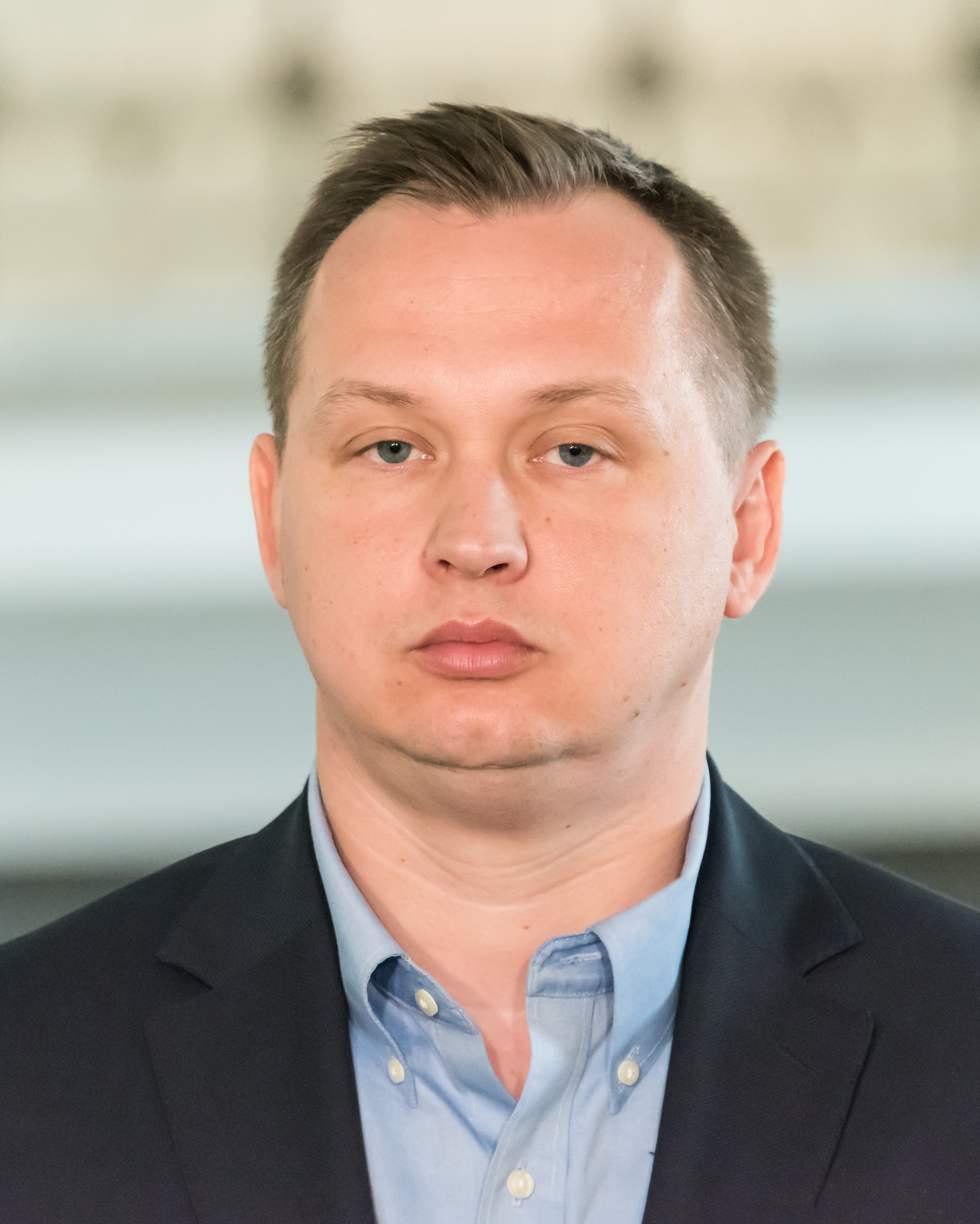
- Kałużny in 2023

Member of the Sejm
- Incumbent
- Assumed office 12 November 2019
- Constituency: Toruń

Personal details
- Born: 10 August 1986 (age 40)
- Party: Law and Justice (since 2024)
- Other political affiliations: Sovereign Poland (2012–2024)
- Spouse: Anna Kałużny
- Children: 3
- Education: VIZJA University

Mariusz Kałużny (born 10 August 1986) is a Polish politician serving as a member of the Sejm since 2019. He has served as leader of Law and Justice in Toruń since 2024. He graduated in 2018 from the University of Economics and Human Sciences in Warsaw (now VIZJA University).
