= Kowale, Gdańsk County =

Kowale
- Village
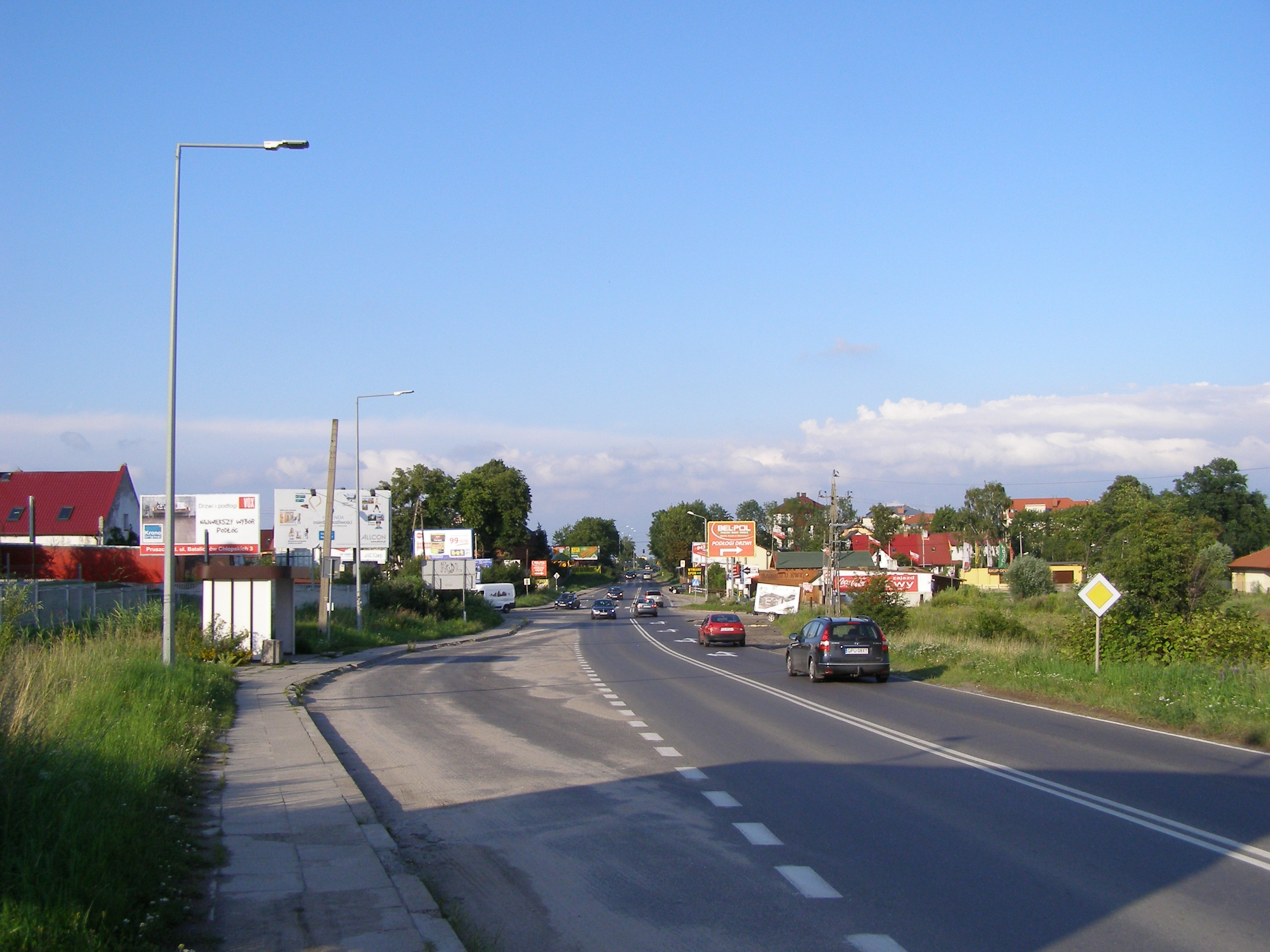
- DW221 highway in Kowale

- Location within Poland
- Coordinates: 54°18′34″N 18°33′42″E
- Country: Poland
- Voivodeship: Pomeranian
- County: Gdańsk
- Gmina: Kolbudy
- Website: http://www.kowale.pl/

Kowale [kɔˈvalɛ] is a village in the administrative district of Gmina Kolbudy, within Gdańsk County, Pomeranian Voivodeship, in northern Poland. The village has a population of 4,489.

For details of the history of the region, see History of Pomerania.

== Notable residents ==
- Johannes Baasch (1905–1944), German military officer

== Gallery ==
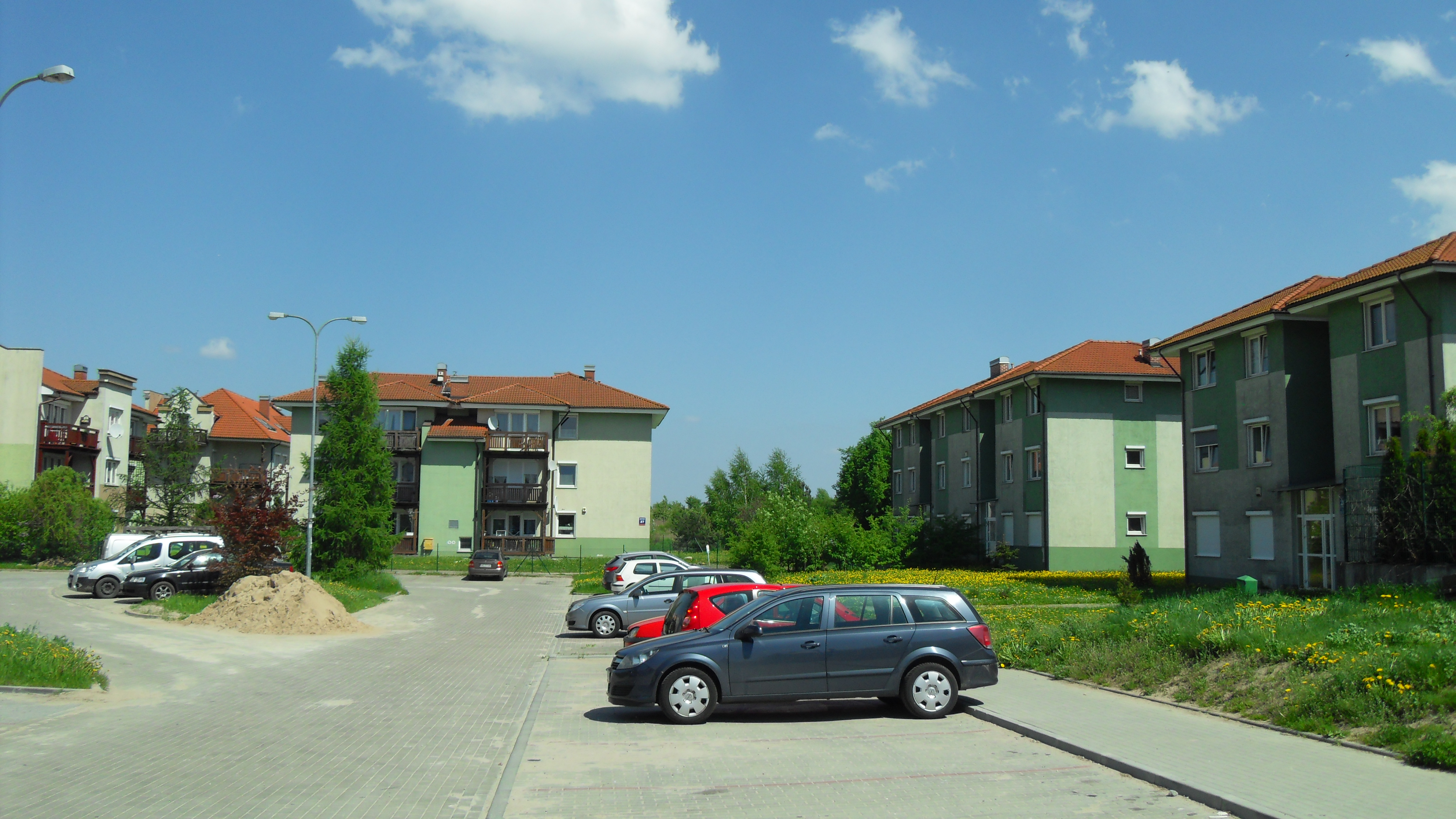
Apartment housing in the village

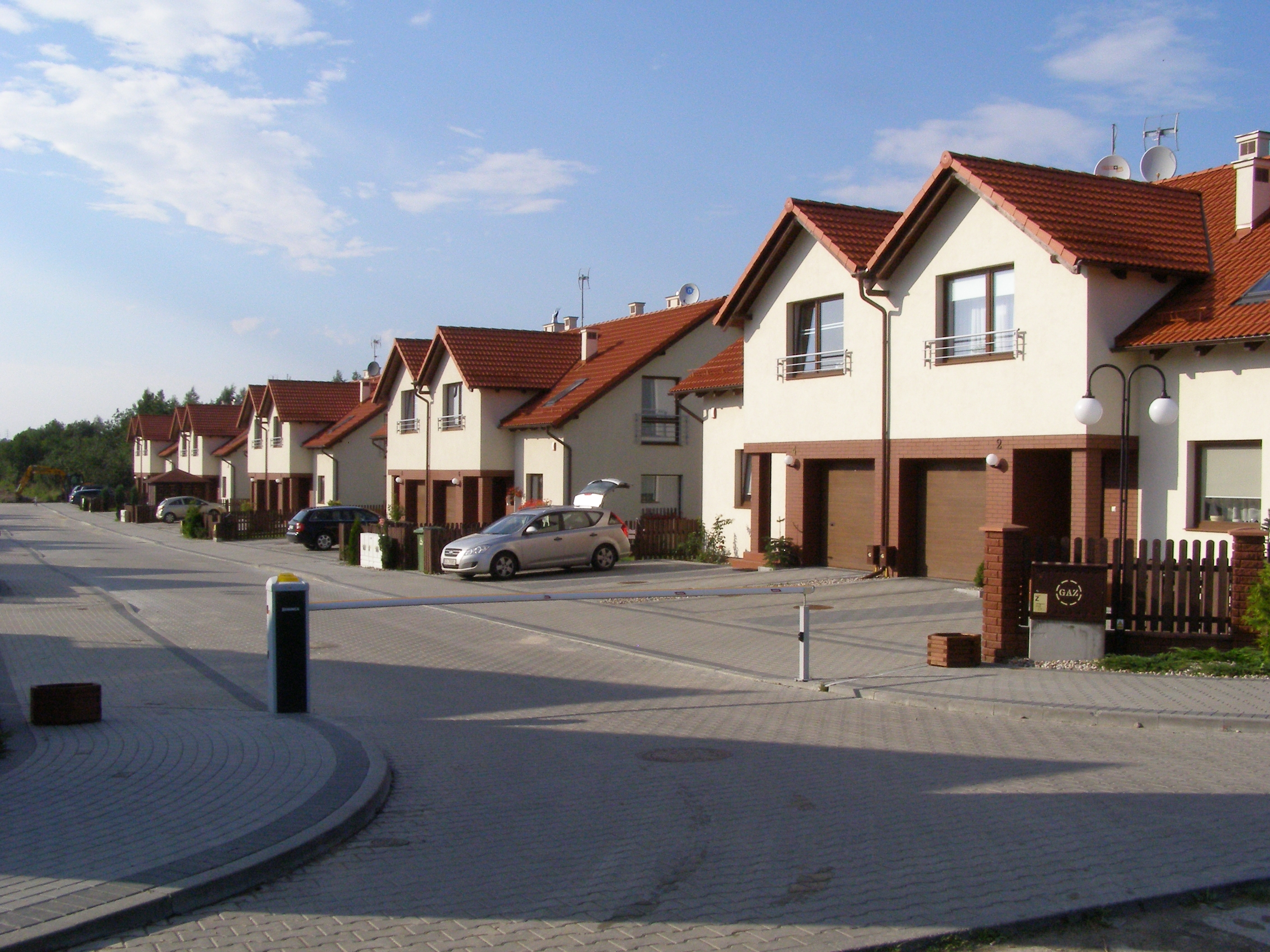
Single-family homes

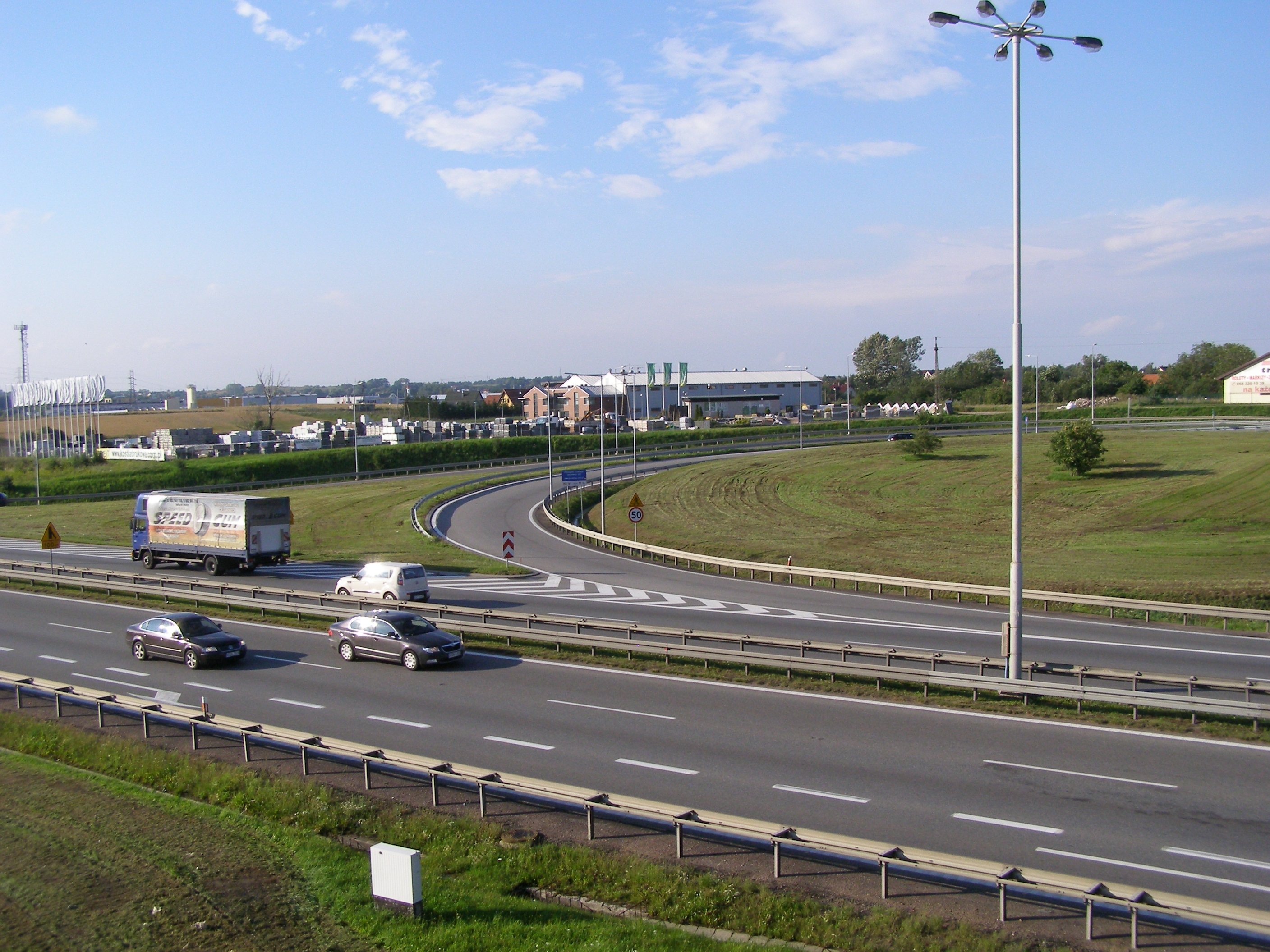
Interchange of the S6 expressway in Kowale

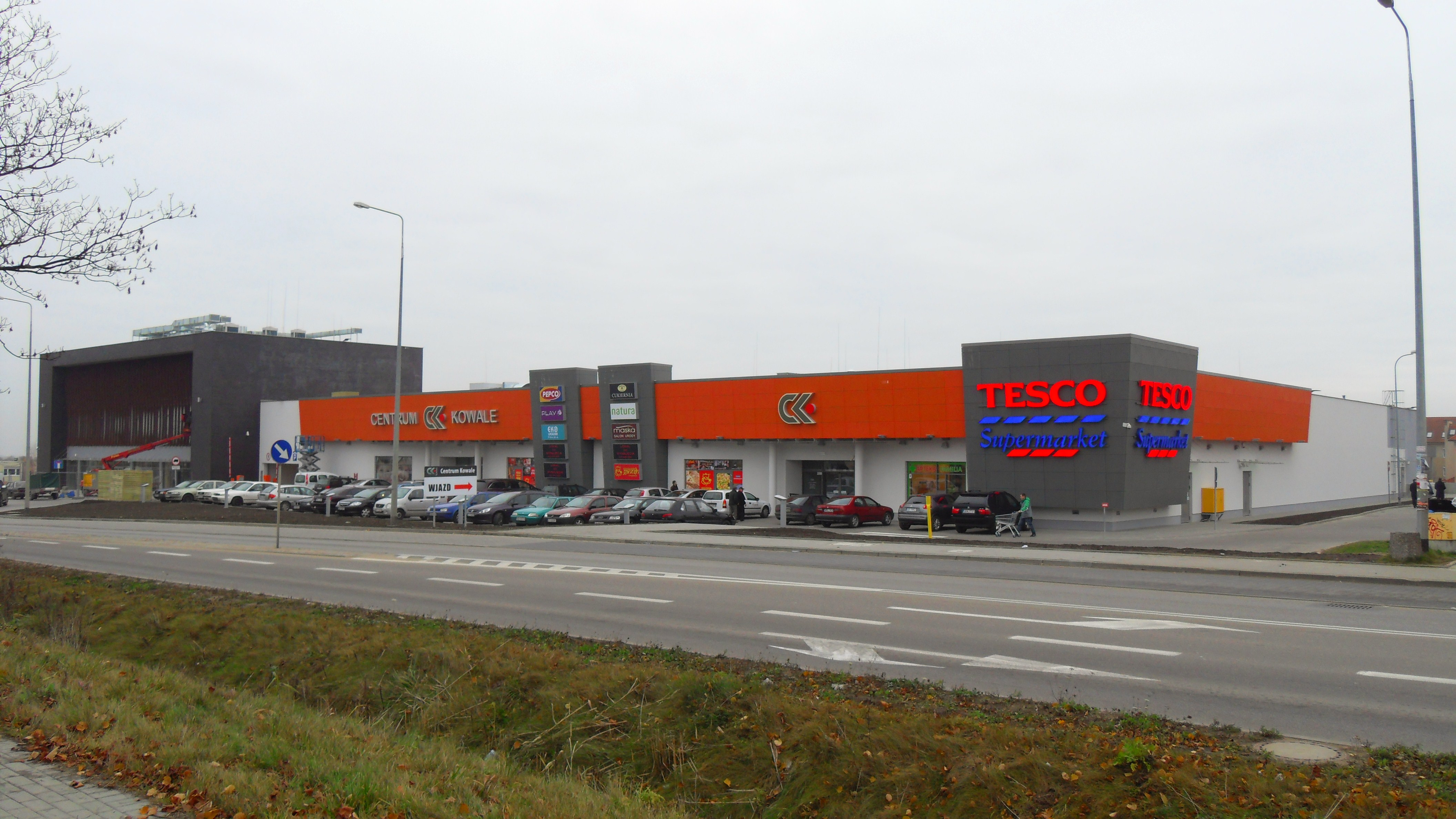
A large shopping mall
