= Marek Niechciał =

Polish economist, historian (born 1969)

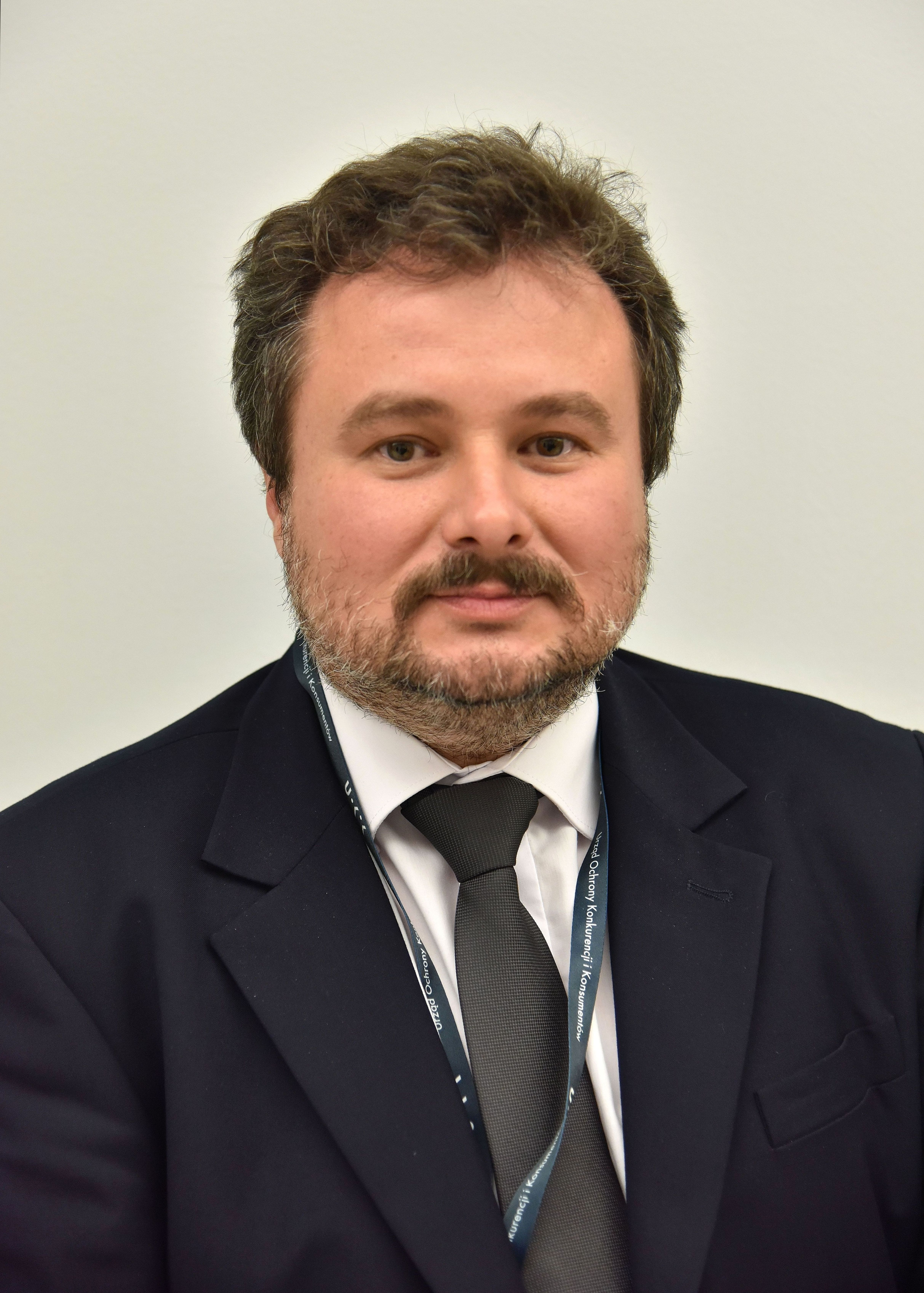

Marek Niechciał (born March 13, 1969) is a Polish economist and civil servant. His positions included head of the antitrust authority, Office of Competition and Consumer Protection. He lectured at VIZJA University.
