= Zbigniew Lew-Starowicz =

Polish psychiatrist and psychotherapist (1943–2024)

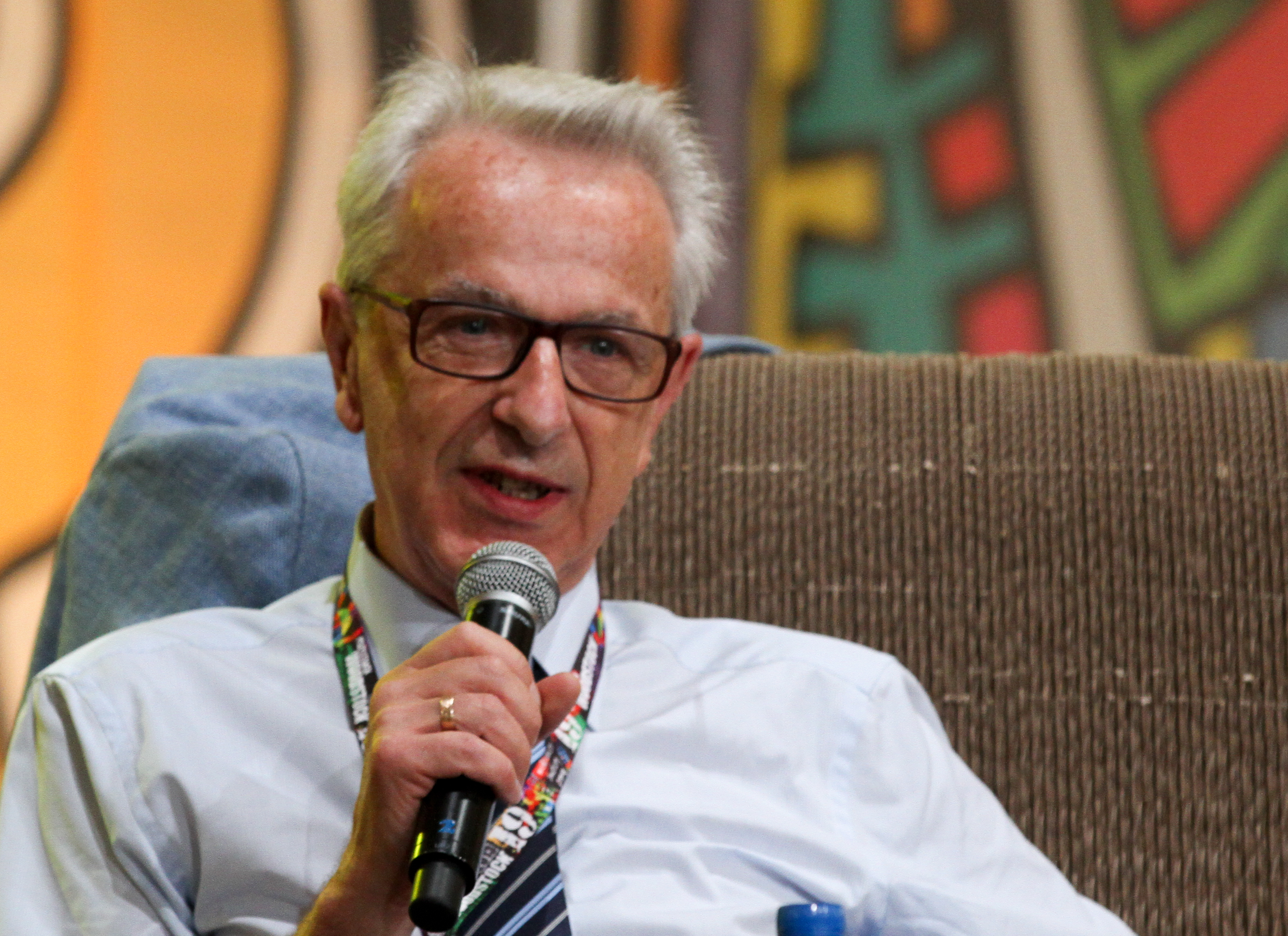
Lew-Starowicz in 2013

Zbigniew Kazimierz Lew-Starowicz (25 October 1943 – 13 September 2024) was a Polish psychiatrist and psychotherapist, expert in sexology and national consultant in this field, and professor of medical science. He worked at VIZJA University (then the University of Finance and Management in Warsaw). He was awarded the Knight's Cross (1997) and the Officer's Cross (2012) of the Order of Polonia Restituta. Lew-Starowicz died on 13 September 2024, aged 80.

== Controversies ==
In 1982, Lew-Starowicz claimed that he was convinced that around 30% of rapes are provoked. In 1992, he posited that"Research reveals that many women behave recklessly, I would say stupidly, others flirt and provoke erotically without the motivation to initiate sexual contact, and still others provoke men to aggressive behaviour by playing on their male ambition, etc.", and was quoted as saying that among the victims of rape were "accidental women (and here the defensive attitude revealed towards the aggressors is important), a group unconsciously provoking (easy establishing of acquaintances, showing off alleged sexual experience, and later surprise at the development of the situation), a group of consciously provoking women, who most often provoke and then try to withdraw at the last moment, which can be ineffective". This claim and similar claims blaming women for being raped were later widely criticised.

Lew-Starowicz practiced conversion therapy. In 2015, he apologized to the gay community for his involvement in administering electroshock therapy as a method of "curing" homosexuality. He was also criticised for his views on transgender issues.

In 2009, Lew-Starowicz defended film director Roman Polański, arguing that he was not a pedophile, and claimed that the victim's mother was involved in the crime. This was in reference to the 1977 case where Polański pleaded guilty to unlawful sexual intercourse with a minor. Polański had drugged and raped a 13-year-old girl. During the proceedings, Polański's lawyer also attempted to shift blame onto the victim's mother.
