= Żmijewo, Pomeranian Voivodeship =

Żmijewo
- Village
- Location within Poland
- Coordinates: 54°14′57″N 18°30′57″E
- Country: Poland
- Voivodeship: Pomeranian
- County: Gdańsk
- Gmina: Kolbudy

Żmijewo [ʐmiˈjɛvɔ] is a village in the administrative district of Gmina Kolbudy, within Gdańsk County, Pomeranian Voivodeship, in northern Poland.

For details of the history of the region, see History of Pomerania.
