= Babidół =

- Village
- Location within Poland
- Coordinates: 54°15′46″N 18°26′24″E
- Country: Poland
- Voivodeship: Pomeranian
- County: Gdańsk
- Gmina: Kolbudy
- Population: 115

Babidół [baˈbiduu̯] is a village in the administrative district of Gmina Kolbudy, within Gdańsk County, Pomeranian Voivodeship, in northern Poland.

For details of the history of the region, see History of Pomerania.

== History ==
Since 1466, when the rebels of the Prussian Confederation, partially successful in overthrowing the governing Teutonic Order, could only partition the western parts (Culmland, Pomerelia and Warmia) of Order Prussia, Babidół formed part of the Pomeranian Voivodeship in Polish-allied Royal Prussia.

In 1772, in the course of the First Partition of Poland Babidół became part of the Kingdom of Prussia. Babidół (Babenthal) then formed a manorial ward in the newly founded District of Dirschau. With partitioning Dirschau District in smaller districts in 1818, Babenthal formed part of the new Karthaus District in the Danzig Region within West Prussia. In 1871 Babenthal, with all of Prussia, became part of Germany. In 1910 Babenthal counted 133 inhabitants.

Following the provisions of the Treaty of Versailles, the Babenthal manorial ward was ceded to the Danzig Heights District, which became part of the Free City of Danzig, a League of Nations mandate, in January 1920, more than a year after World War I. In 1929, when the Senate of Danzig dissolved all manorial wards, assigning them to one or more adjacent municipalities or transforming them into municipalities of their own, Babenthal was upgraded to municipality. Babenthal then counted 278 inhabitants.

After the German and Soviet Invasion of Poland, in 1939 Nazi Germany annexed the mandated Danzig territory in a unilaterally act, not recognised under international law, and merged Babenthal in the new Danzig-West Prussia, an occupational authority not recognised under international law. Babenthal became part of the Rural district of Danzig for the period until the end of World War II.

By the end of the war, in early 1945, the Red Army conquered and occupied the area. In summer 1945, following the provisions of the Potsdam Agreement, the Soviet occupation forces handed over Babenthal, like all of the mandated Danzig territory, to Polish forces. The Polish administration renamed Babenthal as Babidół. As far as mandate Danzig nationals of German ethnicity had not fled the Soviet invasion, most of them were expelled in the following years.
