= Beata Rutkiewicz =

Polish politician (born 1997)

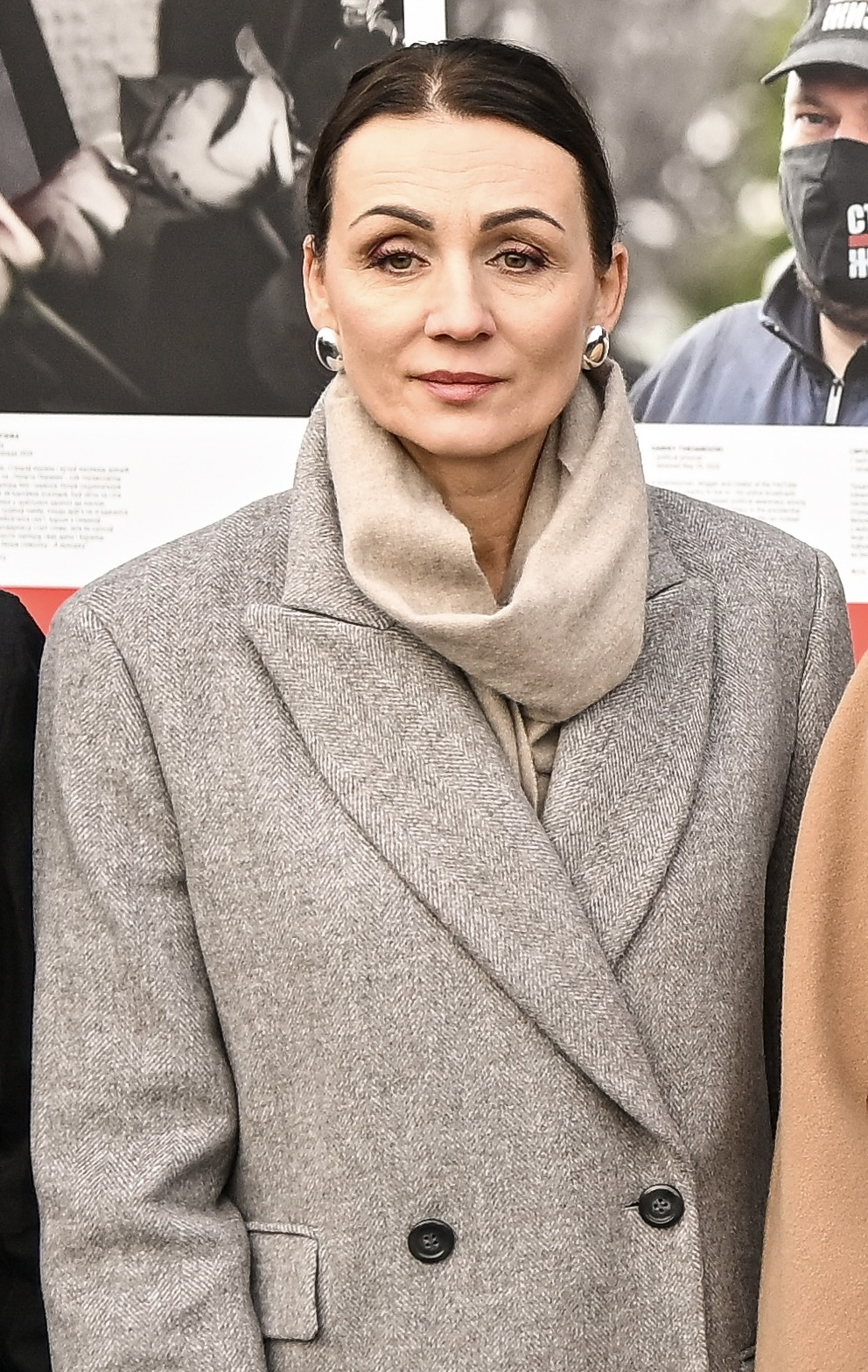
- Rutkiewicz in 2025.

Voivode of the Pomeranian Voivodeship
- Incumbent
- Assumed office 20 December 2023
- Preceded by: Dariusz Drelich

Deputy mayor of Wejherowo
- In office 23 March 2015 – 19 December 2023

Personal details
- Born: 9 February 1977 (age 49) Sierakowice, Poland
- Party: Independent
- Education: Gdańsk University of Technology; University of Gdańsk; VIZJA University; Collegium Humanum
- Occupation: Politician; Civil servant

Beata Katarzyna Rutkiewicz (Polish: [bɛˈa.ta ka.taˈʐɘ̟.na rutˈkjɛ.vit͡ʂ]; born 9 February 1977) is a Polish politician and civil servant. Since 2023, she has been the voivode of the Pomeranian Voivodeship in Poland. From 2015 to 2023, she was a deputy mayor of the town of Wejherowo in Pomeranian Voivodeship, Poland. She is an independent politician.

== Biography ==
Rutkiewicz was born on 9 February 1977 in the village of Sierakowice, then part of the Gdańsk Voivodeship in Poland, and now located in Kartuzy County within Pomeranian Voivodeship, Poland. She graduated from the Faculty of Ocean Engineering and Ship Technology of the Gdańsk University of Technology, and later received a postgraduate degree in government procurement from the University of Gdańsk. In 2022, Rutkiewicz graduated with a degree in human capital management and management psychology from VIZJA University (then the University of Economics and Human Sciences) in Warsaw. She also graduated from the Collegium Humanum in Warsaw with a Master of Business Administration.

Rutkiewicz worked as a specialist in government procurement in the Agricultural Property Agency in Gdańsk from 2003 to 2005, the town hall of Pruszcz Gdański from 2005 to 2011, and the civic centre of the municipality of Trąbki Wielkie from 2012 to 2015. In 2015, she became a deputy mayor of city development matters in Wejherowo. In the 2018 local elections, Rutkiewicz was elected to a seat in the Wejherowo City Council, as part of Krzysztof Hildebrandt's electoral committee. However she declined it, and remained in her previous office. On 20 December 2023, Rudkiewicz was appointed as the voivode of the Pomeranian Voivodeship, as an independent politician.

In 2024, Rutkiewicz appointed Radosław Król, the voivode of the Warmian–Masurian Voivodeship, to the board of directors of the Olsztyn Voivodeship Fund for Environmental Protection and Water Management in Pomeranian Voivodeship. In turn, he appointed her to its equivalent in the Warmian–Masurian Voivodeship. After the matter was publicised by the news media, both resigned from those functions.

== Personal life ==
She has a husband and two children.

== Electoral results ==
| Year | Office | Party | Constituency | Votes | | | Result | Ref. |
| Year | Office | Party | Constituency | Total | % | P. | Result | Ref. |
|---|---|---|---|---|---|---|---|---|
| 2018 | Wejherowo City Council | Local Government Electoral Committee; I Prefer Krzysztof Hildebrandt's Wejherowo | No. 2 | 492 | 8.12 | 3rd | Won (Note: Rutkiewicz did not assume the office.) | |
