= Karl-Heinz Bartsch =

German politician (1923–2003)

Chairman of the Agricultural Council
- In office 7 February 1963 – 9 February 1963
- Chairman of the Council of Ministers: Otto Grotewohl
- Preceded by: Hans Reichelt (as Minister for Agriculture and Forestry)
- Succeeded by: Georg Ewald

Personal details
- Born: Karl-Heinz Bartsch; 25 November 1923 Löblau, Free City of Danzig (now Lublewo Gdańskie, Poland)
- Died: 19 July 2003 (aged 79) Halle (Saale), Saxony-Anhalt, Germany
- Party: Socialist Unity Party (1949–1963)
- Education: Martin Luther University Halle-Wittenberg; University of Rostock (Dr. agr.)
- Occupation: Politician; Party Functionary; Academic
- Awards: Iron Cross, 2nd class; Patriotic Order of Merit, 2nd class
- Central institution membership: 1963: Candidate member, Politburo of the Central Committee; 1963: Full member, Central Committee; Other offices held: 1962–1963: Deputy Minister, Ministry for Agriculture and Forestry; 1960–1962: Deputy Head, Central Committee Agriculture Department

Karl-Heinz Bartsch (25 November 1923 – 19 July 2003) was a German agronomist and university teacher who became an East German politician (SED). He rose through the ranks, becoming a Deputy Minister for Agriculture and, more briefly, a member of the powerful ruling party Central Committee. He was even listed as a candidate for politburo membership. In 1963 he was stripped of his functions and his party membership was withdrawn after it was determined that he had been lying about his membership of the Waffen-SS during the Nazi period.

== Life ==
Karl-Heinz Bartsch was born in Löblau (Lublewo), a suburb in the Danziger Höhe region, near the German northern coast. His father was a farm-estate manager. Karl-Heinz attended school in Danzig, successfully completing his school career in 1940/41 at the city's "Horst-Wessel-Gymnasium" (secondary school). He was a Hitler Youth member. On leaving school he enrolled in a land management traineeship on the Schwikow estate, while also working as a farm labourer. The country had by this time been at war for a year and a half, and in April 1941 he volunteered to join the Waffen-SS. He was accepted and sent for a five-month training with the so-called "Death-head" 3rd SS Tank Division. He later joined the "Götz von Berlichingen" SS Division. In Autumn/Fall 1942 he was posted to France. In June 1943 he was sent to the Russian front where he took part in and survived the Battle of Kursk. He was nevertheless wounded in August 1943 and was awarded the Iron Cross 2nd Class. Between August 1943 and January 1944 he was recuperating in a military hospital at Weiden in der Oberpfalz. He then rejoined the "Götz von Berlichingen" division, now promoted to the rank of Unterscharführer (loosely "junior squadron leader"), and was sent back to France. War ended in May 1945, and that same month Bartsch was captured and held as a Prisoner of war by the Americans. During May/June 1945 he was held in a large "Displaced persons' camp" at Saalfelden (near Salzburg) in Austria.

1944 and 1945 saw industrial-scale ethnic cleansing in the eastern part of Germany. Following frontier changes mandated by the Soviet Union and her allies Poland had moved and Danzig had become Gdańsk, so that when Bartsch was released in June 1945 there could be no question of going home. Instead he made his way to Saxony-Anhalt in the central part of Germany which was now being administered as the Soviet occupation zone. The slaughter of war had left a desperate shortage of working age labour, and during 1945/46 Karl-Heinz Bartsch worked as a farm labourer on the Lutzfeld estate. Passing his Abitur back in 1940/41 would, under peacetime conditions, have opened the way to university-level education, and in 1946, with the war over, he enrolled at the Martin Luther University in Halle. He emerged in 1949 with a degree in agriculture.

By the time he graduated with his first degree Bartsch had already, in February 1949, joined the Socialist Unity Party ("Sozialistische Einheitspartei Deutschland" / SED). Formed less than three years earlier, the SED was by this time well on the way to becoming the ruling party in the territory that would be relaunched, in October 1949, as the Soviet sponsored German Democratic Republic (East Germany). Towards the end of 1949 he became an "Aspirantur" (post-graduate student) at the University of Rostock Institute for Animal Research, which he combined with work as a research assistant at the nearby Dummerstorf Research Establishment (renamed in 1952 as the "Institut für Tierzuchtforschung Dummerstorf"). He received his doctorate in agriculture in 1951 in return for a comparative study (published in book form few years later) of four different dairy cattle breeds in North-west Europe.

In 1952 Bartsch was appointed to take charge (as "business leader" / "Betriebsleiter") of VEG Clausberg, till recently a large landed estate and now, following the land reforms of the late 1940s, a large agricultural co-operative in the countryside to the west of Erfurt, in the south of the country. Under the highly centralised Leninist constitutional system being rolled out across East Germany, structural links between industry – including farming – and the ruling party were very close: between 1954 and 1960 Bartsch was a member of the party's district leadership team ("Bezirksleitung") for the Erfurt region. Between 1958 and 1960 he was also a department head and chairman of the faculty council at the National Academy of Agricultural Sciences. During this time he undertook research and published a record of his investigations and findings on "cross-breeding and performance testing of native Thuringian "Frankenrind" cattle" ("Umzüchtung und Leistungsprüfung des bodenständigen thüringischen Frankenrinds"). It was during this period, in 1959, that he was a recipient of the Patriotic Order of Merit in silver.

Between 1960 and 1962 Bartsch served as deputy chief of the Agriculture department of the party Central Committee. In 1961 he received his habilitation (higher academic degree) from the University of Rostock, a qualification which would have opened the way to a full-time university career, though in his case his academic work continued to run in parallel with his political responsibilities. Between 1961 and the start of 1963 he served as Director of the Institute for Animal Research and Domestic Animal Genetics at the Agriculture Faculty at Berlin University ("Humboldt-Universität zu Berlin") where at the start of 1963 he was also appointed to a professorship. Between 1962 and the start of 1963 he also served as East Germany's Deputy Minister for Agriculture, Farm records and Forestry.

At the sixth SED party congress, on 21 January 1963 Karl-Heinz Bartsch was himself (s)elected as a member of the party Central Committee. Central Committee membership had by now grown to 121. Nevertheless, the fact that Bartsch, still aged only 39, was at the same time elected as a candidate for membership of the Central Committee's inner caucus, the Politburo, indicates that within the nation's power structure his career trajectory was still strongly on the up. Indeed, on 21 January 1963 he took part in a closed meeting of the politburo. The next month, between 7 and 9 February 1963, he served as chairman of the newly created "Agriculture Council" of the Council of Ministers to which he had also now been appointed. The appointment led to him being described by one (unsympathetic western) commentator as the boss of East Germany's "newly founded Supreme Agricultural Authority" ("neugegründeten obersten Landwirtschaftsbehörde").

== Removal from power ==
At this point reports appeared in the Berliner Zeitung, a West Berlin daily newspaper, that in the 1940s Karl-Heinz Bartsch had spent four years as a member of the Waffen-SS. The Ministry for State Security regional administration in Neubrandenburg was able immediately to confirm details of his National Socialist past. His fall from political power was as sudden as his rise three weeks earlier. On or before 9 February 1963 his exclusion from the Central Committee and from the Politburo was confirmed to Politburo members. Reports appeared in western media at the same time that he had been excluded from the Central Committee of the SED and released from his position as a deputy minister "because he had concealed his membership of the Waffen-SS and thereby greatly damaged the party". (Note: "Genosse Karl-Heinz Bartsch wurde aus dem Zentralkomitee (der SED) ausgeschlossen, weil er seine Zugehörigkeit zur Waffen-SS verschwiegen hat und dadurch der Partei großen Schaden zufügte.") East German politicians and media frequently berated the West German political establishment for alleged insufficient diligence applied to "denazification" in the later 1940s, and the case of Karl-Heinz Bartsch provided a welcome opportunity for western media to return one more time to the counter-attack, with (at least) one commentator reporting that eighteen years after the National Socialist régime had been destroyed, 51 of the 400 members of the East German parliament ("Volkstag") were still former Nazi Party members. The article referred to here concluded with the reassuring thought that under these circumstances there was no reason for Comrade Bartsch to give up all hope that he might one day be "rehabilitated".

There was a well worn path to be followed for East German politicians who found themselves suddenly disgraced and excluded from office: Karl-Heinz Barstch played his part, with a carefully drafted statement of remorse: "Unfortunately I did not have he courage, when I joined the Socialist Unity Party of Germany (1949), nor subsequently, to come clean about my membership of the Waffen-SS". (Note: "Leider hatte ich nicht den Mut, bei meinem Eintritt in die Sozialistische Einheitspartei Deutschlands (1949) und bei späteren Anlässen offen meine Zugehörigkeit zur Waffen-SS zuzugeben.") He also took the opportunity to refute reports that he had been a " Waffen-SS veteran" ("Alter Kämpfer"), pointing out that when he had volunteered to join the organisation he had been aged just 18. Nevertheless, by a resolution of the Central Party Control Commission dated 28 March 1963 his party membership was revoked because he had "concealed his membership of the Waffen-SS and given a false presentation of the facts about his past. (Note: Verschweigen seiner Zugehörigkeit zur Waffen-SS u. falscher Darstellung von Fakten aus seiner Vergangenheit)

Between April 1963 and February 1965 Bartsch worked as head of animal breeding at VEG Groß Vielen (Waren), another agricultural co-operative that had originated as a large private estate. He then moved to Woldegk where between 1965 and 1981 he was director for animal husbandry at the agriculture co-operative. He was also in charge of the research centre for animal production there. On 3 December 1972 Karl-Heinz Bartsch applied to be readmitted to the party, but on 2 March 1973 word came through that his application had been rejected by Central Party Control Commission, apparently at the insistence of the chairman, Erich Mückenberger.

According to one normally reliable source, between 1967 and 1989 Karl-Heinz Bartsch was registered with the Ministry for State Security as an informant ("Inoffizieller Mitarbeiter" / IM). He was identified in the Stasi files by the cover-name "Eckart", and was of particular interest to the authorities because he provided "material" about Western European scientists and academics.

Between 1981 and his retirement in 1988 Bartsch served as Agricultural Production Cooperative Chairman at a Cattle Research Establishment. After his retirement from that post he continued to teach at the Agricultural Engineering College in Neubrandenburg.
