= Małgorzata Bartyzel =

Polish politician (1955–2016)

Deputy of the V Sejm
- In office 2005 – 2007
- Constituency: 9 Łódź

Personal details
- Born: Małgorzata Maria Bartyzel; 12 November 1955 Łódź, Polish People's Republic
- Died: 23 July 2016 (aged 60) Łódź, Poland
- Party: Prawica Rzeczypospolitej
- Education: University of Łódź

Małgorzata Maria Bartyzel (12 November 1955 – 23 July 2016) was a Polish politician. She was elected to Sejm on 25 September 2005, getting 8,333 votes in 9 Łódź district as a candidate from the Law and Justice list. She worked at VIZJA University (then the University of Economics and Human Sciences in Warsaw).

== See also ==
- Members of Polish Sejm 2005-2007
