= Miechucińskie Chrósty (Gdańsk county) =

- Settlement
- Location within Poland
- Coordinates: 54°15′15″N 18°29′46″E
- Country: Poland
- Voivodeship: Pomeranian
- County: Gdańsk
- Gmina: Kolbudy

Miechucińskie Chrósty [mʲɛxuˈt͡ɕiɲskʲɛ ˈxrustɨ] was a settlement in the administrative district of Gmina Kolbudy, within Gdańsk County, Pomeranian Voivodeship, in northern Poland. The village was officially dissolved in 2015.

For details of the history of the region, see History of Pomerania.
