= Jankowo Gdańskie =

- Village
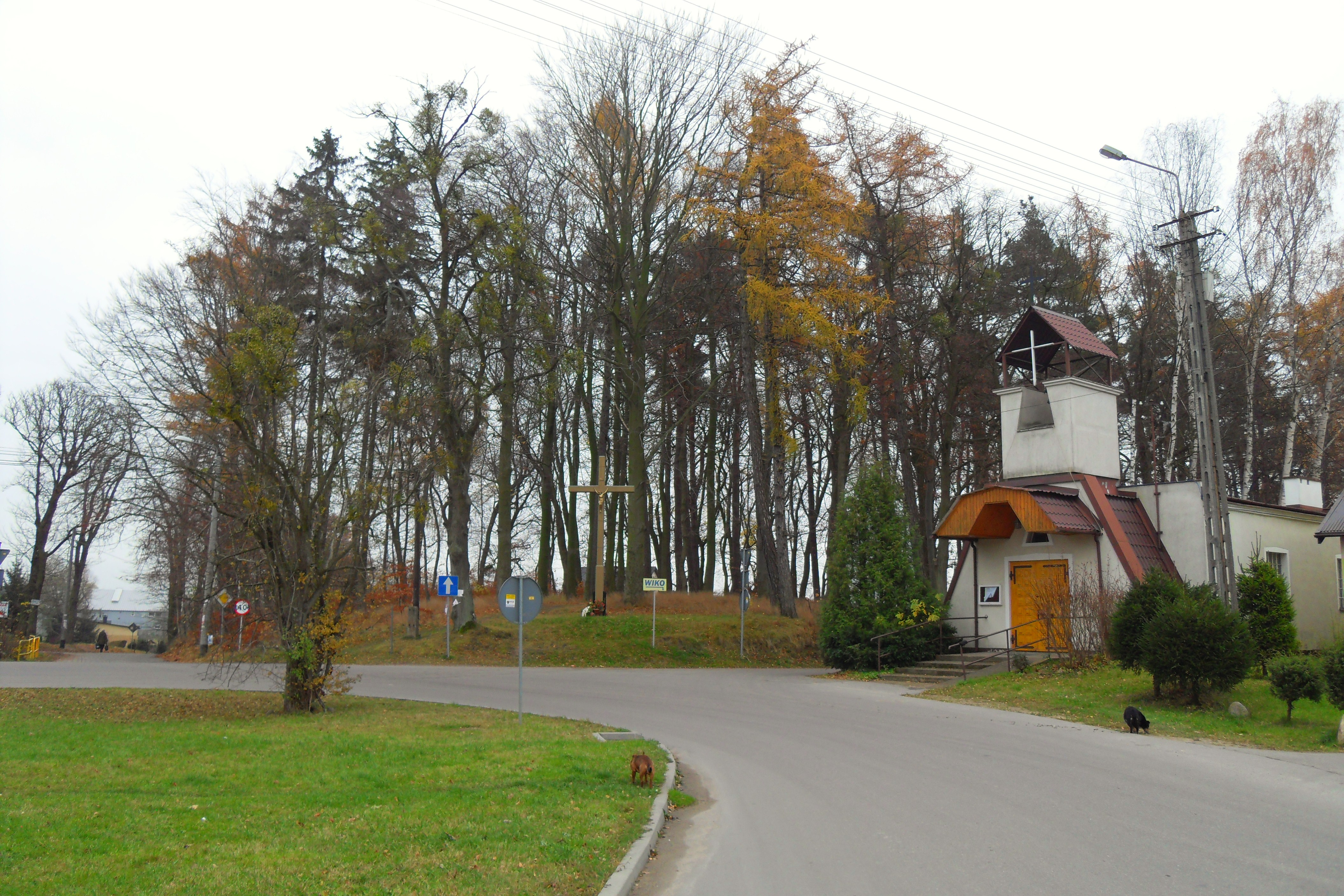
- View on the local chapel

- Location within Poland
- Coordinates: 54°17′44″N 18°33′9″E
- Country: Poland
- Voivodeship: Pomeranian
- County: Gdańsk
- Gmina: Kolbudy

Population
  - Total: 983
- Time zone: UTC+1 (CET)
  - Summer (DST): UTC+2 (CEST)
- Vehicle registration: GDA

Jankowo Gdańskie (Polish: [jaŋˈkɔvɔ ˈɡdaj̃skʲɛ]) is a village in Gmina Kolbudy, in Pomeranian Voivodeship, in northern Poland.

== History ==
The first record of the village existing is from 1315 when bishop Gerard travelled to the village and paid his tithes to the Benedictines from there, where it was documented. Next, it was mentioned in the 16th century, where Konstantyn Ferber inherited the land after his father. The village was historically known as Jankowo and Janichowo in Polish.

In the late 18th century Jankowo was owned by Carol Frederick von Conradi, which had no children, and in order to leave a sign of his ownership behind, he created a research institute — Conradinum. The school was transformed into an Adolf Hitler School during the German occupation in World War II.
