= Bielkowo railway station =

Railway station in Bielkówko, Poland

Coordinates: 54°15′52″N 18°30′12″E

Bielkowo
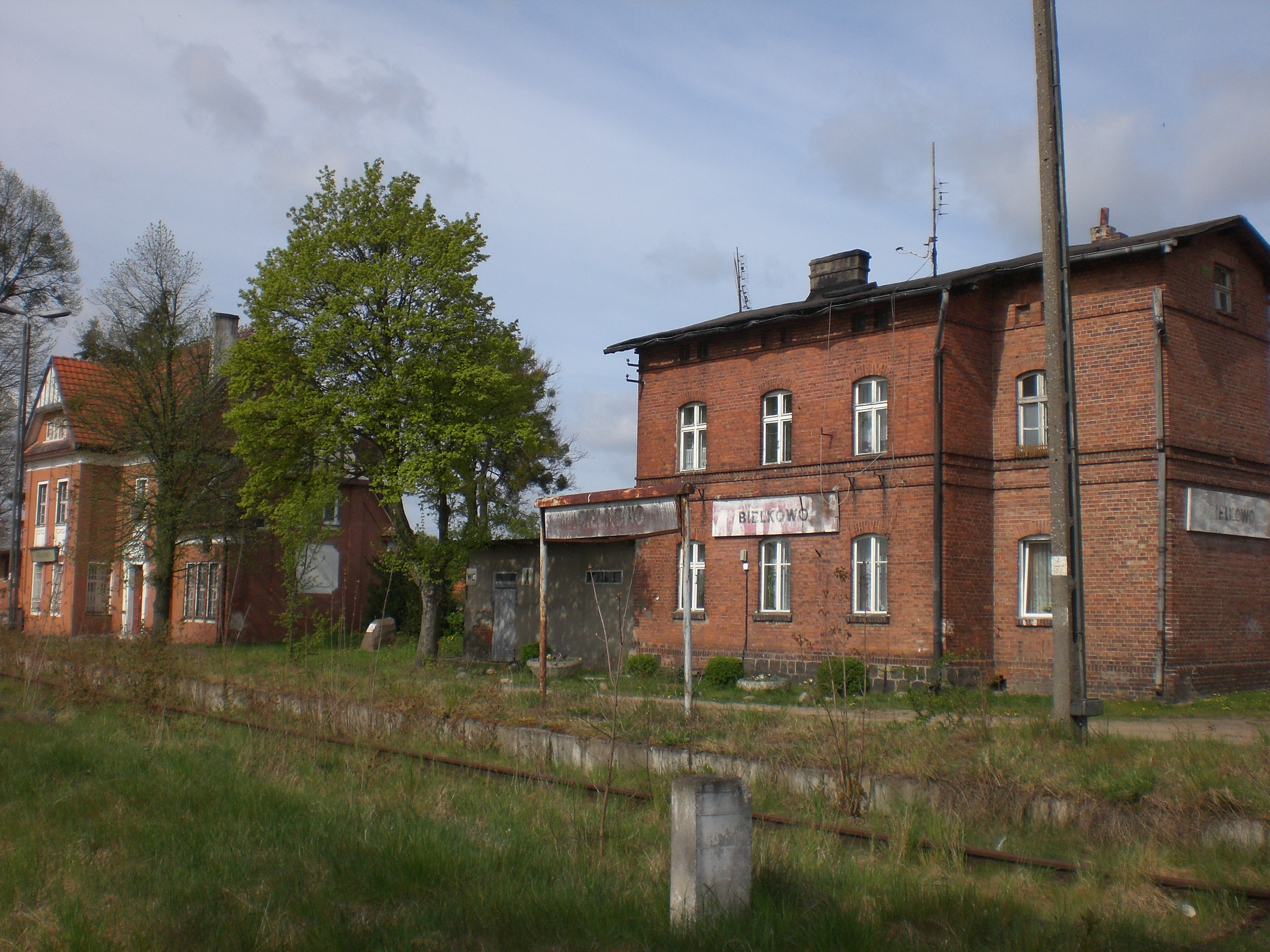

General information
- Location: Bielkowo; Poland
- Owner: Polskie Koleje Państwowe S.A.

Construction
- Structure type: Building: Yes (no longer used); Depot: Never existed Water tower: Never existed

History
- Former names: Bölkau until 1945
Location

Bielkowo is a non-operational PKP railway station in Bielkowo (Pomeranian Voivodeship), Poland.

== Lines crossing the station ==
| Start station | End station | Line type |
|---|---|---|
| Pruszcz Gdański | Łeba | Closed |
