= Bąkowo, Gdańsk County =

Bąkowo
- Village
- Location within Poland
- Coordinates: 54°17′34″N 18°31′48″E
- Country: Poland
- Voivodeship: Pomeranian
- County: Gdańsk
- Gmina: Kolbudy
- Population: 260

Bąkowo [bɔŋˈkɔvɔ] is a village in the administrative district of Gmina Kolbudy, within Gdańsk County, Pomeranian Voivodeship, in northern Poland.

For details of the history of the region, see History of Pomerania.
