= Gołąbkowo =

- Settlement
- Location within Poland
- Coordinates: 54°17′0″N 18°32′35″E
- Country: Poland
- Voivodeship: Pomeranian
- County: Gdańsk
- Gmina: Kolbudy
- Vehicle registration: GDA

Gołąbkowo [ɡɔwɔmpˈkɔvɔ] is a settlement in the administrative district of Gmina Kolbudy, within Gdańsk County, Pomeranian Voivodeship, in northern Poland.

== History ==
Gołąbkowo was a private village of Polish nobility, including the Straszyński family, administratively located in the Gdańsk County in the Pomeranian Voivodeship of the Kingdom of Poland.
