= Buszkowy Górne =

- Village
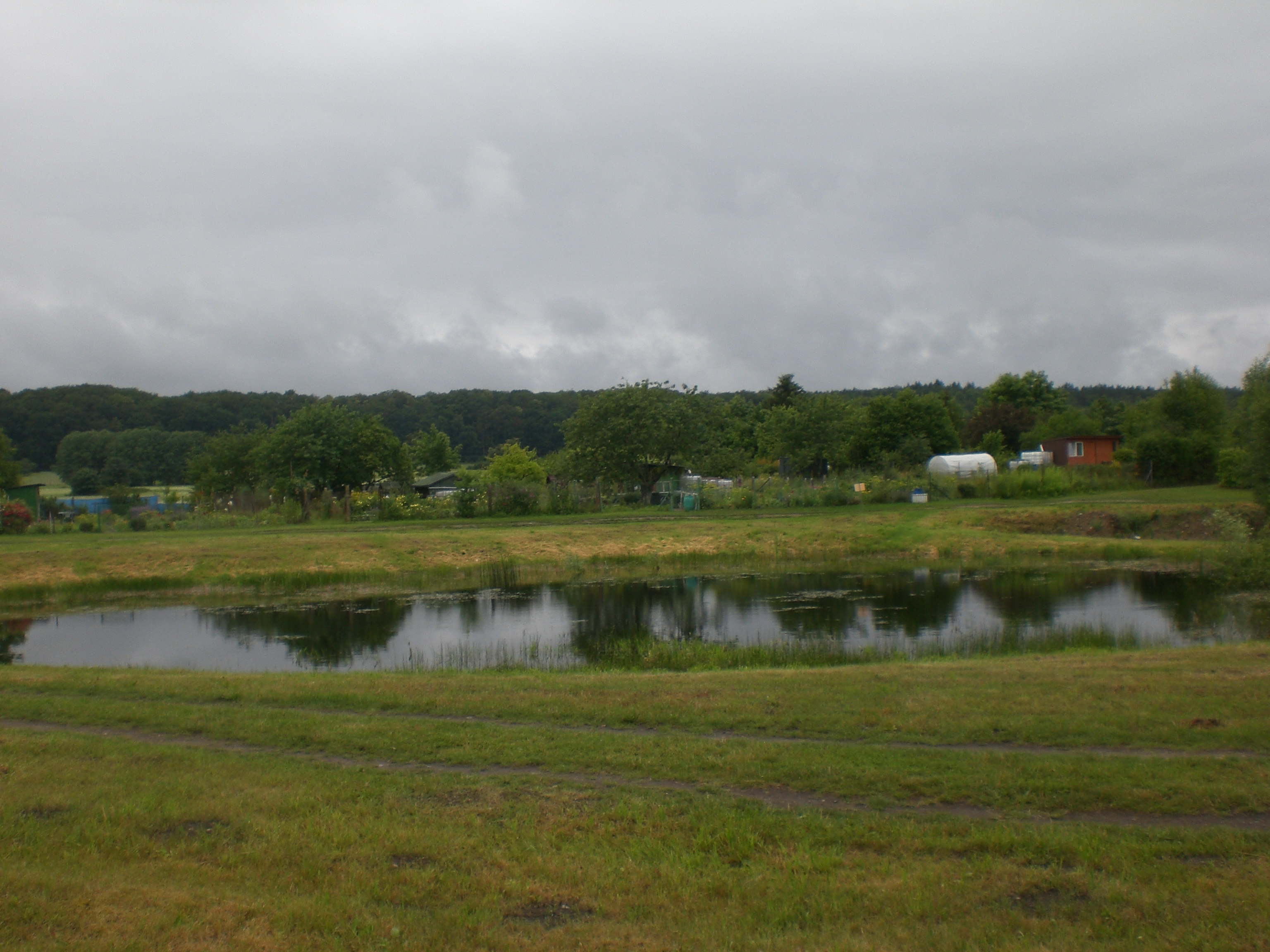

- Location within Poland
- Coordinates: 54°14′N 18°26′E
- Country: Poland
- Voivodeship: Pomeranian
- County: Gdańsk
- Gmina: Kolbudy

Population
  - Total: 620
- Vehicle registration: GDA

Buszkowy Górne [buʂˈkɔvɨ ˈɡurnɛ] is a village in the administrative district of Gmina Kolbudy, within Gdańsk County, Pomeranian Voivodeship, in northern Poland.

== History ==
Buszkowy was a private village of Polish nobility, administratively located in the Gdańsk County in the Pomeranian Voivodeship of the Kingdom of Poland.
