= Czapielsk =

- Village
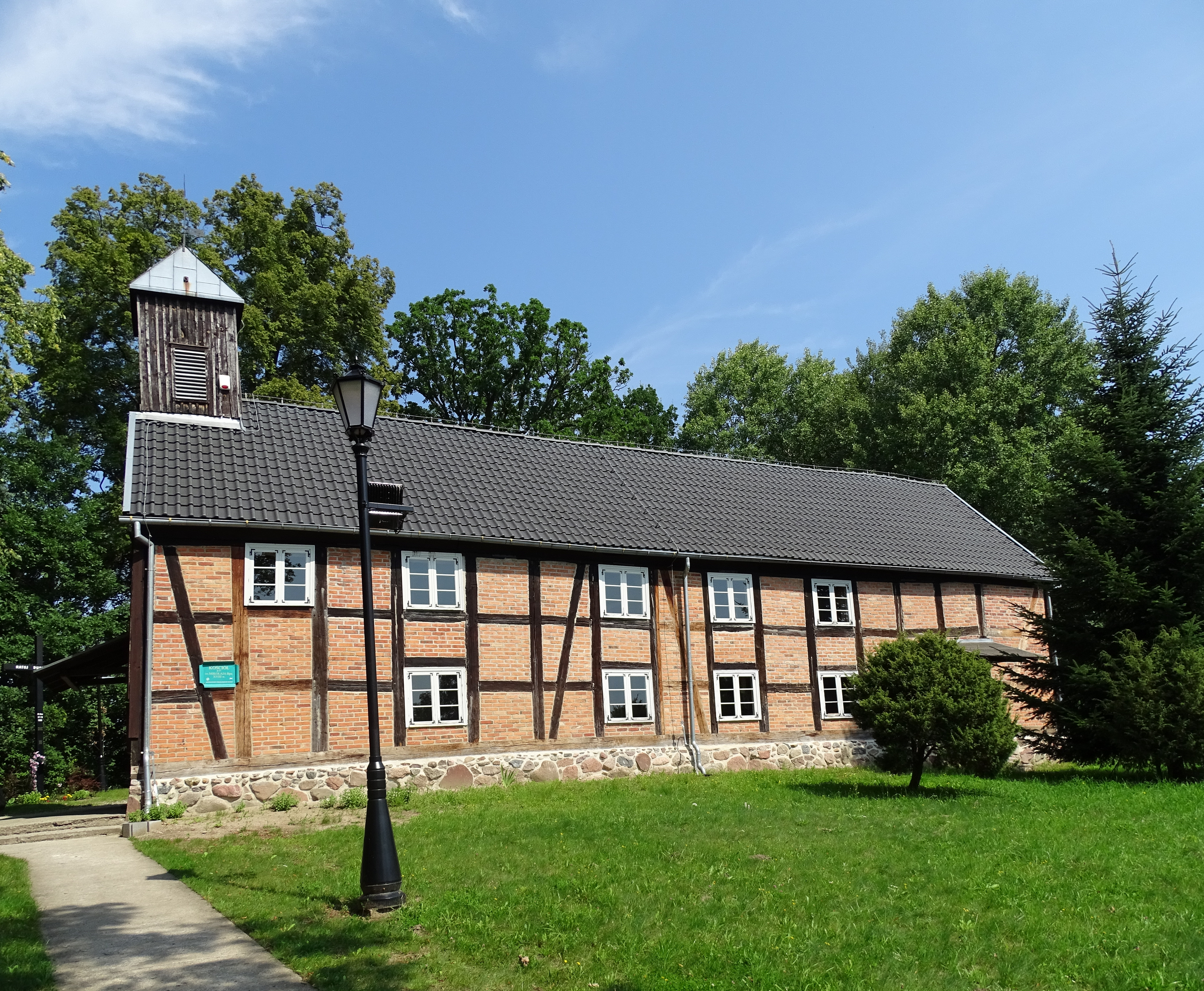
- Saint Nicholas church in Czapielsk

- Location within Poland
- Coordinates: 54°15′52″N 18°24′29″E
- Country: Poland
- Voivodeship: Pomeranian
- County: Gdańsk
- Gmina: Kolbudy

Population
  - Total: 217
- Vehicle registration: GDA

Czapielsk [ˈt͡ʂapjɛlsk] is a village in the administrative district of Gmina Kolbudy, within Gdańsk County, Pomeranian Voivodeship, in northern Poland. It is located in the ethnocultural region of Kashubia in the historical region of Pomerania.

== History ==
It was a private village of Polish nobility, including the Jackowski family, administratively located in the Gdańsk County in the Pomeranian Voivodeship of the Kingdom of Poland.
