= Gmina Kolbudy =

Gmina Kolbudy Kolbudy Commune
- Gmina
- Coat of arms

- Gmina Kolbudy (Poland)
- Coordinates (Kolbudy): 54°16′15″N 18°28′20″E
- Country: Poland
- Voivodeship: Pomeranian
- County: Gdańsk
- Seat: Kolbudy

Area
  - Total: 82.8 km^{2} (32.0 sq mi)

Population (2021)
  - Total: 17,256
  - Density: 208/km^{2} (540/sq mi)
- Website: http://www.kolbudy.pl

Gmina Kolbudy is a rural gmina (administrative district) in Gdańsk County, Pomeranian Voivodeship, in northern Poland. Its seat is the village of Kolbudy, which lies approximately 11 kilometres (7 mi) west of Pruszcz Gdański and 15 km (9 mi) south-west of the regional capital Gdańsk.

The gmina covers an area of 82.8 square kilometres (32.0 sq mi), and as of 2006 its total population was 12,042. It is divided into 20 sołectwos. Its largest village is Kowale.

== Villages ==
List of villages
Village	Population
Babidół	128
Bąkowo	905
Bielkówko	1127
Bielkowo	317
Buszkowy Górne	567
Czapielsk	462
Gołąbkowo	No data
Jankowo Gdańskie	954
Kolbudy	3635
Kowale	4536
Krymki	No data
Łapino	625
Lisewiec	331
Lublewo Gdańskie	1559
Miechucińskie Chrósty	No data
Nowiny	101
Ostróżki	168
Otomin	983
Pręgowo	949
Żmijewo	No data

== History ==
To 1920, the terrain was divided between the counties of Kartuzy and Gdańsk. Similar to the gmina, Kolbudy was also divided into two — The west was called Higher Kolbudy and was owned by Kartuzy while the east was called Lower Kolbudy and was owned by Gdańsk. The river Radunia marked the border.

After the Free City of Danzig became independent, the area was incorporated into it due to a German majority as part of Danziger Höhe. After Germany attacked Poland and annexed the free city, it became part of Nazi Germany until the Soviets liberated it in the East Pomeranian offensive.

On 30 March 1945 the Gdańsk Voivodeship was created and the gmina was incorporated into it. 20 December 1998 Higher and Upper Kolbudy were merged. In 1999 Gmina Kolbudy became part of the newly created Pomeranian Voivodeship, which it is part of to this day.

== Neighbouring gminas ==
Gmina Kolbudy is bordered by the city of Gdańsk and by the gminas of Pruszcz Gdański, Przywidz, Trąbki Wielkie and Żukowo.
