= Lublewo Gdańskie =

- Village
- Location within Poland
- Coordinates: 54°17′N 18°30′E
- Country: Poland
- Voivodeship: Pomeranian
- County: Gdańsk
- Gmina: Kolbudy
- Population: 1,512

Lublewo Gdańskie (Polish: [luˈblɛvɔ ˈɡdaj̃skʲɛ]) is a village in the administrative district of Gmina Kolbudy, within Gdańsk County, Pomeranian Voivodeship, in northern Poland.

For details of the history of the region, see History of Pomerania.

== Notable residents ==
- Karl-Heinz Bartsch (1923-2003), German politician
