= Dominican Sisters of the Immaculate Conception =

Religious community, founded 1861 in Poland

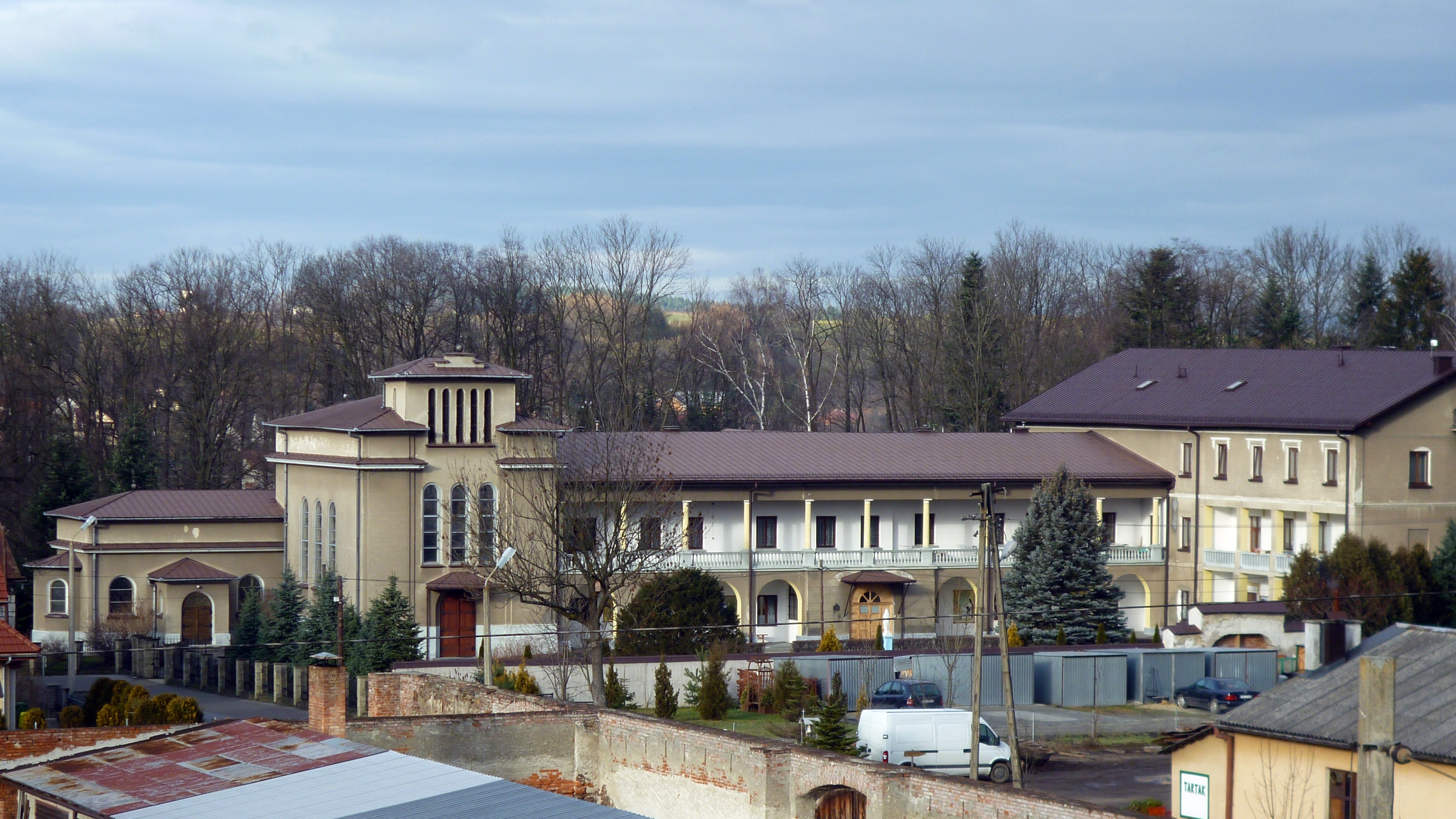
Convent of the Congregation of the Sisters of St. Dominic, founded in 1895

The Dominican Sisters of the Immaculate Conception Province are a religious community of women consecrated to Christ in the Dominican charism with the mission of preaching the Gospel especially to those in most need (Constitutions no.4). The Congregation lives out this preaching through education, evangelization, and by aiding the sick and suffering. The community was founded in 1861 by Maria Rose Kolumba Białecka (1838–1887) in Poland.

== Identity & Mission ==
The ministry of the Dominican Sisters of the Immaculate Conception Province focuses on Christian education, evangelization, care of the sick and suffering. A typical daily routine for the sisters includes Divine Office, meditation, Holy Sacrifice of the Mass, Holy Hour of Eucharistic Adoration, Rosary, spiritual reading, recreation, and apostolic work. The apostolic work ranges in nature from teaching, facilitating retreats, caring of the sick and elderly, to preparation for the Sacred Liturgy (see Mass), etc.

The Dominicansa, also known as “Order of Preachers”, – adhere to the motto of “contemplare et contemplata aliis tradere", which translates from Latin as “to contemplate and to pass on the fruits of contemplation". They were founded by St. Dominic in the 13th century. He was motivated by the society's need for Truth, and strove to confront heresy through preaching and prayer.

All religious institutes share certain practices in common, such as community prayer (primarily the Divine Office), community meals, work, private prayer, meditation, study, and, finally, religious vows (typically, the vows of evangelical counsels; poverty, chastity, and obedience). Often, the formation process is divided into five “stages” of discernment: observant/aspirant, postulant, novice, simply professed and solemnly professed (or perpetual vows). Until solemn profession of vows, the discernment process typically continues for about 5–8 years and the novice can leave at any time during this period.

A typical schedule for a religious community might look like the following: 5:00 AM, Rise 5:30 AM, Office of Readings (Matins)/ Morning Prayer (Lauds), Meditation 6:30 AM, Holy Mass 7:45 AM, Breakfast 9:30 AM, Morning Chores/ Classes 11:30 PM, Midday Prayer (Terce/None) 12:30 PM, Lunch (with spiritual readings) 2:00 PM, Apostolate 5:00 PM, Supper 6:00 PM, Eucharistic Adoration 7:00 PM, Night Prayer (Compline) 10:00 PM, Lights out

Institutes that are more “contemplative” (e.g. Benedictines) tend to allot more time to community prayer and have a more fixed schedule as listed above. On the other hand, the Dominicans, who are more “active", allot more time to an apostolate (serving the community in some capacity). Regardless of being contemplative or active, or both, every religious community shares in common both the heart of life is prayer and dedication to a life of self-conversion and renunciation for the sanctification of the Church. Across all religious communities is a shared breath of prayer, because they all recite the same Divine Office every day across the world.

Active institutes are perhaps better labeled “active-contemplative.” They are those, such as the Franciscans, Dominicans, Missionaries of Charity, etc., who tend to have more worldly interaction compared with contemplative orders. Saint Thomas Aquinas suggested that these active-contemplative orders are the most perfect form of religious life. However, in the words of Saint Francis of Assisi, one cannot be in the world without amounting “a little dust on his shoulders" and these orders must be the most vigilant. The closer one draws to the world, the more at risk he is of being sucked into it and conforming to the flesh instead of the spirit. Dominicans draw inspiration from St. Paul, who reminded the faithful: “Pray at all times in the Spirit, with all prayer and supplication. To that end keep alert with all perseverance, making supplication for all the saints, and also for me in opening my mouth boldly to proclaim the mystery of the gospel, for which I am an ambassador in chains; that I may declare it boldly, as I ought to speak.” Thus, the more active a religious, the more prayerful he must be also. The power of conversion relies entirely on one's recourse to prayer.

== History ==
The Dominican Sisters of the Immaculate Conception Province were founded by Mother Maria Rose Kolumba Białecka in 1861. She was born on August 23, 1838, in eastern Poland. Utilizing her many natural and supernatural gifts, Mother Białecka, at the age of 19, followed the dictates of her heart and entered the novitiate of the Dominican Sisters in Nancy, France to receive her religious formation. Not long after making her first religious vows, she returned to Poland to lay the foundations for the Congregation of the Dominican Sisters in Poland.

Her mission of charity began by organizing a network of parochial schools where children and adults could learn to read, write, and better understand the Catholic faith. With high poverty and illiteracy, she believed it was the responsibility of the Church to aid society's poorest, sick, and dying with material help and sacramental assistance.

Mother Białecka founded the very first Dominican Convent in Poland in 1861. Before her death in 1887, this congregation grew significantly and four other convents were also established.

== Membership ==
The requirements for entering the congregation are that the applicant must be 18–35 years of age, have a high school diploma, be in good physical, mental and emotional health, and have a pastor's or spiritual director's letter of recommendation. Both the community and the applicant engage in a period of discernment to determine if the lifestyle is a good fit for the applicant.

== Areas where the order can be found ==
The Dominican Sisters of the Immaculate Conception are present in 8 countries and on 4 continents and they have served the Church in North America for over 100 years. Other convents of Dominican Sisters of the Immaculate Conception in North America are found in Justice, Illinois (Provincial House); Milwaukee; Mountain Home, Arkansas; and Calgary, Alberta, Canada. They also have convents and mission houses in Poland, Italy, Cameroon, Russia, Ukraine, and Belarus.
