= VIZJA University =

Private university in Warsaw, Poland

Coordinates: 52°14′39″N 20°58′57″E

- Uniwersytet VIZJA
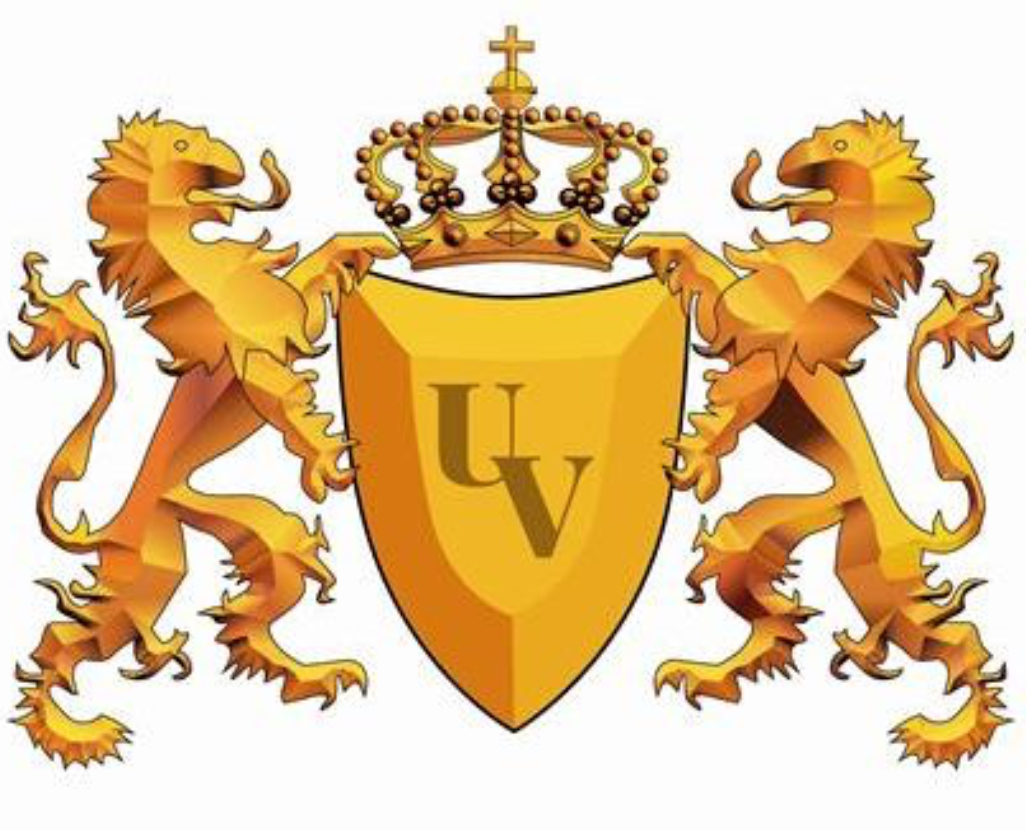
- Former names: University of Finance and Management in Warsaw (2001–2018); University of Economics and Human Sciences in Warsaw (2018–2025)
- Motto: Per scientiam ad sapientiam (translated: Through knowledge to wisdom)
- Type: Private
- Established: 8 May 2001 (25 years ago)
- Rector: prof. dr hab. Konrad Janowski
- Students: 16,297 (12.2023)
- Location: 01-043 Warsaw, Poland
- Campus: Urban
- Language: Polish, English
- Colors
- Website: www.vizja.pl
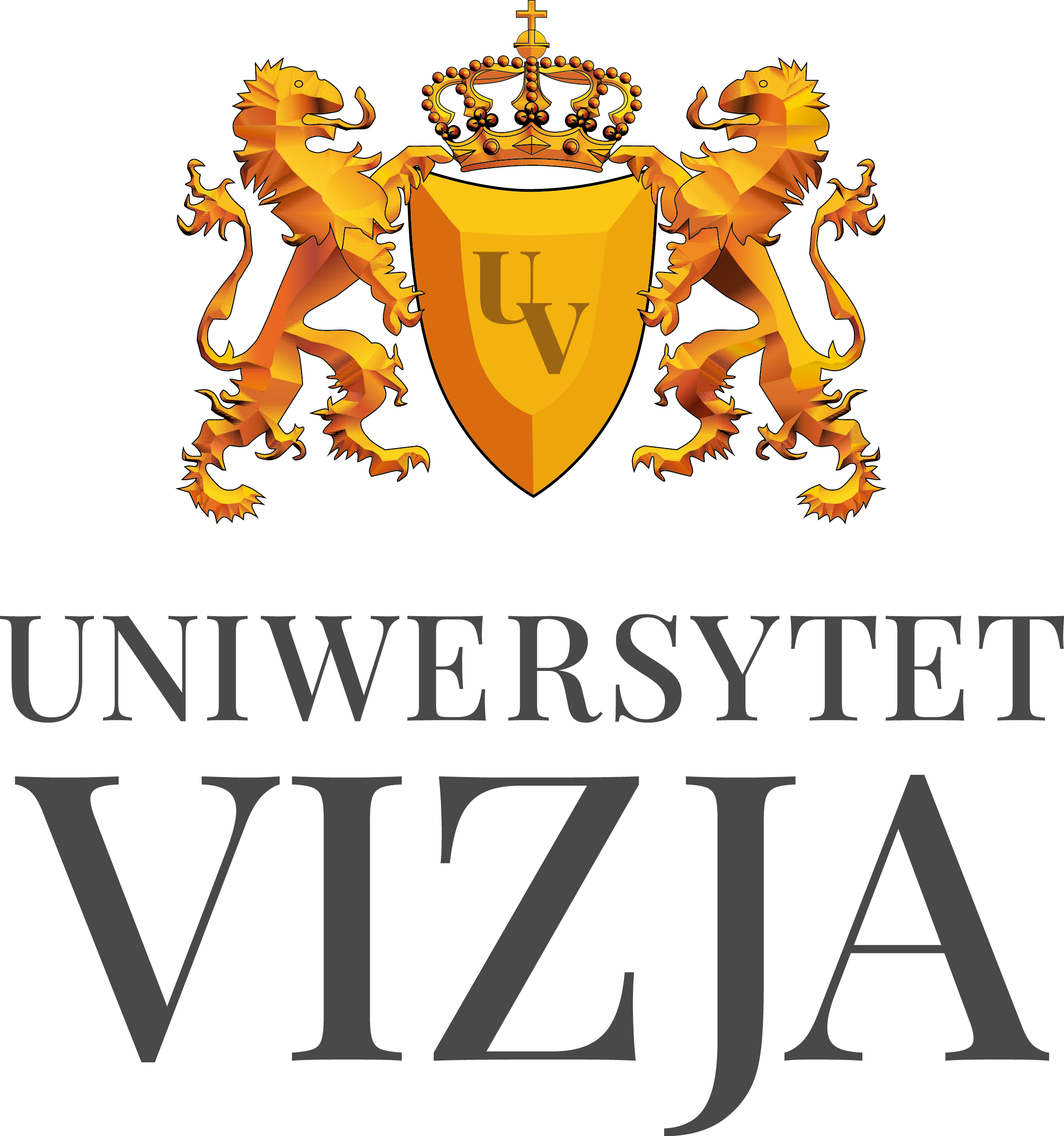

VIZJA University (Polish: Uniwersytet VIZJA, UV), until May 2025 the University of Economics and Human Sciences in Warsaw (UEHS; Polish: Akademia Ekonomiczno-Humanistyczna w Warszawie, AEH), is a private university based in Warsaw, Poland. VIZJA specializes in the fields of finance and management, social sciences, and human sciences, but also offers degrees in medical sciences and the arts. The university is renowned for its courses in Psychology, recommended by the Polish Academy of Sciences, and the university's School of Business has CEEMAN International Quality Accreditation.

VIZJA University was established in 2001 as the University of Finance and Management in Warsaw (UFM; Polish: Wyższa Szkoła Finansów i Zarządzania w Warszawie, WSFiZ). In September 2018, the Polish Accreditation Commission (Polska Komisja Akredytacyjna) granted VIZJA the status of “academy”, a university-type higher education institution. It incorporated the University of Information Technology in Warsaw (Wyższa Szkoła Technologii Informatycznych w Warszawie, WSTIW) in October 2019, which had existed since 2004 and had been issuing accredited university degrees since 2009. In May 2025, VIZJA received the status of "university", (Note: The term “university” is reserved for university-type higher education institutions which have the A+, A or B+ research rating in at least 6 disciplines included in at least 3 fields of science or art.) adopting its current name. By then, VIZJA had become the most popular non-public university in Poland, and ranked 1st for Best-Educated Academic Staff in the Perspektywy Ranking.

== Facilities ==
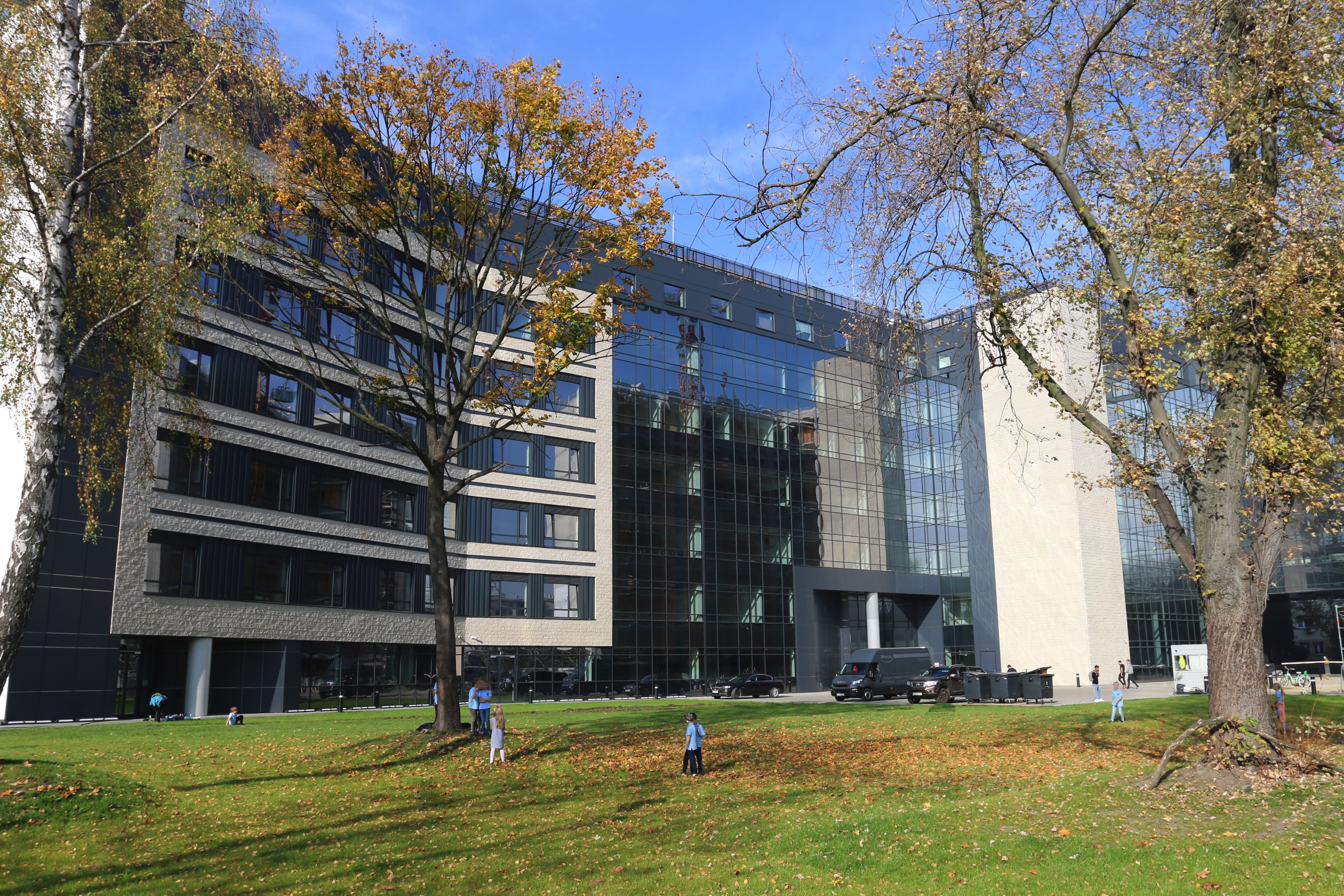
Main building (Vizja Park Campus)

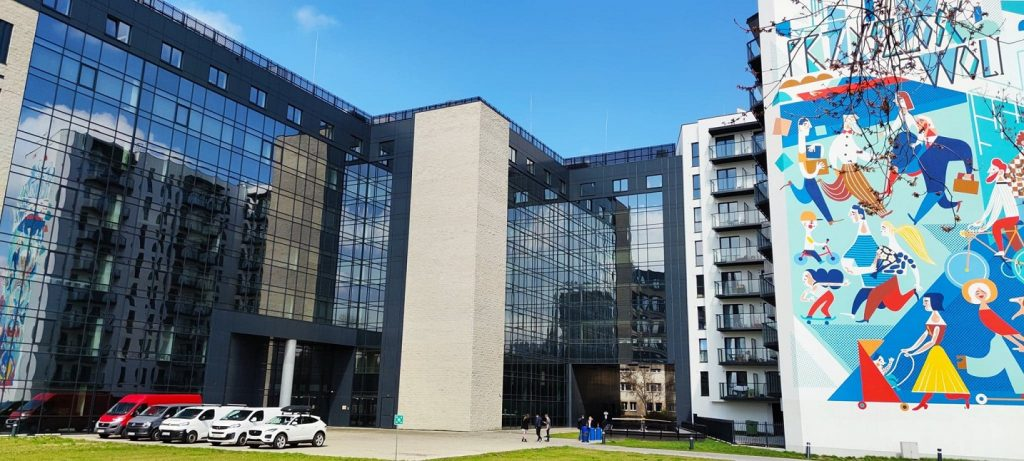
Entrance of the main building

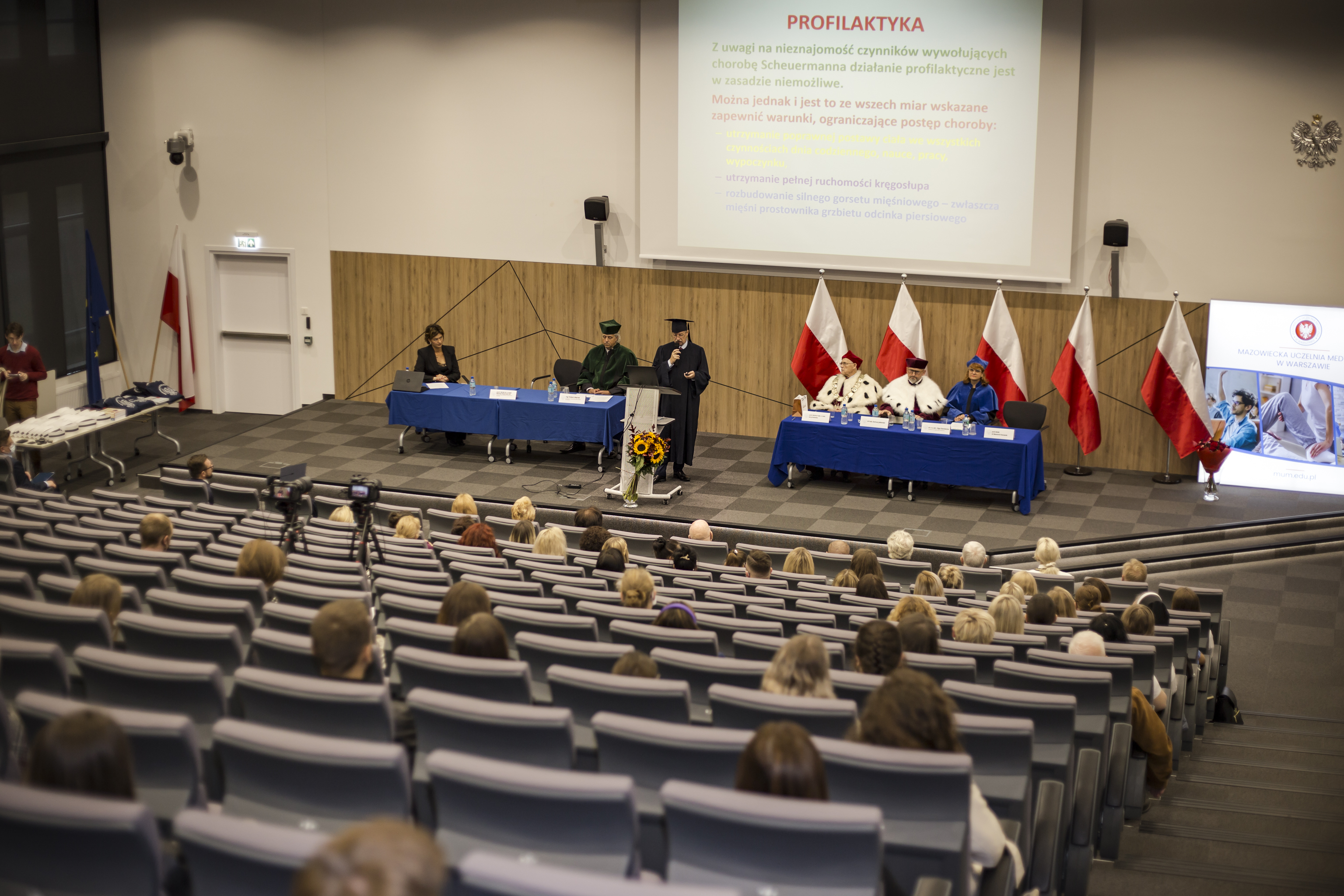
Main auditorium

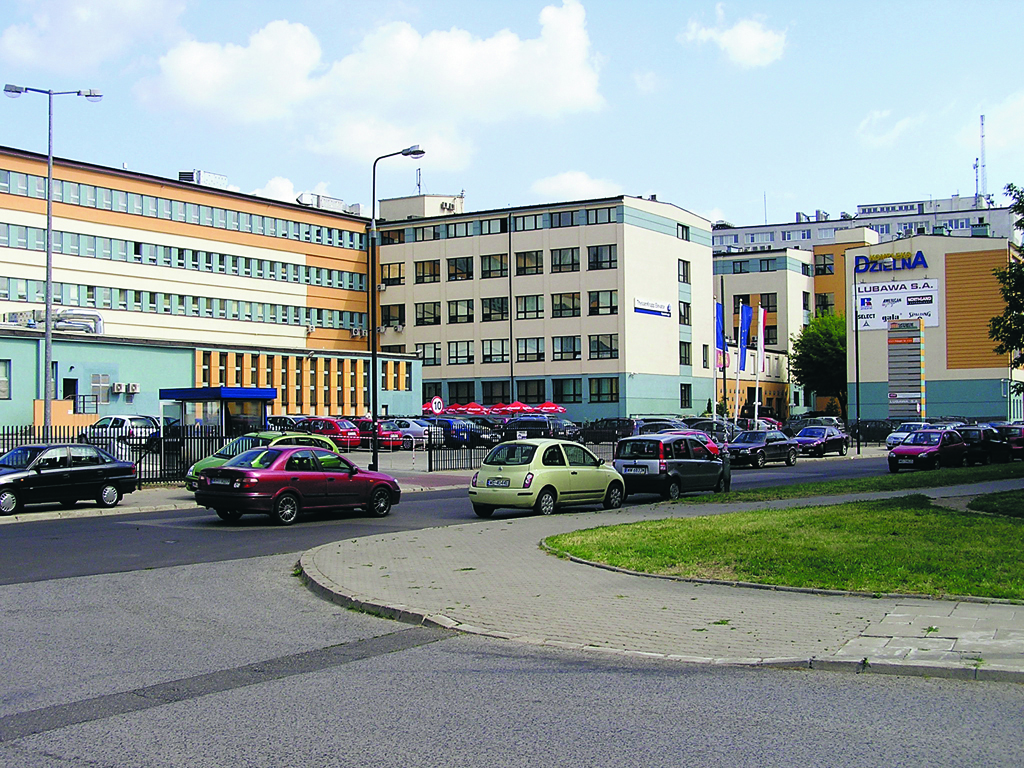
Former campus (pre-2019)

VIZJA has its main facilities in its Vizja Park Campus on 59 Okopowa Street, an educational complex operational since September 2019 and located in the Wola district of Warsaw. Vizja Park is over 30,000 square metres and is shared with a primary school and kindergarten. In 2025, the university expanded its facilities in Warsaw to the Babka Tower and the Wiśniowy Business Park.

Before 2019, VIZJA shared its facilities with the University of Information Technology on 55 Pawia Street, not far from its current location.

The main campus has 118 classrooms, eight computer rooms, a main auditorium with 463 seats and four other auditoriums. The university also has accommodation, a sports hall, gym and a ballet studio on campus.

Its specialized library has over 40,000 books and 300 journal series. It has two study rooms and 70 work stations. The university also has a psychological test laboratory with over 170 scientific tools.

VIZJA also has a branch in Sochaczew, which also has a library.

== Organization ==
The university comprises six departments, each overseen by a dean:

- School of Business
- School of Social Sciences
- School of Human Sciences
- School of Medical & Health Sciences
- School of Humanities & Fine Arts
- School of Computer Science & Technologies

It has two research units: the Doctoral School and the Scientific Council. Currently, there is one research center: the Genocide and Holocaust Center, established in 2020 as a Science Society for VIZJA students and elevated to an Academic Research status in 2022. The VIZJA Business Council was established in October 2020 and functions alongside the International Academic and Business Council.

There is also a student council, Samorząd Studencki AEH, sports club (Klub Sportowy AZS) and a Student Career Office. Alumni are connected through the Alumni Association, founded in June 2021.

In collaboration with the Polish Office for Personal Data Protection (Urząd Ochrony Danych Osobowych), VIZJA created the Institute of Personal Data Protection Law in Poland (Instytut Prawa Ochrony Danych Osobowych), the first institute in Poland dealing with data protection issues. Other institutes are the Pharmaceutical Care Institute (Instytut Opieki Farmaceutycznej), Polish Psychosexual Society (Polskie Towarzystwo Psychoseksuologiczne), Institute of the Health Care System (Instytut Systemu Ochrony Zdrowia), and the Institute of Intellectual Property and Medical Law (Instytut Własności Intelektualnej i Prawa Medycznego).

=== Governance ===
- Rector: dr hab. Konrad Janowski, prof.
  - Vice-Rector for International Cooperation: dr hab. Anna Llanos-Antczak, prof.
  - Vice-Rector for Research: dr hab. Marcin Staniewski, prof.
  - Vice-Rector for Education: dr hab. Piotr Szczepankowski, prof.

== Academic programs ==
VIZJA offers undergraduate and postgraduate degrees (including MEngs and MBAs) in Polish and English in 27 different fields of study. It is the first and only private university in Poland offering degrees in pharmacy, and is unique in Poland for its programs in Fashion Design & Sustainable Fashion Management, Social Media and Digital Marketing, and Psychotherapy. It also offers double degree programmes, summer schools, holiday courses and online degrees.

The university has a Doctoral Academy, and its doctoral school has been able to grant doctoral degrees in Psychology since January 2010. In the end of 2017, VIZJA was allowed to grant doctoral degrees in Legal Science, and since 2022 in Economics and Finance, and Political Science and Administration.

== Rankings ==
VIZJA was the most popular non-public university in Poland in the academic year 2024/2025. It ranked 1st for Best-Educated Academic Staff in Poland in the Perspektywy Ranking 2018. In 2023, it was ranked 5th in Publications among all Polish universities, with 2nd place for H-index and Citations in the AD Scientific Index 2024. The university was placed 5th among private universities, with 1st place in Internationalization for all Polish universities. In the 2023 Webometrics Ranking of World Universities, VIZJA was placed 3rd among Polish private universities.

As for 2025, the university is ranked 64th by QS World University Rankings for universities in Eastern Europe and in the top 5 for International Student Diversity in Europe. It is included in The Times Higher Education Impact Rankings 2023, ranking 301–400 internationally for Reducing inequalities.

The program "Administration" was placed 1st, "Psychology" and "Finance and Accounting" and "Management" 2nd, and "Law" 4th among private universities by Perspektywy.

== International Cooperation ==
VIZJA is one of the most international universities in Poland and Europe. As of 2023, it had over 5,000 international students from 124 different countries. It also participates in the Erasmus+ Programme. The university has 69 partner universities and offers international double degree programmes with the following partner universities:

- Ala-Too International University (Kyrgyzstan)
- Caucasus University (Georgia)
- International University of Kyrgyzstan (Kyrgyzstan)
- Eurasia International University (Armenia)
- International Black Sea University (Georgia)
- International University of Novi Pazar (Serbia)
- Kazakh University of Economics, Finance and International Trade (Kazakhstan)
- University of Prizren (Kosovo)
- Bedër University (Albania)
- Kyrgyz-German Institute of Applied Informatics (Kyrgyzstan)
- International Teaching University of Management and Communication AlterBridge (Georgia)
- East European University (Georgia)
- Georgian National University – SEU (Georgia)
- Public University "Kadri Zeka" (Kosovo)
- International Classical University of F. Orlik (Ukraine)

VIZJA offers student exchanges at the following partner universities:

- University of the Rosary (Colombia)
- University of Kuala Lumpur (Malaysia)
- Ala-Too International University (Kyrgyzstan)
- Vietnam National University, Hanoi (Vietnam)
- Troy University (USA)
- University of Applied Sciences Northwestern Switzerland (Switzerland)
- Ivano-Frankivsk National Technical University of Oil and Gas (Ukraine)
- Suleyman Demirel University (Kazakhstan)
- Tshwane University of Technology (South Africa)
- New Vision University (Georgia)
- Amity University Dubai (UAE)
- Jilin International Studies University (China)

Moreover, VIZJA runs a credit transfer program in cooperation with the following three partner universities:

- Centre for Study Overseas (China)
- Guivy Zaldastanishvili American Academy (Georgia)
- International Teaching University of Management and Communication AlterBridge (Georgia)

The university is member of the Central and East European Management Development Association and PRME (Principles for Responsible Management Education). It also cooperates with Fundación Beca, offering scholarships for Mexicans and Latin Americans, and Education Loan Fund, an agency of the Ministry of Education and Science of Mongolia.

== Publications ==
The university has a Publishing House which releases publications on an open-access basis. In 2023, it was ranked 5th in Publications among all Polish universities.

VIZJA publishes three journals:

- Advances in Cognitive Psychology, since 2005
- Contemporary Economics, since 2007
- Lumen Poloniae, on contemporary and Polish philosophy, since 2007

== Notable people ==
=== Alumni ===
- Mariusz Kałużny (born 1986), politician serving as a member of the Sejm since 2019
- Łukasz Piebiak (born 1976), Polish judge and Deputy Minister of Justice of Poland (2015–2019)
- Beata Rutkiewicz (born 1977), Polish politician and manager; voivode of the Pomeranian Voivodeship (since 2023)

=== Staff ===
- Małgorzata Bartyzel (1955–2016), Polish politician
- Marek Kosewski (1941–2020), Polish psychologist
- Zbigniew Lew-Starowicz (1943–2024), Polish psychiatrist and psychotherapist, expert in sexology and national consultant in this field
- Marek Niechciał (1969), Polish economist and civil servant
- Marian Orzechowski (1931–2020), Polish politician who served as Minister of Foreign Affairs from 1985 to 1988
- Konrad Talmont-Kamiński (born 1971), Polish analytic philosopher and cognitive scientist
