= Łapino =

- Village
- Location within Poland
- Coordinates: 54°17′23″N 18°26′39″E
- Country: Poland
- Voivodeship: Pomeranian
- County: Gdańsk
- Gmina: Kolbudy
- Population: 537

Łapino [waˈpinɔ] is a village in the administrative district of Gmina Kolbudy, within Gdańsk County, Pomeranian Voivodeship, in northern Poland.

For details of the history of the region, see History of Pomerania.
