= Kolbudy =

Village in Poland

Kolbudy Kôlbùdë
- Village
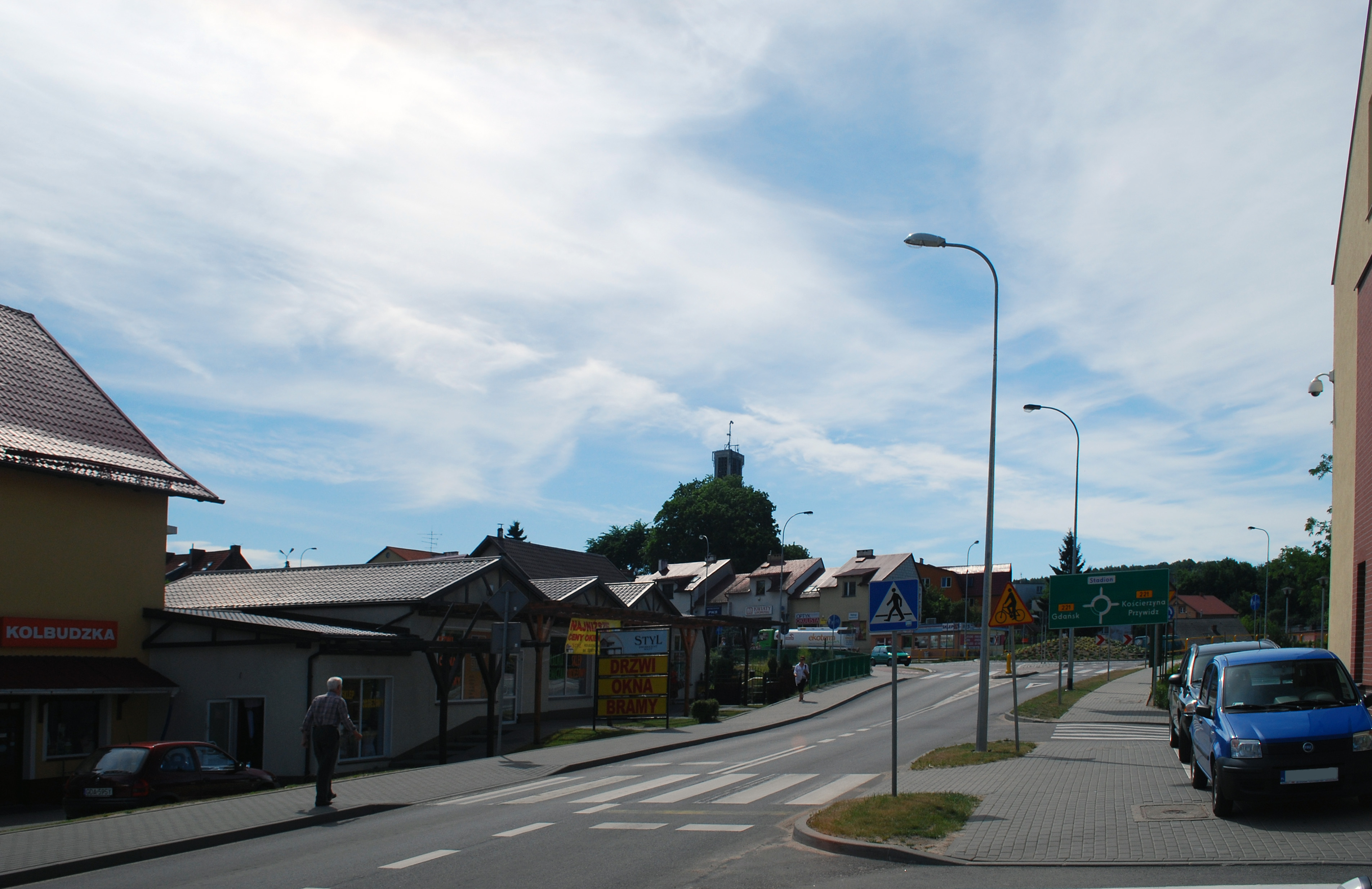

- Coat of arms

- Location within Poland
- Coordinates: 54°16′15″N 18°28′20″E
- Country: Poland
- Voivodeship: Pomeranian
- County: Gdańsk
- Gmina: Kolbudy
- Population: 3,628
- SIMC: 0163950
- Website: kolbudy.pl

Kolbudy [kɔlˈbudɨ] (Kashubian: Kôlbùdë; German: Ober Kahlbude) is a village in Gdańsk County, Pomeranian Voivodeship, in northern Poland. It is the seat of the gmina (administrative district) called Gmina Kolbudy.

For details of the history of the region, see History of Pomerania.
