= Marek Kosewski =

Polish psychologist

Marek Kosewski (born 14 June 1941 in Warsaw, died 13 August 2020) was a Polish psychologist, habilitated doctor, and academic lecturer.

== Biography ==
In 1977, by resolution of the Faculty of Philosophy and History of the Jagiellonian University, he obtained a doctoral degree in the humanities. By resolution of the same Faculty Council in 1987, he received his habilitation in humanities in the field of psychology. He was the head of the Institute of Value-Based Management at the Academy of Economics and Humanities in Warsaw (now VIZJA University).

He was interested in the psychology of aggression and the application of this knowledge to social pathology, crime, and rehabilitation issues. In the 1980s, he studied human behavior in situations of temptation and humiliation. In the mid-1990s, he developed a model of dignity regulation of behavior, briefly called the "anomie – ethos" theory, and began applying it to issues of workplace temptation and corruption. He later developed training programs in dignity assertiveness and training for administration and business needs. His research interests included the issue of power (of managers, parents, and teachers) over others and changes that cause two different ways of exercising power: creating a "control situation" and generating a "humiliation situation."

== Selected publications ==
- Wartości, godność i władza, Vizja Press&IT, Warsaw, 2008.
- Układy. O tym, dlaczego uczciwi ludzie czasami kradną, a złodzieje ujmują się honorem, University of Finance and Management Publishing House, Warsaw, 2007.
- Ludzie w sytuacjach pokusy i upokorzenia, Wiedza Powszechna, Warsaw, 1985.
- Psychologiczne Problemy Profilaktyki Społecznej i Resocjalizacji. Teoria reaktywnych i autonomicznych zachowań przestępczych, IPSiR Papers, Vol. 8, Warsaw, 1983.
- Agresywni Przestępcy, Wiedza Powszechna, Warsaw, 1977.
