= Błotnia, Pomeranian Voivodeship =

Błotnia
- Village
- Location within Poland
- Coordinates: 54°10′31″N 18°24′1″E
- Country: Poland
- Voivodeship: Pomeranian
- County: Gdańsk
- Gmina: Trąbki Wielkie
- Population: 187

Błotnia [ˈbwɔtɲa] is a village in the administrative district of Gmina Trąbki Wielkie, within Gdańsk County, Pomeranian Voivodeship, in northern Poland. The name of Błotnia was Braunsdorf (County Danzig, Free City of Danzig) till the end of World War II.

For details of the history of the region, see History of Pomerania.

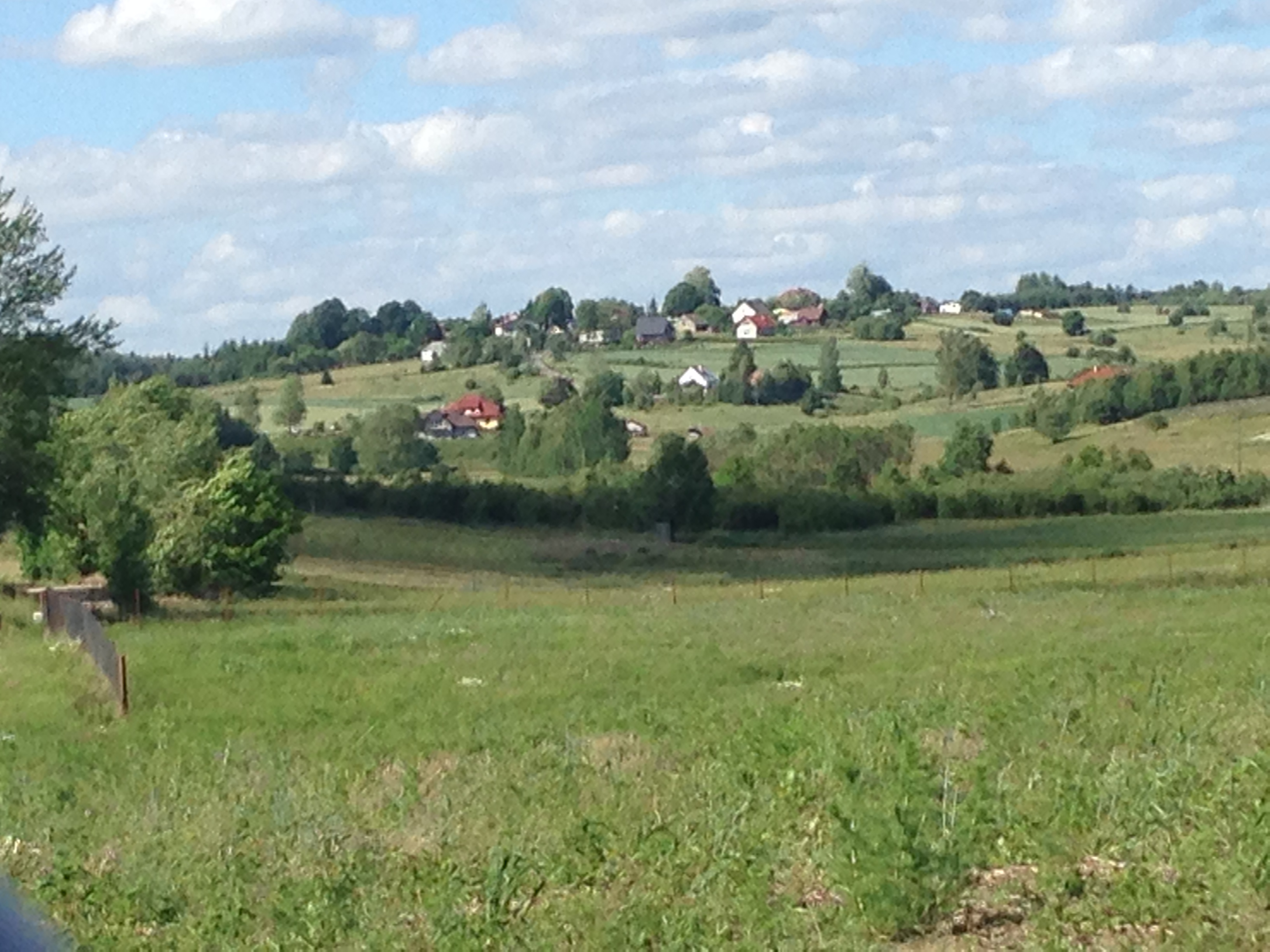
Blotnia (Braunsdorf), Poland
