= Gołębiewo Wielkie =

Village in Kociewie

- Village
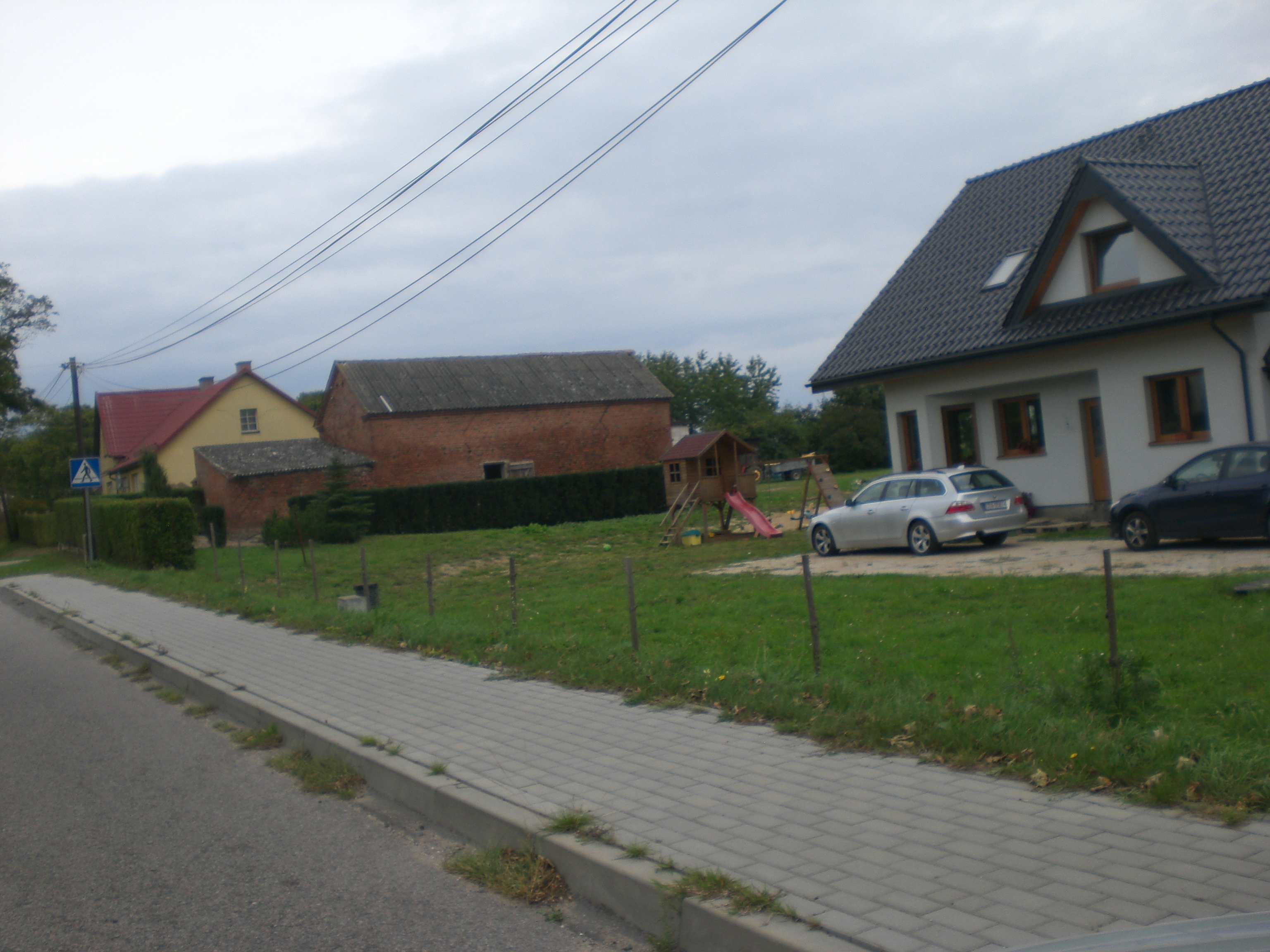

- Location within Poland
- Coordinates: 54°8′41″N 18°32′54″E
- Country: Poland
- Voivodeship: Pomeranian
- County: Gdańsk
- Gmina: Trąbki Wielkie
- Population: 646

Gołębiewo Wielkie [ɡɔwɛmˈbjɛvɔ] is a village in the administrative district of Gmina Trąbki Wielkie, within Gdańsk County, Pomeranian Voivodeship, in northern Poland.

For details of the history of the region, see History of Pomerania.
