= Rościszewko =

Village in Kociewie

- Village
- Location within Poland
- Coordinates: 54°7′46″N 18°34′38″E
- Country: Poland
- Voivodeship: Pomeranian
- County: Gdańsk
- Gmina: Trąbki Wielkie
- Population: 31
- Time zone: UTC+1 (CET)
  - Summer (DST): UTC+2 (CEST)

Rościszewko [rɔɕt͡ɕiˈʂɛfkɔ] is a village in the administrative district of Gmina Trąbki Wielkie, within Gdańsk County, Pomeranian Voivodeship, in northern Poland. It is located within the ethnocultural region of Kociewie in the historic region of Pomerania.

Rościszewko was a royal village of the Polish Crown, administratively located in the Tczew County in the Pomeranian Voivodeship.
