= Parish of Blessed Jerzy Popiełuszko =

Parish of Blessed Jerzy Popiełuszko may refer to:

- Parish of Blessed Jerzy Popiełuszko (Ełganów)
- Parish of Blessed Jerzy Popiełuszko (Juszków)
- Parish of Blessed Jerzy Popiełuszko (Kraków)
- Parish of Blessed Jerzy Popiełuszko (Mysiadło)

== See also ==
- Popieluszko (disambiguation)
- Jerzy Popiełuszko
