= Parish of Blessed Jerzy Popiełuszko (Ełganów) =

Parish in Ełganów, Poland

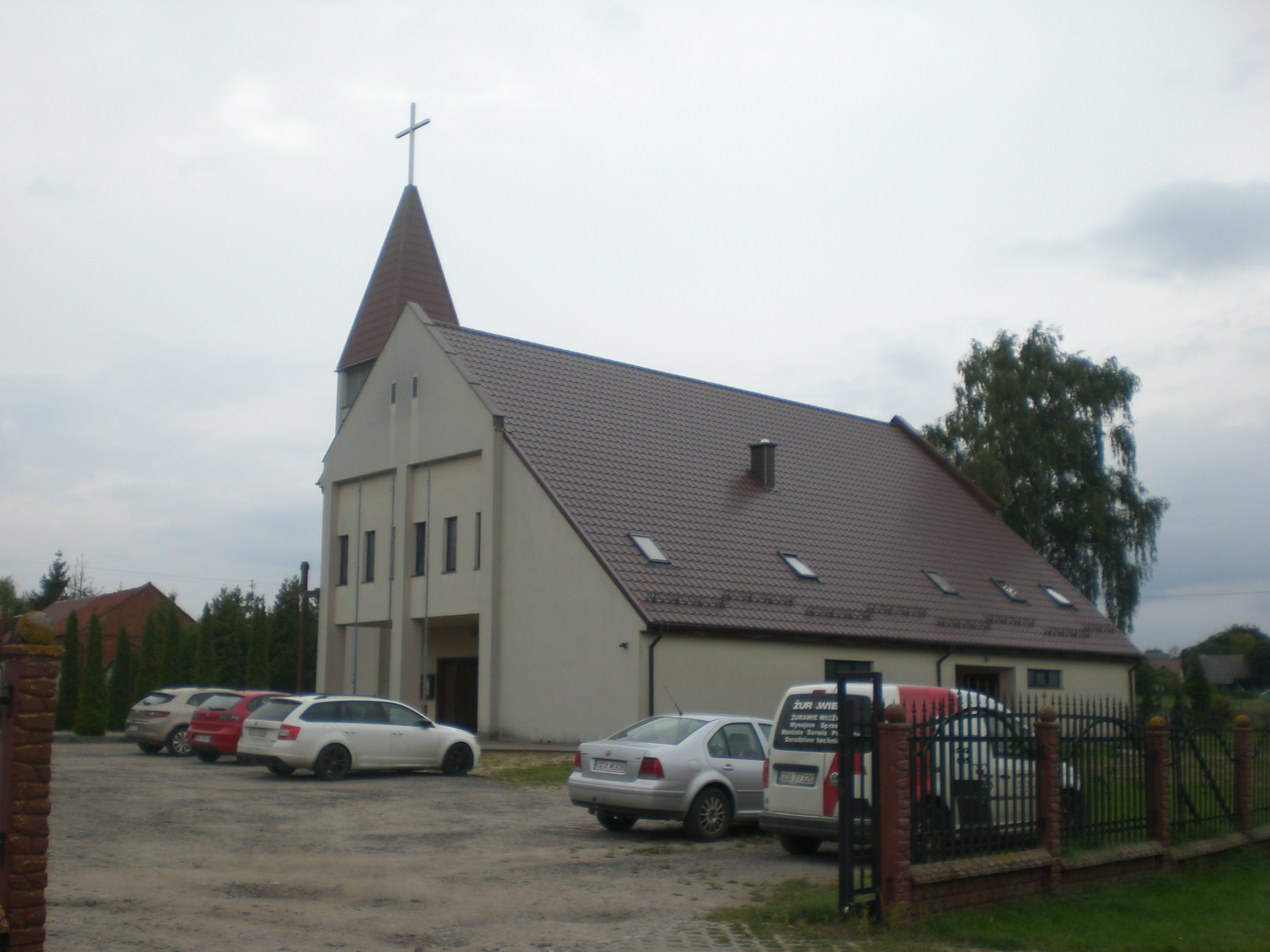
Parish of Blessed Jerzy Popiełuszko in Ełganowo

The Parish of Blessed Jerzy Popiełuszko, Priest and Martyr in Ełganowo is a Roman Catholic parish located in the village of Ełganowo, on Szkolna Street in the municipality of Trąbki Wielkie. It is part of the Trąbki Wielkie deanery in the Archdiocese of Gdańsk.

== History ==
- 3 May 2009 – consecration of the construction site;
- April 2010 – the first shovel was put into the ground for construction work;
- 2011 – work was dynamic and progress was very rapid, resulting in the church being built at an impressive pace – in a year and a half;
- 27 November 2011 – Consecration of the church by the Archbishop of Gdańsk, Sławoj Leszek Głódź;
- 19 February 2012 – appointment of the former deputy director of Caritas Gdańsk, Rev. Bolesław Antoniów, MA, as rector of the branch church;
- 14 April 2015 – Fr. Jarosław Brylowski becomes the new rector of the church; Between 2011 and 2020, the branch church was subordinate to the parish church of the Assumption of the Blessed Virgin Mary in Trąbki Wielkie;
- 23 April 2020 – Archbishop Sławoj Leszek Głódź, Metropolitan of Gdańsk, established the parish by episcopal decree and appointed the current rector as parish priest.

== Parish priests ==
- 2012–2015: Canon Bolesław Antoniów, MA[1]
  - Rector
- since 23 April 2020: Rev. Jarosław Brylowski
  - Diocesan chaplain for children since 29 November 2022
  - Vice-Dean since 8 May 2020
  - Rector (2015–2020)
