= Postołowo, Pomeranian Voivodeship =

Village in Kociewie

Postołowo
- Village
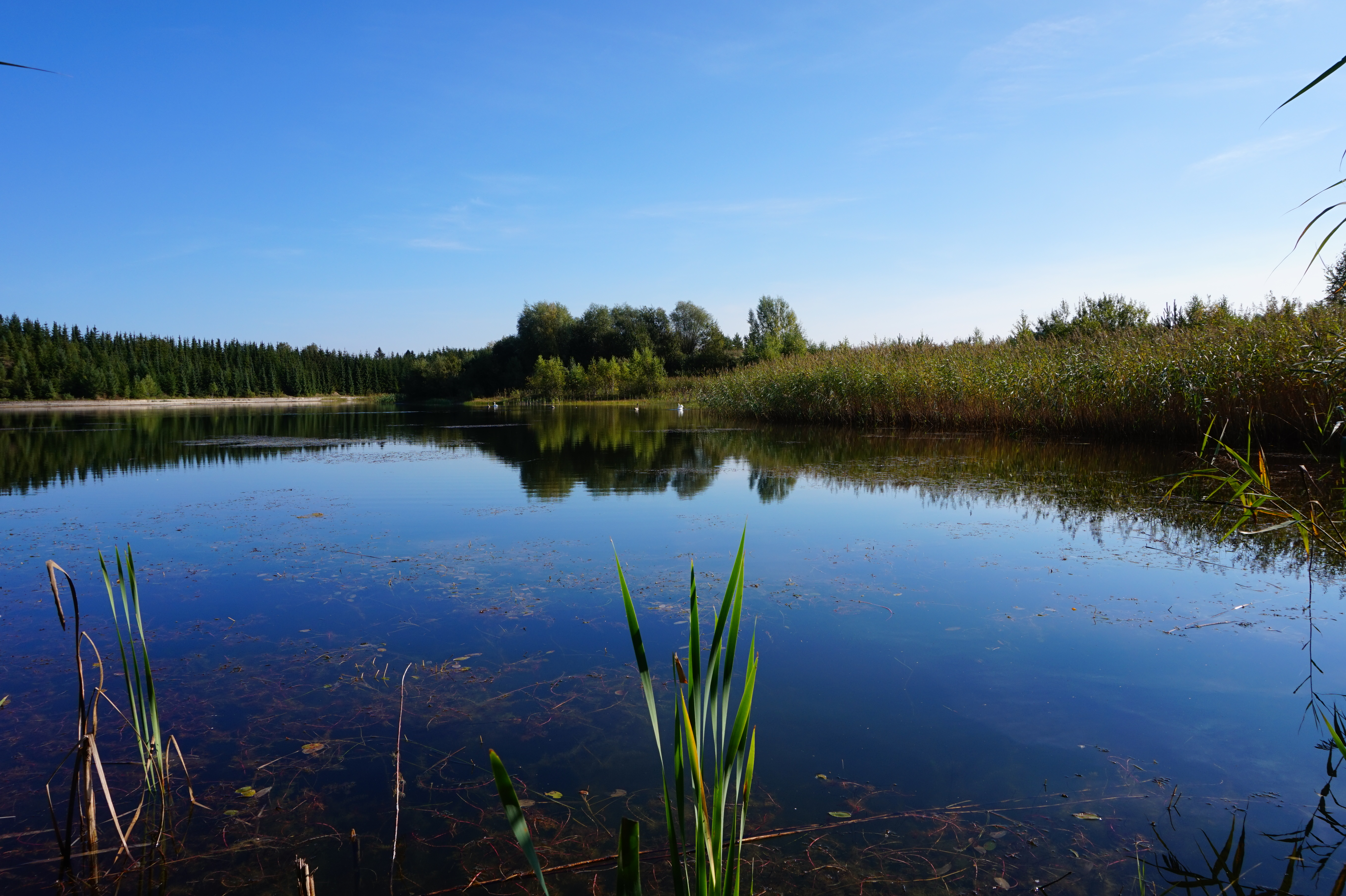
- Lake in Postołowo

- Location within Poland
- Coordinates: 54°7′53″N 18°27′53″E
- Country: Poland
- Voivodeship: Pomeranian
- County: Gdańsk
- Gmina: Trąbki Wielkie
- Population: 203
- Time zone: UTC+1 (CET)
  - Summer (DST): UTC+2 (CEST)

Postołowo [pɔstɔˈwɔvɔ] is a village in the administrative district of Gmina Trąbki Wielkie, within Gdańsk County, Pomeranian Voivodeship, in northern Poland. It is located within the historic region of Pomerania.

Postołowo was a royal village of the Polish Crown, administratively located in the Tczew County in the Pomeranian Voivodeship.
