= Gołębiewo Średnie =

Village in Kociewie

- Village
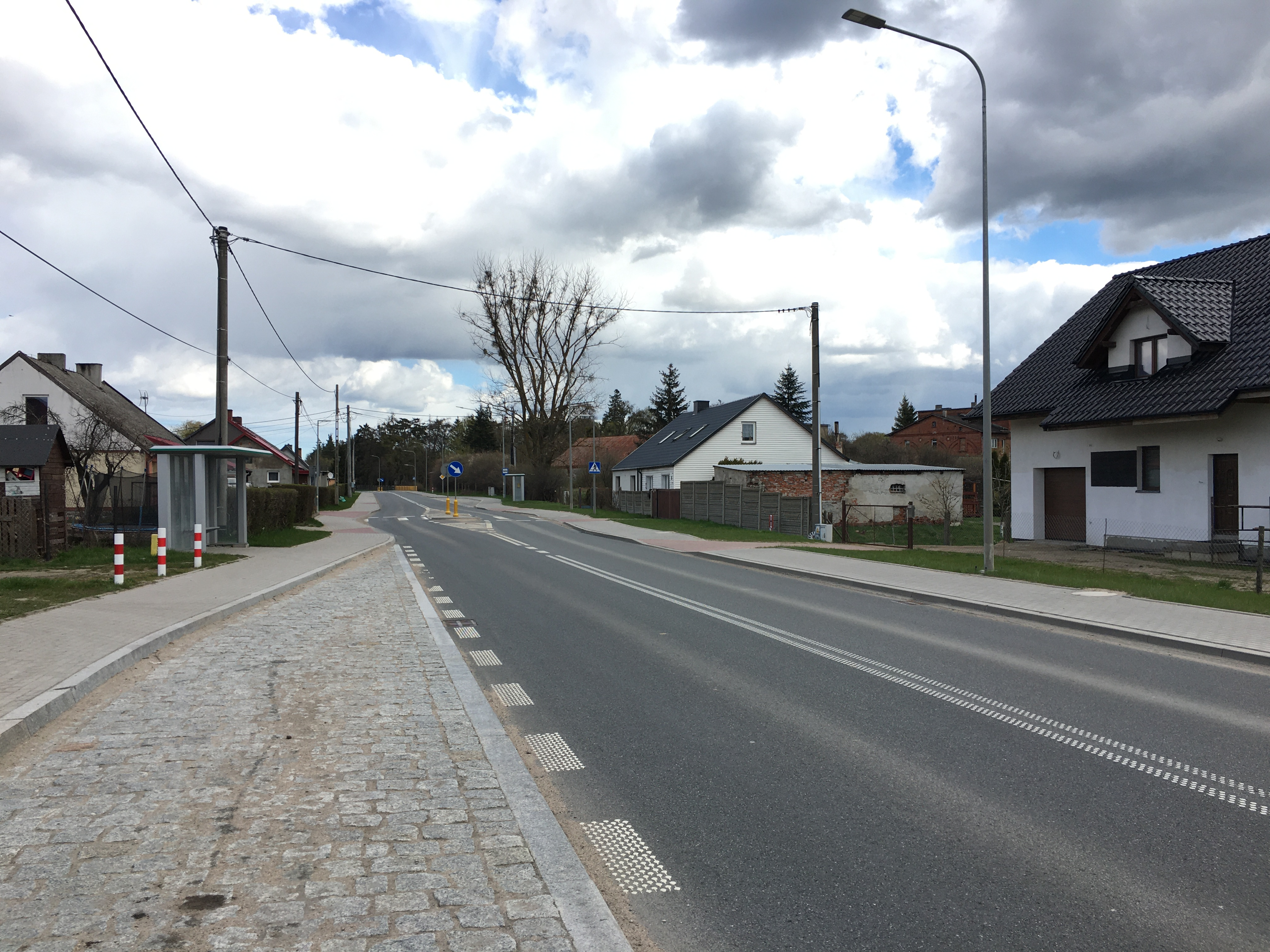

- Location within Poland
- Coordinates: 54°8′13″N 18°32′20″E
- Country: Poland
- Voivodeship: Pomeranian
- County: Gdańsk
- Gmina: Trąbki Wielkie
- Population: 270

Gołębiewo Średnie [ɡɔwɛmˈbjɛvɔ ˈɕrɛdɲɛ] is a village in the administrative district of Gmina Trąbki Wielkie, within Gdańsk County, Pomeranian Voivodeship, in northern Poland.

For details of the history of the region, see History of Pomerania.
