= Pawłowo, Gdańsk County =

Village in Kociewie

Pawłowo
- Village
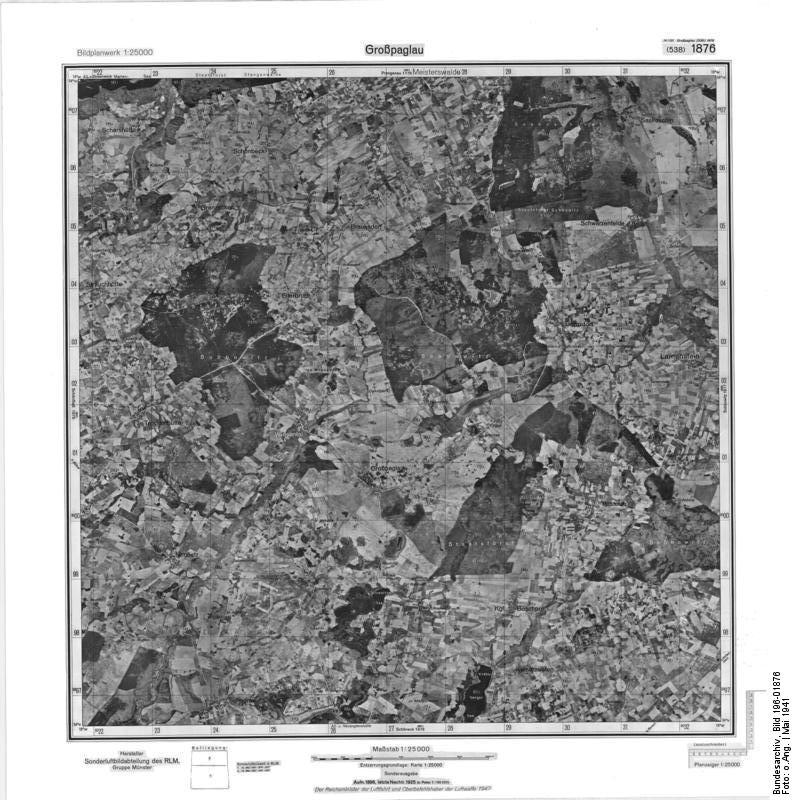
- Historical map of the village labelled in German as Großpaglau

- Location within Poland
- Coordinates: 54°8′3″N 18°24′26″E
- Country: Poland
- Voivodeship: Pomeranian
- County: Gdańsk
- Gmina: Trąbki Wielkie
- Population: 371

Pawłowo [paˈvwɔvɔ] (German: Großpaglau) is a village in the administrative district of Gmina Trąbki Wielkie, within Gdańsk County, Pomeranian Voivodeship, in northern Poland.

For details of the history of the region, see History of Pomerania.
