= Domachowo, Pomeranian Voivodeship =

Domachowo
- Village
- Location within Poland
- Coordinates: 54°12′34″N 18°27′44″E
- Country: Poland
- Voivodeship: Pomeranian
- County: Gdańsk
- Gmina: Trąbki Wielkie

Population
  - Total: 474
- Time zone: UTC+1 (CET)
  - Summer (DST): UTC+2 (CEST)
- Vehicle registration: GDA

Domachowo [dɔmaˈxɔvɔ] is a village in the administrative district of Gmina Trąbki Wielkie, within Gdańsk County, Pomeranian Voivodeship, in northern Poland. It is located in the historic region of Pomerania.

== History ==
Domachowo was a private village of Polish nobility, including the Hertmański, Prądzyński and Zboiński families.

During the German occupation in World War II, in 1940, a subcamp of the Stutthof concentration camp was established in the village.
