= Ty 9785 =

German narrow-gauge steam locomotive used in Poland

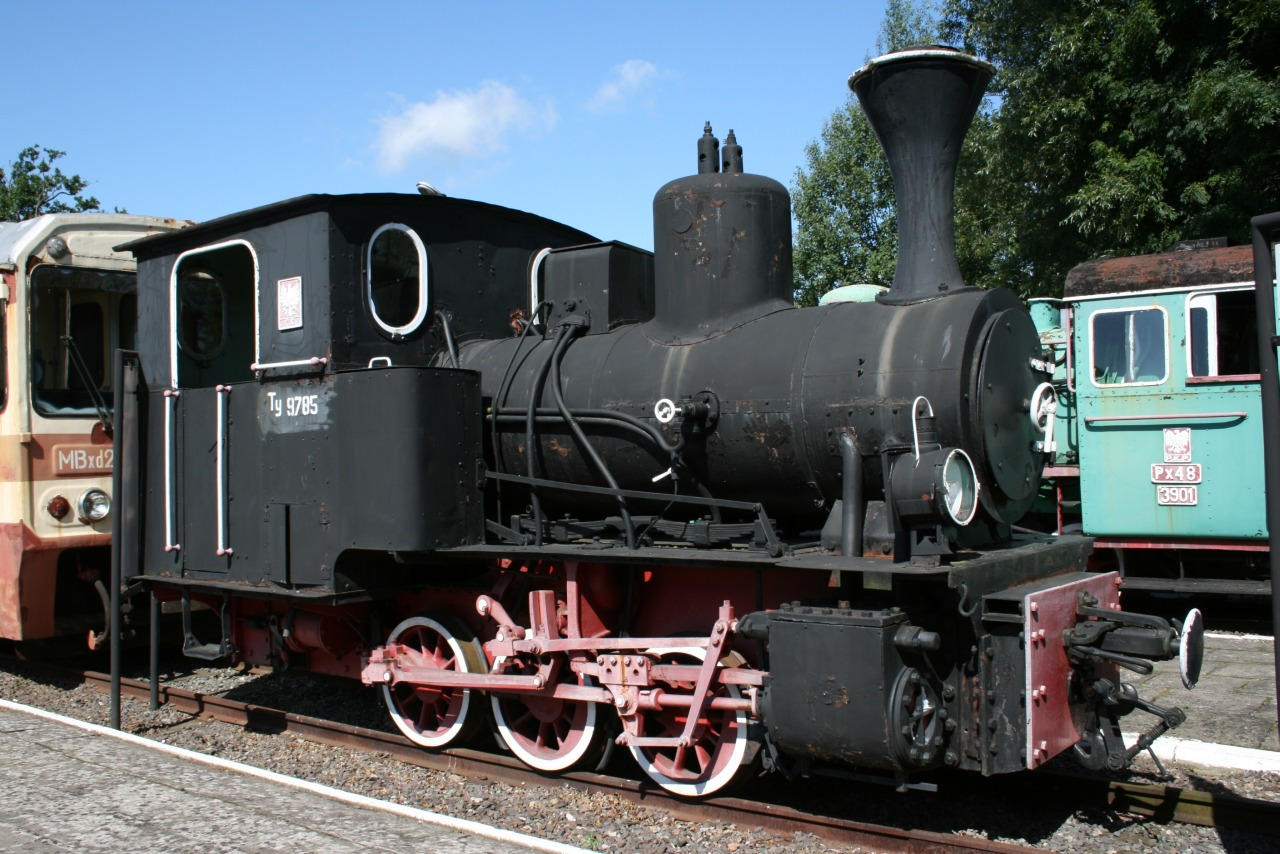
Type and origin
- Power type: Steam
- Builder: (Germany) Orenstein & Koppel, Berlin-Drewitz
- Build date: 1921
Specifications
- Configuration
  - Whyte: 0-6-0T (Cn2t)
- Gauge: 1,000 mm (39 in) (previously 780 mm (31 in))
- Wheelbase
  - Drivers: 700 mm (28 in)
- Length: 5,850 mm (230 in)
- Width: 2,100 mm (83 in)
- Height: 3,010 mm (119 in)
- Axle load: 1,600 mm (63 in)
- Empty weight: 10 t (9.8 long tons; 11 short tons)
- Service weight: 12.3 t (12.1 long tons; 13.6 short tons)
- Fuel capacity: 0.6 t (0.59 long tons; 0.66 short tons)
- Water cap.: 1.7 m^{3} (60 cu ft)
- Firebox
  - Grate area: 0.45 m^{2} (4.8 sq ft)
- Boiler pressure: 12 atm
- Heating surface
  - Firebox: 23.5 m^{2} (253 sq ft)
- Piston stroke: 350 mm (14 in)
Performance figures
- Maximum speed: 25 km/h (16 mph)
- Power output: 70 hp (52 kW)
- Tractive effort: 1,728 kg (3,810 lb)

The Ty 9785 is an industrial narrow-gauge steam locomotive and tank locomotive designed for a track gauge of 1,000 mm, with a 0-6-0T wheel arrangement (Cn2t). Built in 1921 by the German manufacturer Orenstein & Koppel (serial number 9785), it was used in Poland at the Gryfice Sugar Refinery and is now preserved for museum purposes.

== History ==
The locomotive was constructed in September 1921 by Orenstein & Koppel in Berlin-Drewitz and purchased by the Sobbowitz Sugar Refinery (now Sobowidz, then part of the Free City of Danzig). Initially designed for a 780 mm gauge, it served the refinery's sugar beet railway. The locomotive operated under its factory serial number, 9785, which was adopted as its operational number.

After World War II, the locomotive was acquired by the Gryfice Sugar Refinery on Poland's Recovered Territories. Between 1947 and 1949, it was overhauled and converted to a 1,000 mm gauge in the refinery's workshops. It was used for internal transport within the refinery and to service the transfer point between the refinery's siding and the Polish State Railways network.

In 1972, the locomotive was retired from service. On 12 June 1979, it was donated to the Warsaw Railway Museum, and since then, it has been displayed at the Permanent Exhibition of the Seaside Narrow-Gauge Railway in Gryfice. Its current designation, Ty 9785, derives from its factory serial number and the Polish State Railways' nomenclature for tank locomotives with a 0-6-0 wheel arrangement. In 2009, during a restoration, the heavily corroded driver's cab and boiler cladding were fully reconstructed.

== Design ==
The Ty 9785 is a narrow-gauge tank locomotive with a 0-6-0T wheel arrangement, powered by a twin-cylinder saturated steam engine (Cn2t). The driver's cab was open on the sides with low doors. The water tank, located within the frame, held 1.7 m³, and the coal bunker in the cab had a capacity of 0.6 t.

The boiler was a fire-tube design with a copper hearth, which was replaced with a steel one during a repair in the 1950s at ZNTK in Nowy Sącz. A tall steam dome on the boiler barrel housed a valve-type throttle with internal drive. Two Orenstein-type safety valves were mounted on the dome. A hand-operated sandbox was positioned behind the steam dome, delivering sand to the middle axle. Water was supplied by two Schau-type suction-pressure injectors (60 l/min each). The boiler fittings were of German origin, including a tubular water gauge and test cocks. The chimney was flared, typical of Orenstein & Koppel locomotives, with an internal spark arrester. The smokebox had round doors secured with a central rotary lock.

The frame was an internal plate design with 14 mm thick frame plates, supported by three-point suspension springs. The three coupled axles were fixed (axle spacing 1,600 mm, 800 mm between axles), with an axle load of 4.1 t. The locomotive could navigate curves with a minimum radius of 35 m.

The locomotive used a twin-cylinder steam engine with flat slide valves. Power was transmitted to the third coupled axle via single-guide crossheads. It featured a Heusinger valve gear with an Orenstein & Koppel patented suspended slide valve rod and a lever-operated reverser. Braking included a steam brake and a hand-operated lever brake, both acting on a common brake shaft connected to the outer axles. Lighting was provided by oil lamps. The locomotive was equipped with central buffers and a yoke-type coupling, plus draw hooks with screw couplers under the buffers for compatibility with the rolling stock of the Seaside Narrow-Gauge Railway.
