= Wymysłowo =

Wymysłowo may refer to the following places:

- Wymysłowo, Grudziądz County in Kuyavian-Pomeranian Voivodeship (north-central Poland)
- Wymysłowo, Nakło County in Kuyavian-Pomeranian Voivodeship (north-central Poland)
- Wymysłowo, Toruń County in Kuyavian-Pomeranian Voivodeship (north-central Poland)
- Wymysłowo, Sępólno County in Kuyavian-Pomeranian Voivodeship (north-central Poland)
- Wymysłowo, Gniezno County in Greater Poland Voivodeship (west-central Poland)
- Wymysłowo, Gostyń County in Greater Poland Voivodeship (west-central Poland)
- Wymysłowo, Konin County in Greater Poland Voivodeship (west-central Poland)
- Wymysłowo, Kościan County in Greater Poland Voivodeship (west-central Poland)
- Wymysłowo, Oborniki County in Greater Poland Voivodeship (west-central Poland)
- Wymysłowo, Wągrowiec County in Greater Poland Voivodeship (west-central Poland)
- Wymysłowo, Gdańsk County in Pomeranian Voivodeship (north Poland)
- Wymysłowo, Starogard County in Pomeranian Voivodeship (north Poland)
