= Mierzeszyn =

- Village
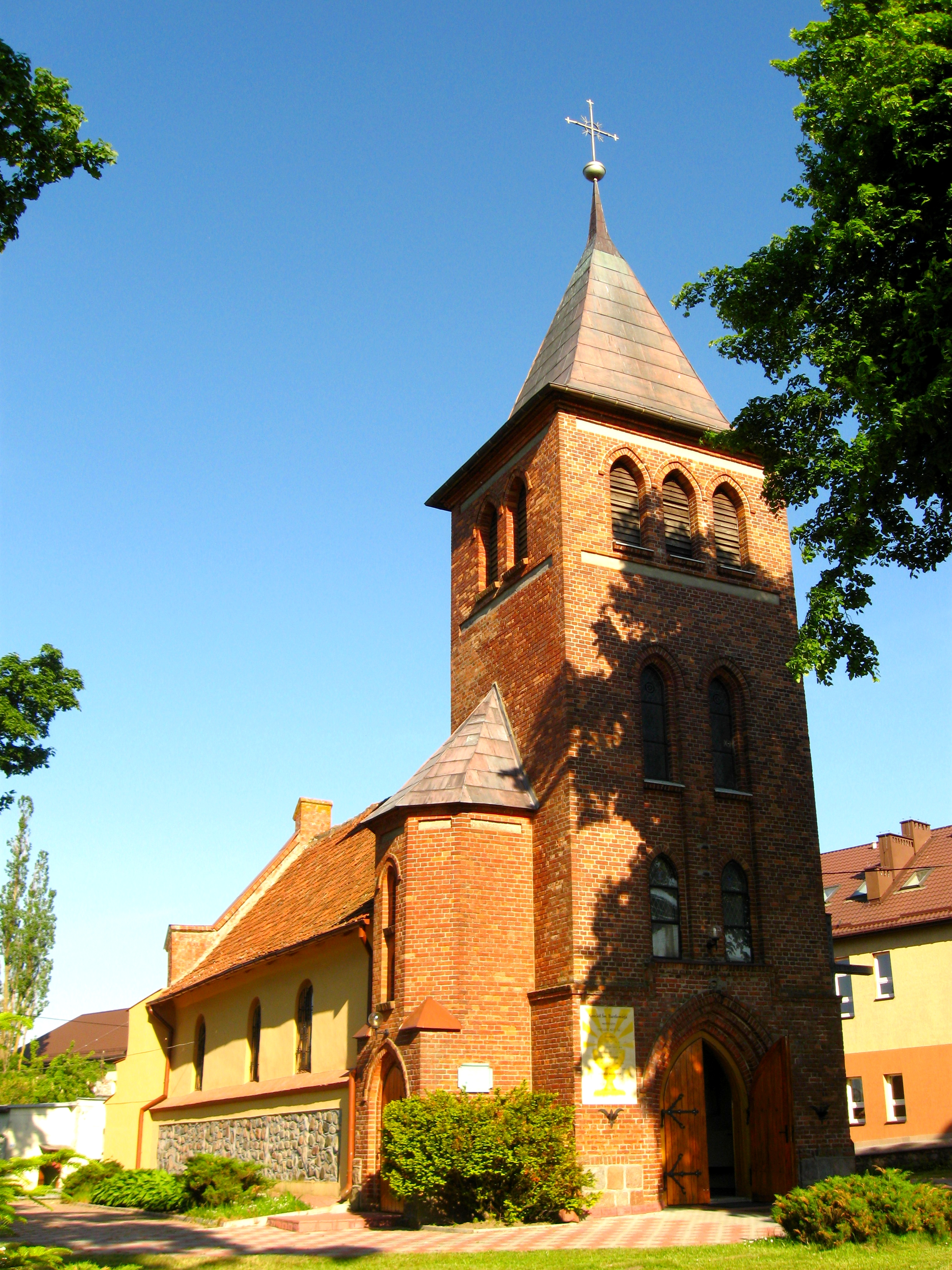
- Saint Bartholomew's Church in Mierzeszyn

- Coat of arms

- Location within Poland
- Coordinates: 54°12′8″N 18°25′1″E
- Country: Poland
- Voivodeship: Pomeranian
- County: Gdańsk
- Gmina: Trąbki Wielkie
- Population: 800
- Time zone: UTC+1 (CET)
  - Summer (DST): UTC+2 (CEST)

Mierzeszyn [mjɛˈʐɛʂɨn] is a village in the administrative district of Gmina Trąbki Wielkie, within Gdańsk County, Pomeranian Voivodeship, in northern Poland. It is located within the historic region of Pomerania.

Mierzeszyn was a royal village of the Polish Crown, administratively located in the Tczew County in the Pomeranian Voivodeship. In the past it was also called Miereszyn (1686), Miereszczyn (1717), and Mierzyszyn.

During the World War II, on November 17, 1939, the Germans murdered the local Polish priest in the nearby village of Nowy Wiec (see Intelligenzaktion).

There are two historic churches in the village: the Saint Bartholomew's Church and the Church of the Sacred Heart of Jesus.
