= Kleszczewo, Gdańsk County =

Kleszczewo
- Village
- Location within Poland
- Coordinates: 54°11′34″N 18°31′20″E
- Country: Poland
- Voivodeship: Pomeranian
- County: Gdańsk
- Gmina: Trąbki Wielkie
- Population: 628

Kleszczewo [klɛʂˈt͡ʂɛvɔ] is a village in the administrative district of Gmina Trąbki Wielkie, within Gdańsk County, Pomeranian Voivodeship, in northern Poland.

For details of the history of the region, see History of Pomerania.
