= Zła Wieś, Pomeranian Voivodeship =

Zła Wieś
- Village
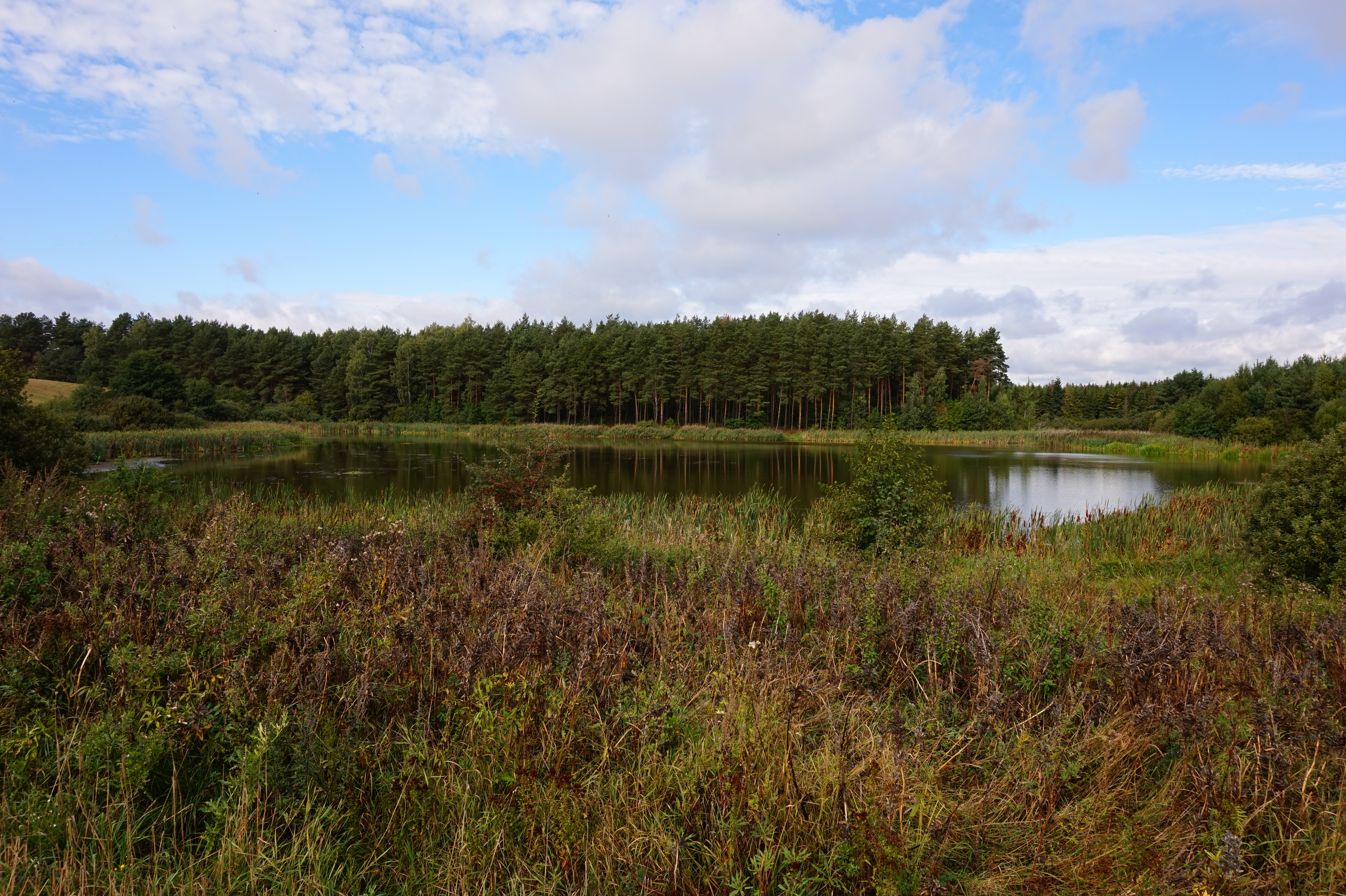
- Zła wieś

- Location within Poland
- Coordinates: 54°11′29″N 18°36′2″E
- Country: Poland
- Voivodeship: Pomeranian
- County: Gdańsk
- Gmina: Trąbki Wielkie
- Population: 141 (2,008)
- Time zone: UTC+1 (CET)
  - Summer (DST): UTC+2 (CEST)
- Vehicle registration: GDA

Zła Wieś [zwa vjɛɕ] is a village in the administrative district of Gmina Trąbki Wielkie, within Gdańsk County, Pomeranian Voivodeship, in northern Poland. It is located within the historic region of Pomerania.

Zła Wieś was a private church village of the monastery in Ląd, administratively located in the Tczew County in the Pomeranian Voivodeship of the Polish Crown.

== Transport ==
The Polish A1 motorway runs nearby, east of the village.
