= Drzewina =

- Village
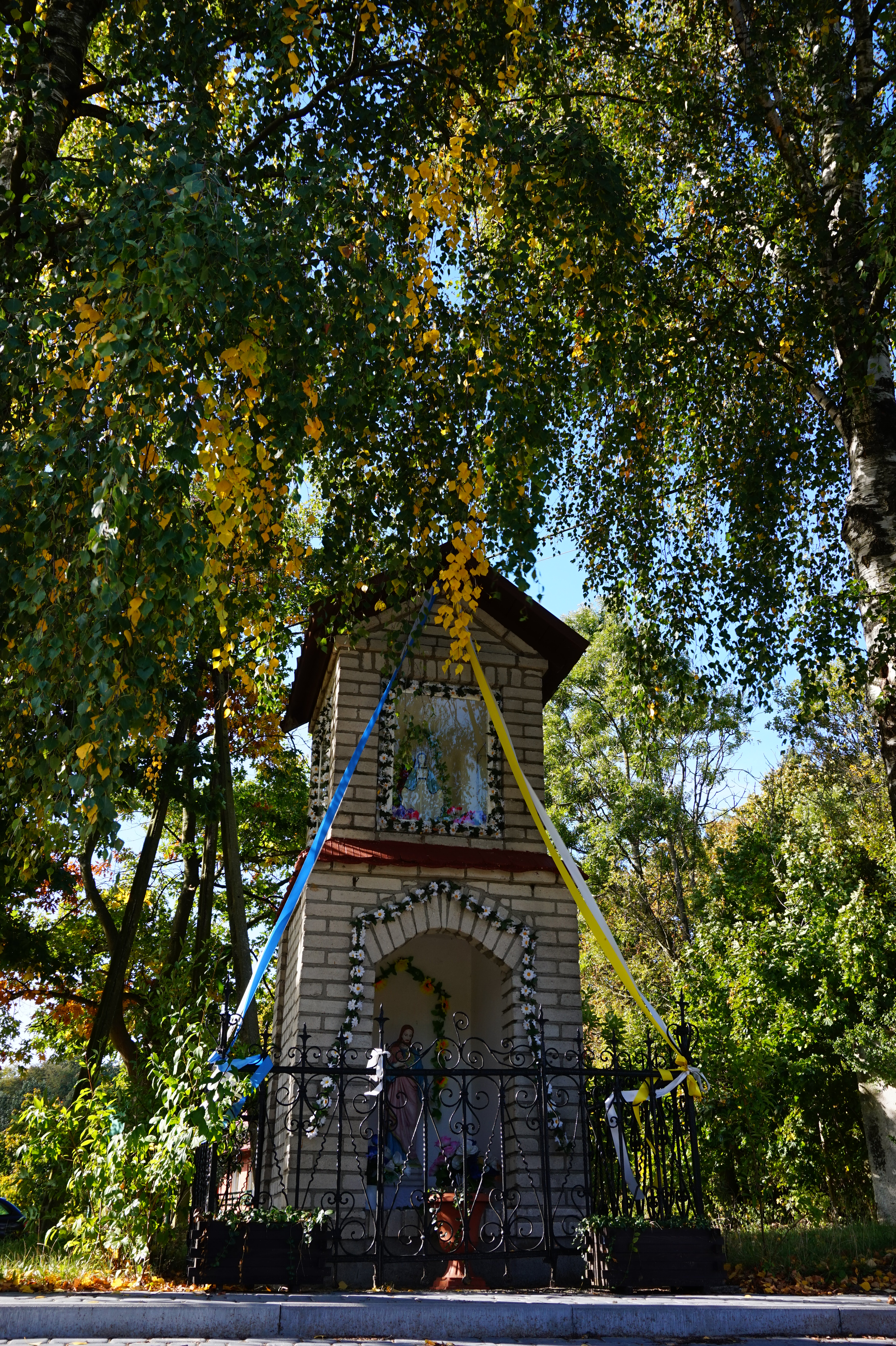
- Wayside shrine in Drzewina

- Location within Poland
- Coordinates: 54°8′40″N 18°23′18″E
- Country: Poland
- Voivodeship: Pomeranian
- County: Gdańsk
- Gmina: Trąbki Wielkie
- Population: 120
- Time zone: UTC+1 (CET)
  - Summer (DST): UTC+2 (CEST)

Drzewina [dʐɛˈvina] is a village in the administrative district of Gmina Trąbki Wielkie, within Gdańsk County, Pomeranian Voivodeship, in northern Poland. It is located within the historic region of Pomerania.

Drzewina was a royal village of the Polish Crown, administratively located in the Tczew County in the Pomeranian Voivodeship. It was annexed by Prussia in the First Partition of Poland in 1772, and restored to Poland, after Poland regained independence in 1918.
