= Łaguszewo =

- Village
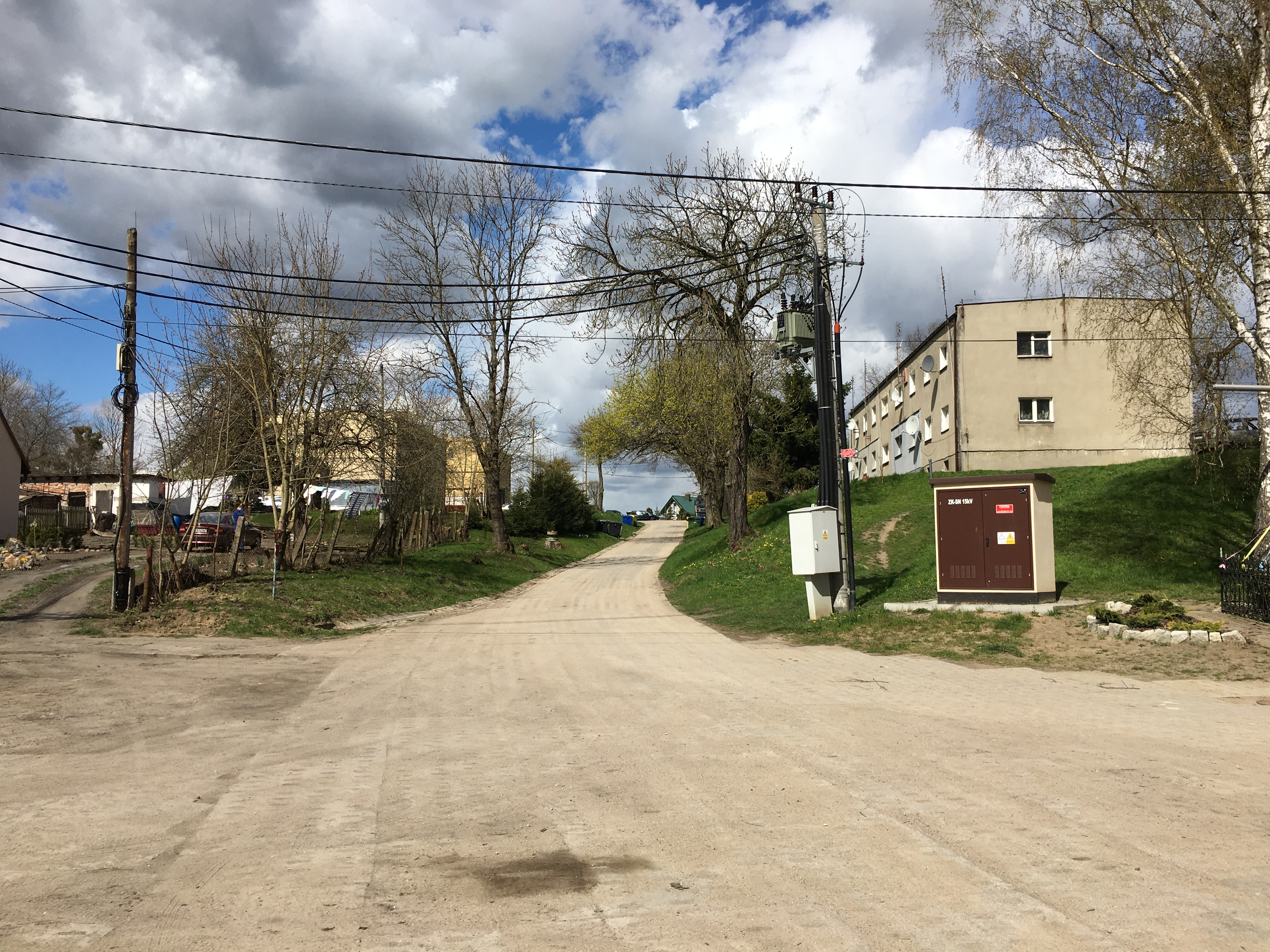

- Location within Poland
- Coordinates: 54°10′25″N 18°35′38″E
- Country: Poland
- Voivodeship: Pomeranian
- County: Gdańsk
- Gmina: Trąbki Wielkie
- Population: 204

Łaguszewo [waɡuˈʂɛvɔ] is a village in the administrative district of Gmina Trąbki Wielkie, within Gdańsk County, Pomeranian Voivodeship, in northern Poland.

For details of the history of the region, see History of Pomerania.
