= Steblewo =

- Village
- Location within Poland
- Coordinates: 54°10′37″N 18°49′47″E
- Country: Poland
- Voivodeship: Pomeranian
- County: Gdańsk
- Gmina: Suchy Dąb
- Population: 410

Steblewo [stɛˈblɛvɔ] is a village in the administrative district of Gmina Suchy Dąb, within Gdańsk County, Pomeranian Voivodeship, in northern Poland.

For details of the history of the region, see History of Pomerania.
