= Kłodawa, Gdańsk County =

Kłodawa
- Village
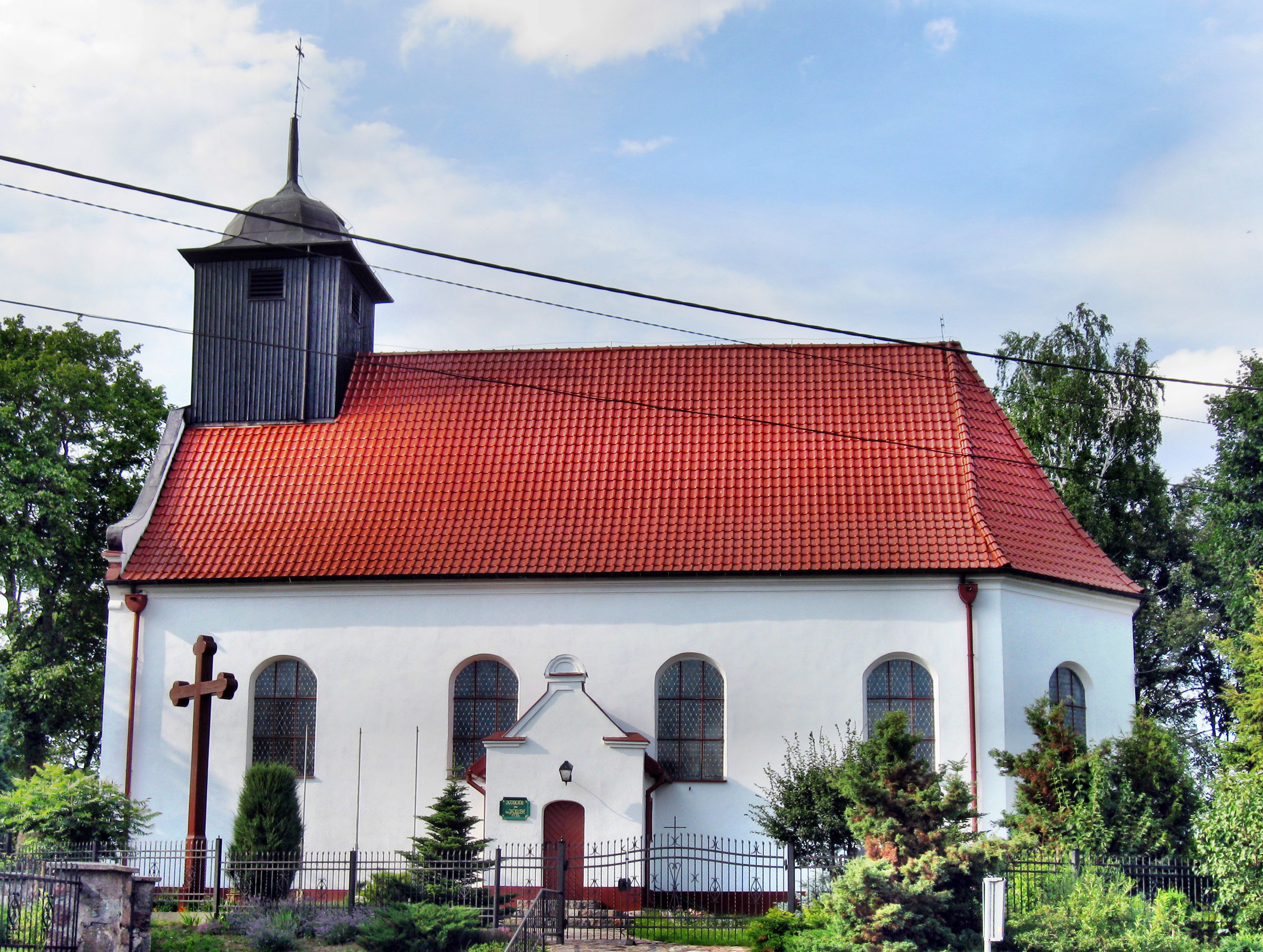
- Saint James church in Kłodawa

- Location within Poland
- Coordinates: 54°11′48″N 18°34′59″E
- Country: Poland
- Voivodeship: Pomeranian
- County: Gdańsk
- Gmina: Trąbki Wielkie

Population
  - Total: 426
- Time zone: UTC+1 (CET)
  - Summer (DST): UTC+2 (CEST)
- Website: http://www.spklodawa.republika.pl

Kłodawa [kwɔˈdava] is a village in the administrative district of Gmina Trąbki Wielkie, within Gdańsk County, Pomeranian Voivodeship, in northern Poland. It is located in the historic region of Pomerania.
