= Graniczna Wieś =

- Village
- Location within Poland
- Coordinates: 54°9′39″N 18°27′12″E
- Country: Poland
- Voivodeship: Pomeranian
- County: Gdańsk
- Gmina: Trąbki Wielkie
- Population: 252
- Time zone: UTC+1 (CET)
  - Summer (DST): UTC+2 (CEST)
- Vehicle registration: GDA

Graniczna Wieś [ɡraˈnit͡ʂna ˈvjɛɕ] is a village in the administrative district of Gmina Trąbki Wielkie, within Gdańsk County, Pomeranian Voivodeship, in northern Poland.

The name of the village means "boundary village".

During the Second World War, in 1939–1941, Graniczna Wieś was the site of the Grenzdorf subcamp of the Stutthof concentration camp, in which the Germans subjected hundreds of people to forced labour. Many Poles from Gdańsk died in the subcamp.
