= Czerniec, Pomeranian Voivodeship =

Czerniec
- Village
- Location within Poland
- Coordinates: 54°10′36″N 18°28′53″E
- Country: Poland
- Voivodeship: Pomeranian
- County: Gdańsk
- Gmina: Trąbki Wielkie
- Population: 146

Czerniec [ˈt͡ʂɛrɲɛt͡s] is a village in the administrative district of Gmina Trąbki Wielkie, within Gdańsk County, Pomeranian Voivodeship, in northern Poland.

For details of the history of the region, see History of Pomerania.
