= Ptaszniki, Gdańsk County =

Ptaszniki
- Settlement
- Location within Poland
- Coordinates: 54°8′59″N 18°49′1″E
- Country: Poland
- Voivodeship: Pomeranian
- County: Gdańsk
- Gmina: Suchy Dąb

Ptaszniki [ptaʂˈniki] is a settlement in the administrative district of Gmina Suchy Dąb, within Gdańsk County, Pomeranian Voivodeship, in northern Poland.

For details of the history of the region, see History of Pomerania.
