= Osice, Poland =

Osice
- Village
- Location within Poland
- Coordinates: 54°12′57″N 18°48′27″E
- Country: Poland
- Voivodeship: Pomeranian
- County: Gdańsk
- Gmina: Suchy Dąb
- Population: 319

Osice [ɔˈɕit͡sɛ] is a village in the administrative district of Gmina Suchy Dąb, within Gdańsk County, Pomeranian Voivodeship, in northern Poland.

For details of the history of the region, see History of Pomerania.
