= Pruska Karczma =

- Settlement
- Location within Poland
- Coordinates: 54°8′56″N 18°25′13″E
- Country: Poland
- Voivodeship: Pomeranian
- County: Gdańsk
- Gmina: Trąbki Wielkie

Pruska Karczma [ˈpruska ˈkart͡ʂma] is a settlement in the administrative district of Gmina Trąbki Wielkie, within Gdańsk County, Pomeranian Voivodeship, in northern Poland.

For details of the history of the region, see History of Pomerania.
