= Ostrowite, Gdańsk County =

Ostrowite
- Village
- Location within Poland
- Coordinates: 54°11′47″N 18°43′35″E
- Country: Poland
- Voivodeship: Pomeranian
- County: Gdańsk
- Gmina: Suchy Dąb
- Population: 105

Ostrowite [ɔstrɔˈvitɛ] (former German name: Osterwick) is a village in the administrative district of Gmina Suchy Dąb, within Gdańsk County, Pomeranian Voivodeship, in northern Poland.

For details of the history of the region, see History of Pomerania.
