= Kaczki =

Village in Kociewie

- Village
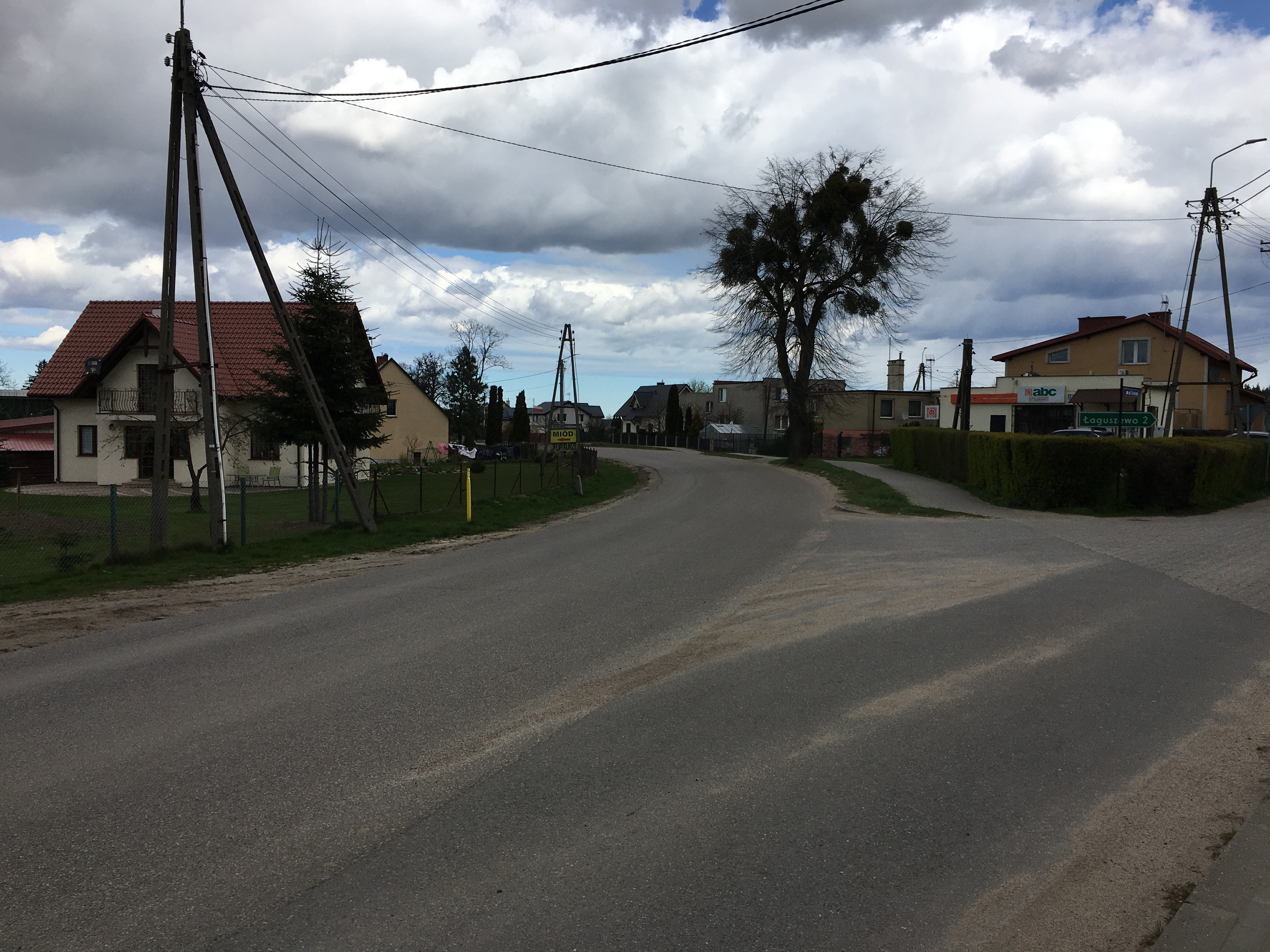

- Location within Poland
- Coordinates: 54°10′19″N 18°33′49″E
- Country: Poland
- Voivodeship: Pomeranian
- County: Gdańsk
- Gmina: Trąbki Wielkie
- Population: 254

Kaczki [ˈkat͡ʂki]is a village in the administrative district of Gmina Trąbki Wielkie, within Gdańsk County, Pomeranian Voivodeship, in northern Poland.

For details of the history of the region, see History of Pomerania.

== People ==
- Heinrich Czolbe (1819–1873), German physician
