= Koźliny, Pomeranian Voivodeship =

Koźliny
- Village
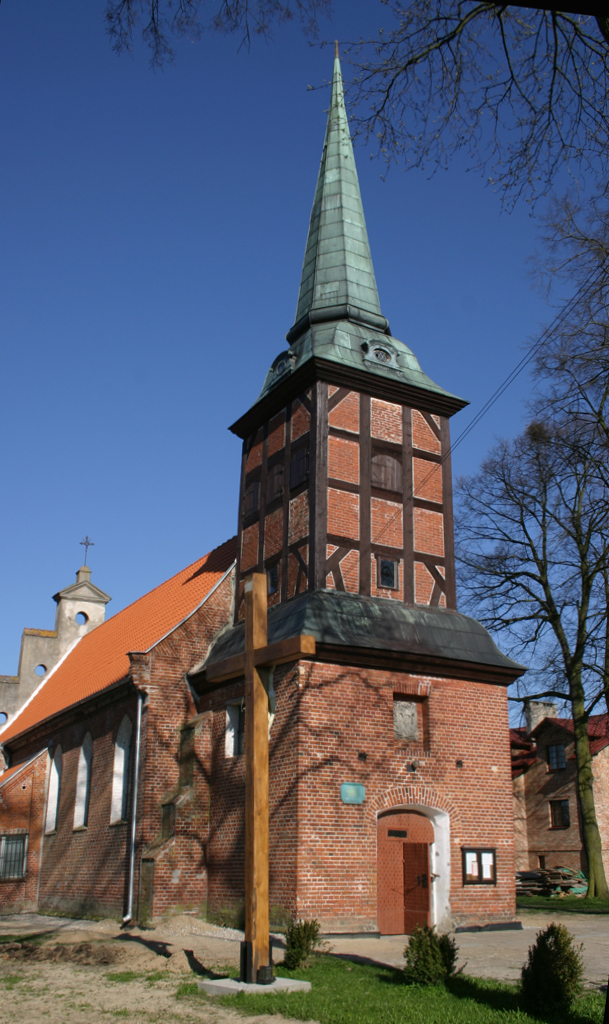
- Church of Our Lady of Rosary

- Location within Poland
- Coordinates: 54°9′33″N 18°48′13″E
- Country: Poland
- Voivodeship: Pomeranian
- County: Gdańsk
- Gmina: Suchy Dąb
- Population: 801

Koźliny [kɔˈʑlinɨ] is a village in the administrative district of Gmina Suchy Dąb, within Gdańsk County, Pomeranian Voivodeship, in northern Poland.

For details of the history of the region, see History of Pomerania.

== Notable residents ==
- Max Halbe (1865–1944), German dramatist
