= Krzywe Koło =

- Village
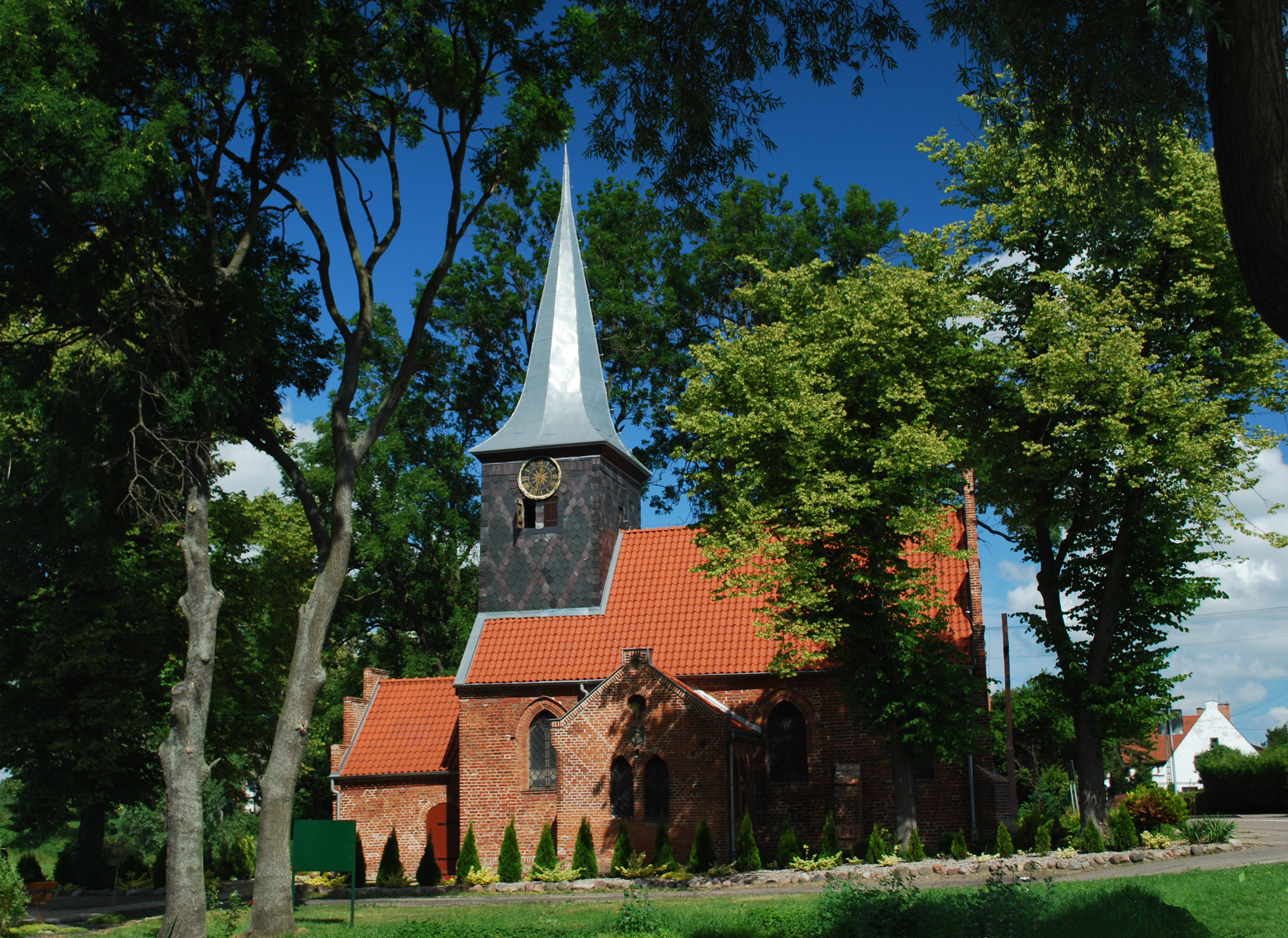
- Church of the Invention of the Holy Cross

- Location within Poland
- Coordinates: 54°10′58″N 18°46′40″E
- Country: Poland
- Voivodeship: Pomeranian
- County: Gdańsk
- Gmina: Suchy Dąb
- Elevation: 30 m (98 ft)
- Population: 520

Krzywe Koło [ˈkʂɨvɛ ˈkɔwɔ] is a village in the administrative district of Gmina Suchy Dąb, within Gdańsk County, Pomeranian Voivodeship, in northern Poland.

For details of the history of the region, see History of Pomerania.
