= Grabowe Pole =

- Village
- Location within Poland
- Coordinates: 54°13′25″N 18°45′28″E
- Country: Poland
- Voivodeship: Pomeranian
- County: Gdańsk
- Gmina: Suchy Dąb
- Population: 220

Grabowe Pole [ɡraˈbɔvɛ ˈpɔlɛ] is a village in the administrative district of Gmina Suchy Dąb, within Gdańsk County, Pomeranian Voivodeship, in northern Poland.

== See also ==
- History of Pomerania, for details of the history of the region.
