= Grabina-Duchowne =

- Village
- Location within Poland
- Coordinates: 54°14′49″N 18°43′19″E
- Country: Poland
- Voivodeship: Pomeranian
- County: Gdańsk
- Gmina: Suchy Dąb

Grabina-Duchowne [ɡraˈbina duˈxɔvnɛ] is a village in the administrative district of Gmina Suchy Dąb, within Gdańsk County, Pomeranian Voivodeship, in northern Poland.

For details of the history of the region, see History of Pomerania.
