= Wróblewo, Pomeranian Voivodeship =

Wróblewo
- Village
- Location within Poland
- Coordinates: 54°15′24″N 18°44′54″E
- Country: Poland
- Voivodeship: Pomeranian
- County: Gdańsk
- Gmina: Suchy Dąb
- Population: 132

Wróblewo [vruˈblɛvɔ] is a village in the administrative district of Gmina Suchy Dąb, within Gdańsk County, Pomeranian Voivodeship, in northern Poland.

For details of the history of the region, see History of Pomerania.
