= Ełganówko =

Village in Kociewie

- Settlement
- Location within Poland
- Coordinates: 54°8′48″N 18°30′4″E
- Country: Poland
- Voivodeship: Pomeranian
- County: Gdańsk
- Gmina: Trąbki Wielkie

Ełganówko [ɛu̯ɡaˈnufkɔ] is a settlement in the administrative district of Gmina Trąbki Wielkie, within Gdańsk County, Pomeranian Voivodeship, in northern Poland.

For details of the history of the region, see History of Pomerania.
