= Gołębiewko, Pomeranian Voivodeship =

Village in Kociewie

Gołębiewko
- Village
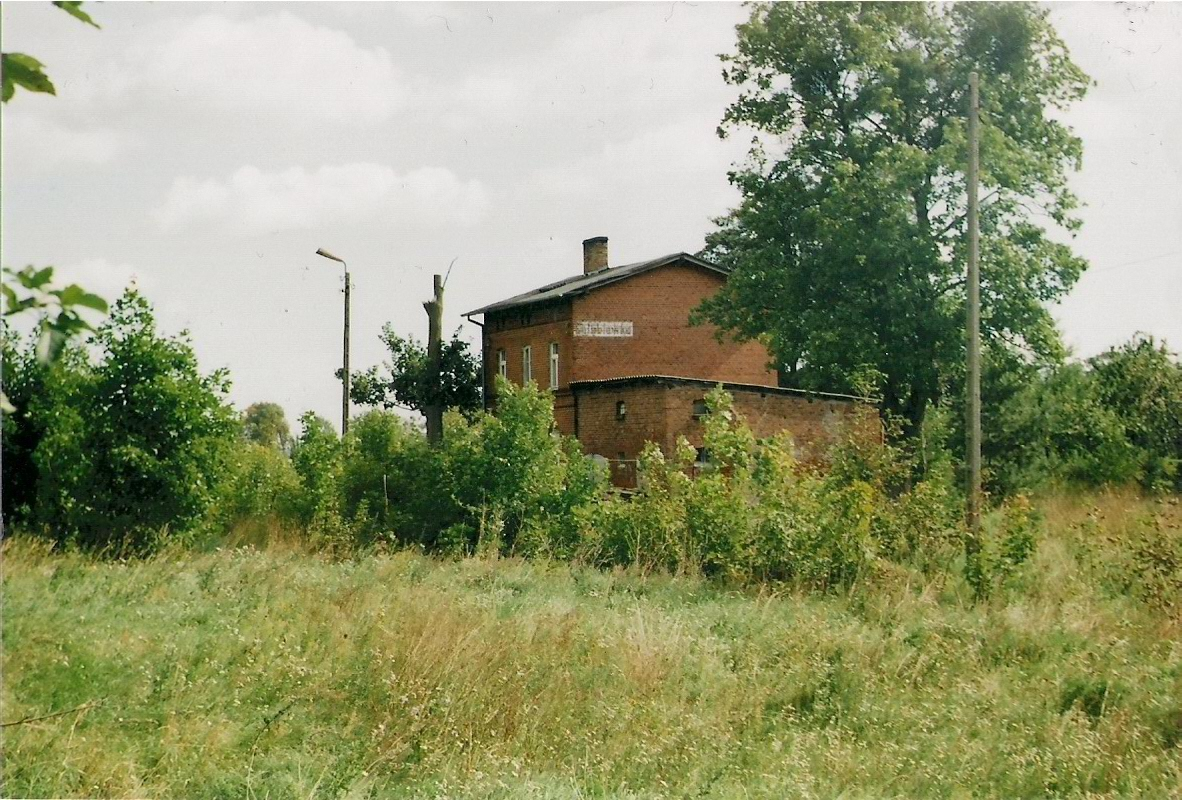
- The former railway station building in Gołębiewko

- Location within Poland
- Coordinates: 54°7′16″N 18°32′32″E
- Country: Poland
- Voivodeship: Pomeranian
- County: Gdańsk
- Gmina: Trąbki Wielkie
- Population: 341

Gołębiewko [ɡɔwɛmˈbjɛfkɔ] is a village in the administrative district of Gmina Trąbki Wielkie, within Gdańsk County, Pomeranian Voivodeship, in northern Poland.

For details of the history of the region, see History of Pomerania.
