= Gmina Suchy Dąb =

Gmina Suchy Dąb Suchy Dąb Commune
- Gmina
- Coat of arms
- Interactive map of Gmina Suchy Dąb
- Coordinates (Suchy Dąb): 54°12′24″N 18°46′3″E
- Country: Poland
- Voivodeship: Pomeranian
- County: Gdańsk
- Seat: Suchy Dąb

Area
  - Total: 84.98 km^{2} (32.81 sq mi)

Population (2006)
  - Total: 3,832
  - Density: 45.09/km^{2} (116.8/sq mi)
- Website: http://www.suchy-dab.pl

Gmina Suchy Dąb is a rural gmina (administrative district) in Gdańsk County, Pomeranian Voivodeship, in northern Poland. Its seat is the village of Suchy Dąb, which lies approximately 11 kilometres (7 mi) south-east of Pruszcz Gdański and 20 km (12 mi) south-east of the regional capital Gdańsk.

The gmina covers an area of 84.98 square kilometres (32.8 sq mi), and as of 2006 its total population is 3,832.

== Villages ==
Gmina Suchy Dąb contains the villages and settlements of Grabina-Duchowne, Grabiny-Zameczek, Grabowe Pole, Grabowo, Koźliny, Krzywe Koło, Krzywe Koło-Kolonia, Osice, Ostrowite, Ptaszniki, Steblewo, Suchy Dąb and Wróblewo.

== Neighbouring gminas ==
Gmina Suchy Dąb is bordered by the gminas of Cedry Wielkie, Lichnowy, Ostaszewo, Pruszcz Gdański, Pszczółki and Tczew.
