= Heinrich Czolbe =

German physician and materialist philosopher (1819–1873)

Heinrich Adam Friedrich Czolbe (30 December 1819, Katzke bei Danzig (now, a village of Kaczki; pl) - 19 February 1873, Königsberg) was a medical doctor and materialist philosopher from the Kingdom of Prussia.

== Literary works ==
- Neue Darstellung des Sensualismus, 1855
- Entstehung des Selbstbewußtseins. Eine Antwort an Herrn Professor Lotze, Leipzig 1856 (PDF)
- Die Grenzen und der Ursprung des menschlichen Erkentniss, 1865
