= Symbols of Gdańsk County =

Coat of arms of Gdańsk County
- Adopted: 24 November 1999
- Use: Gdańsk County

Gdańsk County
- Use: Gdańsk County
- Proportion: 5:8
- Adopted: 31 June 2001

The coat of arms that serve as the symbols of the Gdańsk County, Pomeranian Voivodeship, in northern Poland was established in 1999, and the flag, in 2001.

== Design ==
The coat of arms of the Gdańsk County, Pomeranian Voivodeship, in Poland, is divided vertically into two fields, red on the left, and white on the right. The red field contains a yellow (golden) lion standing on its back legs, facing right. The white field contains a black cog ship facing left, with a red sail with two vertically placed white crosses hummetty and a golden crown above them. The symbol was based on the coat of arms of the city of Gdańsk.

The flag of the county is vertically divided into two equal stripes, white on the left, and red on the right. In the middle is placed the coat of arms of the county. The flag proportions have the aspect ratio of its height to its wight equal 5:8.

== History ==
The coat of arms of the Gdańsk County was established by the county council on 24 November 1999. The flag of the county was established on 31 June 2001.

== See also ==
- Coat of arms of Gdańsk
- Flag of Gdańsk
