= Popieluszko (disambiguation) =

Jerzy Popiełuszko (1947–1984) was a Polish Roman Catholic priest.

Popieluszko may also refer to:

- Marianna Popiełuszko (1920–2013), Polish farmer and the mother of Jerzy Popiełuszko

== Media ==
- Popieluszko: Freedom Is Within Us, a 2009 Polish biographical drama film.

== See also ==
- Parish of Blessed Jerzy Popiełuszko
