= Max Halbe =

German dramatist (1865–1944)

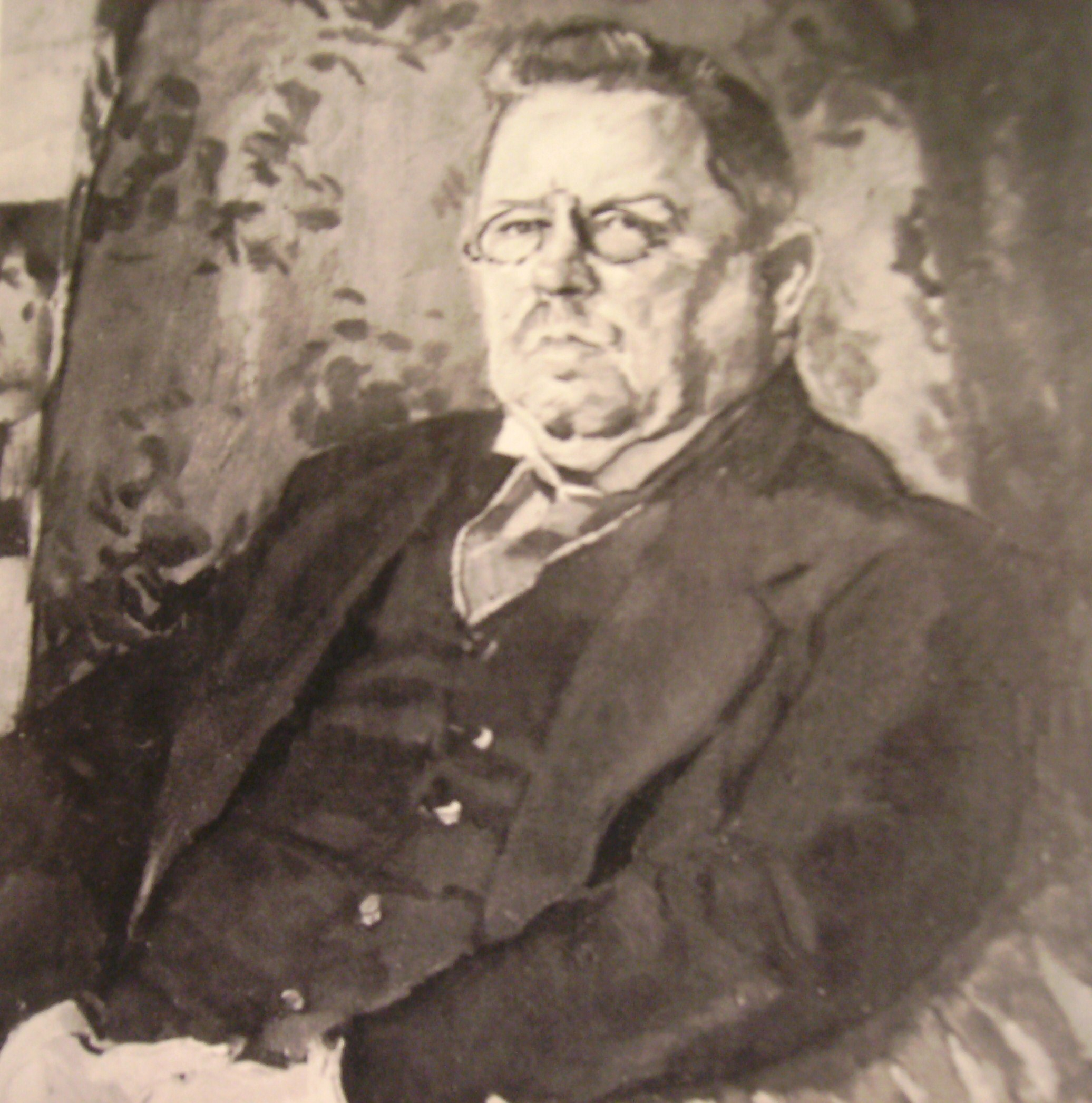
- Portrait by Albert Weisgerber, 1909
- Born: 4 October 1865; Güttland (Koźliny) near Danzig (Gdańsk), Kingdom of Prussia
- Died: 30 November 1944 (aged 79); Neuötting, Bavaria, Nazi Germany

Max Halbe (4 October 1865 – 30 November 1944) was a German dramatist and main exponent of Naturalism.

== Biography ==
Halbe was born at the manor of Güttland (Koźliny) near Danzig (Gdańsk), where he grew up. He was a member of an old family of peasants who had immigrated two centuries earlier from Westphalia. He attended the gymnasium (secondary school) at Marienburg. In 1883, he began his study of law at Heidelberg University. He studied history and Germanic philology at the Friedrich Wilhelm University of Berlin from 1885 to 1887. He obtained his doctorate at the Ludwig-Maximilians-Universität München in 1888.

He then moved to Berlin. In both Berlin and Munich, Halbe became acquainted with the leaders of the new naturalistic movement in German literature, and became associated with the Free Stage (German: Freie Bühne) movement in 1889. He was strongly influenced by the association with, and the works of, Johannes Schlaf and Arno Holt. In the spring of 1890, he wrote the play Free Love (German: Freie Liebe), later called Ein Verhältnis (1895). He married the same year. Halbe was not entirely in accord with the Freie Bühne, and with consistent naturalism (see Gerhart Hauptmann), as the latter deviated considerably from his own tendencies.

He published Eisgang in 1892, and then his primary work, Jugend (Youth), in 1893, which was, after Hauptmann's Die Weber, the most successful contemporary stage play in Germany. It was difficult for him to get Eisgang and Jugend performed, although Jugend got a performance on the Freie Volksbühne in 1892. Jugend was especially difficult to place: famous theatre managers in Berlin (L'Arronge, Barnay, Blumenthal) refused it, but Lautenburg accepted and performed it with great success in 1893. The drama, whose unaffected and sympathetic treatment of sexual relationships made no concessions to prevailing bourgeois morality, won it the enthusiastic praise of socialist critics. Franz Mehring, the principal spokesman of the Social Democratic Party of Germany on culture, warmly welcomed Jugend and referred to Halbe, along with Gerhardt Hauptmann, as "one of the princes of Genius land." In 1917 an operatic version of Jugend, composed by Ignatz Waghalter, was premiered in Berlin at the Deutsches Opernhaus (now known as the Deutsche Oper) to great acclaim.

Halbe's next play, the comedy The Tourist in America (German: Der Amerikafahrer) made the impression of being witless, and his reputation rapidly declined. Constant laments were uttered by critics as to his failure to fulfill the promise of his early work. Halbe decided to move to the rural atmosphere of Kreuzlingen, on Lake Constance, in 1894.

In 1895, Halbe went to Munich again, where, with Josef Ruederer, he founded the Intimate Theater for Dramatic Experiments (German: Intime Theater für dramatische Experimente), in which writers and poets appeared on the stage, and was a co-founder of Munich Popular Theatre (German: Münchner Volksbühne). As a member of the Munich artist society, his circle included Otto Erich Hartleben, Frank Wedekind, Hanns von Gumppenberg, Ludwig Thoma and Eduard von Keyserling.

He began writing again. The dramas Lebenswende and Mutter Erde (the latter standing with Jugend as his most famous work; a translation into English, Mother Earth, appeared in German Classics, Vol. XX, New York, 1914) and the novelle Frau Mesek are of this period.

When the National Socialists seized power in January 1933, Halbe, like Gerhart Hauptmann, did not openly speak against them, and held aloof from politics. But on 22 October 1933, he signed a statement of loyalty to Adolf Hitler. As one of the few writers of significance that remained in Germany, the Nazis used him for advertising, which after the war damaged his reputation, and led to widespread rejection of his work.

In 1933 and 1935, his biography Scholle und Schicksal and Jahrhundertwende were published. Halbe died in the age of 79 at his manor house in Neuötting, Bavaria.

== Works ==
- Ein Emporkömmling (1889)
- Freie Liebe, drama (1890)
- Der Eisgang, drama (1892)
- Jugend, drama (1893)
- Der Amerikafahrer, comedy (1894)
- Lebenswende (1896)
- Mutter Erde, drama (1897)
- Der Eroberer (1898)
- Die Heimatlosen (1899)
- Das Tausendjährige Reich, drama (1899)
- Haus Rosenhagen, drama (1901)
- Walpurgistag (1902)
- Der Strom, drama (1904)
- Die Insel der Seligen (1905)
- Das wahre Gesicht (1907)
- Blaue Berge, comedy (1909)
- Der Ring des Gauklers, play (1911)
- Die Tat des Dietrich Stobäus, novel (1911)
- Freiheit. Ein Schauspiel von 1812 (1913)
- Schloß Zeitvorbei, dramatic legend (1917)
- Die Traumgesichte des Adam Thor, play (1929)
- Generalkonsul Stenzel und sein gefährliches Ich, novel (1931)
- Heinrich von Plauen, drama (1933)
- Scholle und Schicksal. Geschichte meines Lebens, autobiography (1933)
- Jahrhundertwende. Geschichte meines Lebens 1893-1914, autobiography (1935)
- Erntefest (1936)
- Die Elixiere des Glücks, novel (1936)
- Kaiser Friedrich II (1940)
- Jo, novel (1917)
