= Suchy Dąb =

- Village
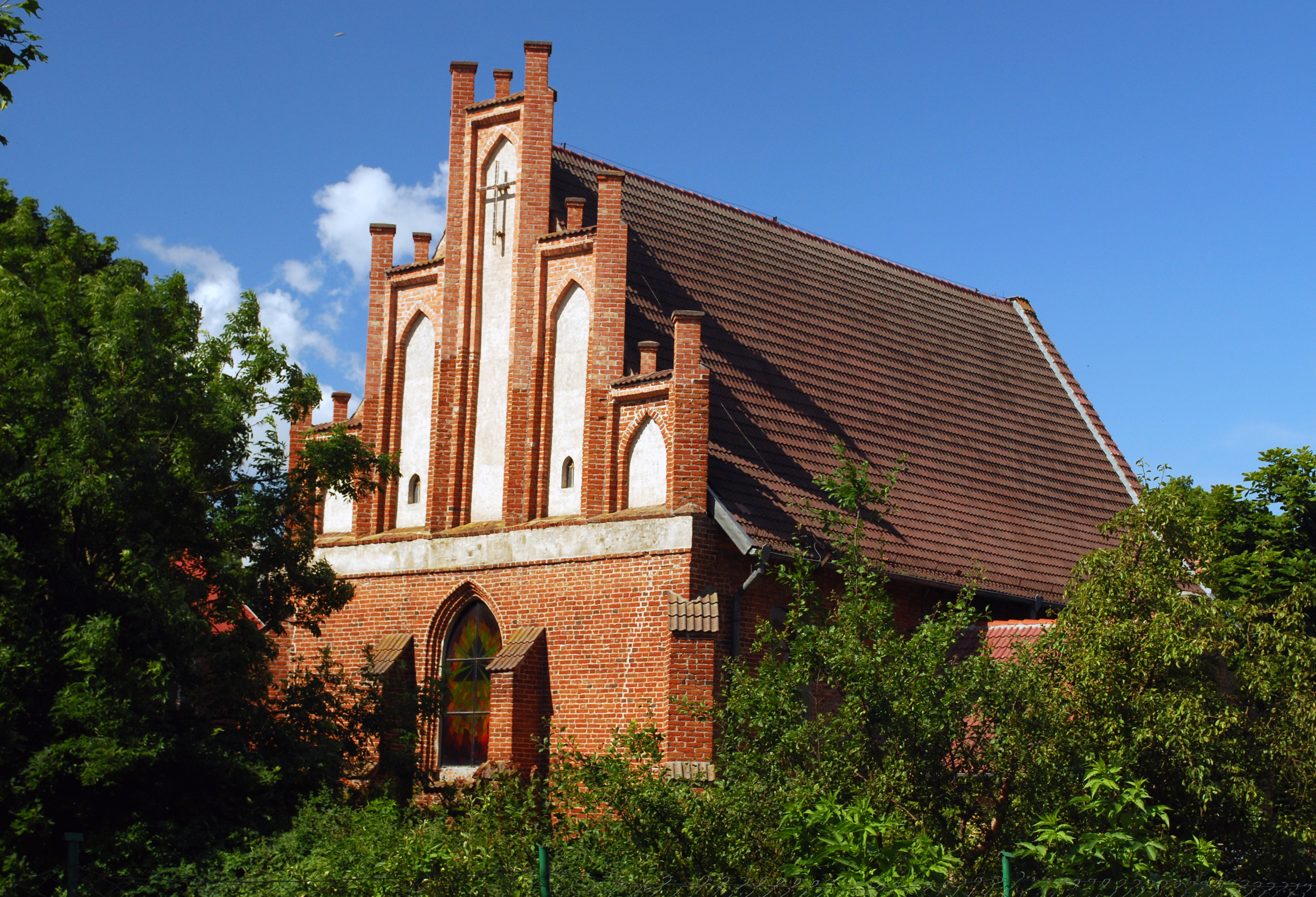
- Church of Saint Anne

- Location within Poland
- Coordinates: 54°12′24″N 18°46′3″E
- Country: Poland
- Voivodeship: Pomeranian
- County: Gdańsk
- Gmina: Suchy Dąb
- Population: 1,110

Suchy Dąb [ˈsuxɨ ˈdɔmp] (German: Zugdam) is a village in Gdańsk County, Pomeranian Voivodeship, in northern Poland. It is the seat of the gmina (administrative district) called Gmina Suchy Dąb.
