= Sobowidz =

Village in Kociewie

- Village
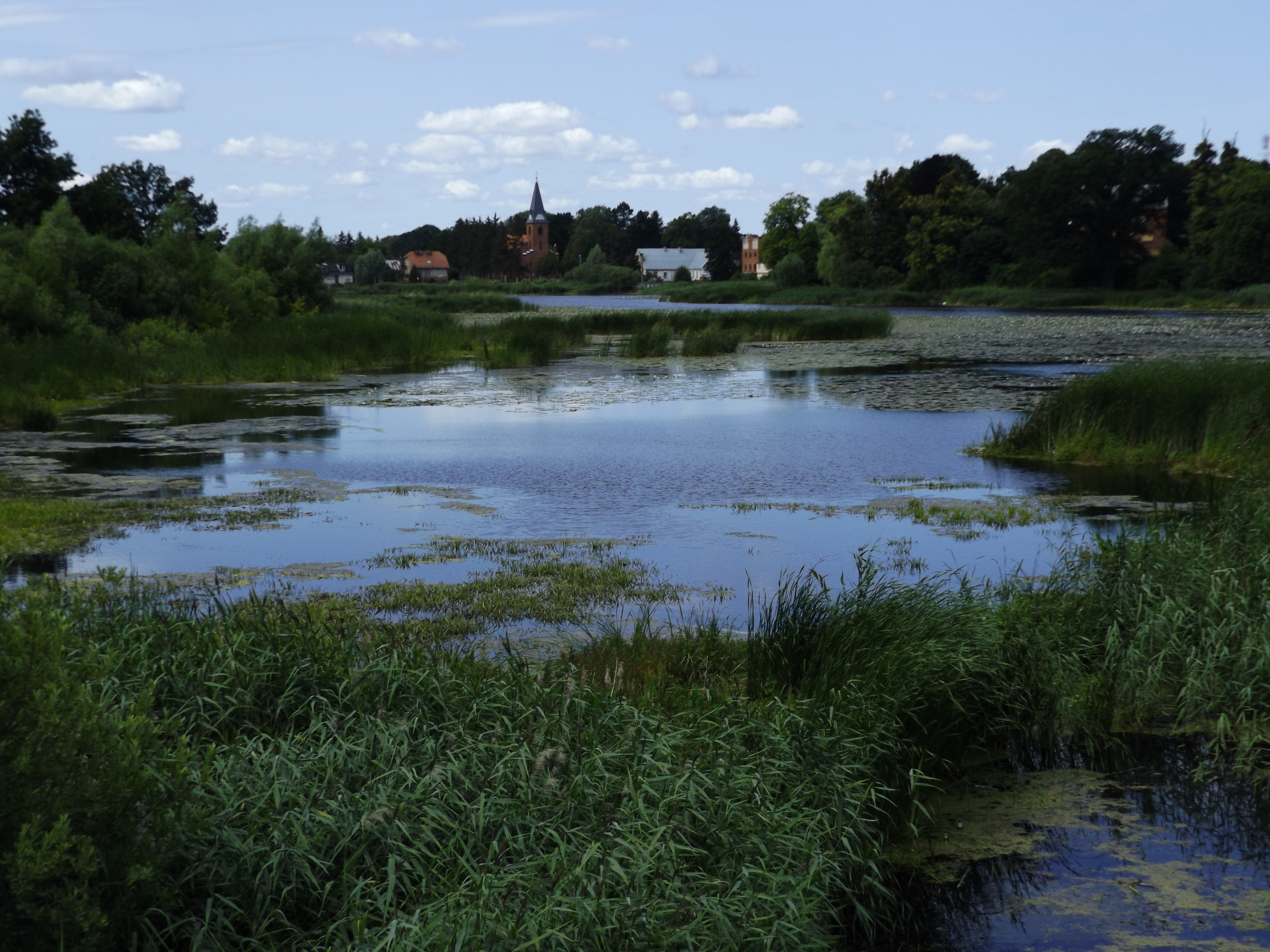
- View of Sobowidz from the Sobowidz Lake

- Location within Poland
- Coordinates: 54°8′35″N 18°36′35″E
- Country: Poland
- Voivodeship: Pomeranian
- County: Gdańsk
- Gmina: Trąbki Wielkie
- Population: 1,535
- Time zone: UTC+1 (CET)
  - Summer (DST): UTC+2 (CEST)

Sobowidz [sɔˈbɔvit͡s] is a village in the administrative district of Gmina Trąbki Wielkie, within Gdańsk County, Pomeranian Voivodeship, in northern Poland. It is located within the ethnocultural region of Kociewie in the historic region of Pomerania.

Sobowidz was a royal village of the Polish Crown, administratively located in the Tczew County in the Pomeranian Voivodeship.
