= Trąbki Wielkie =

Village in Kociewie

- Village
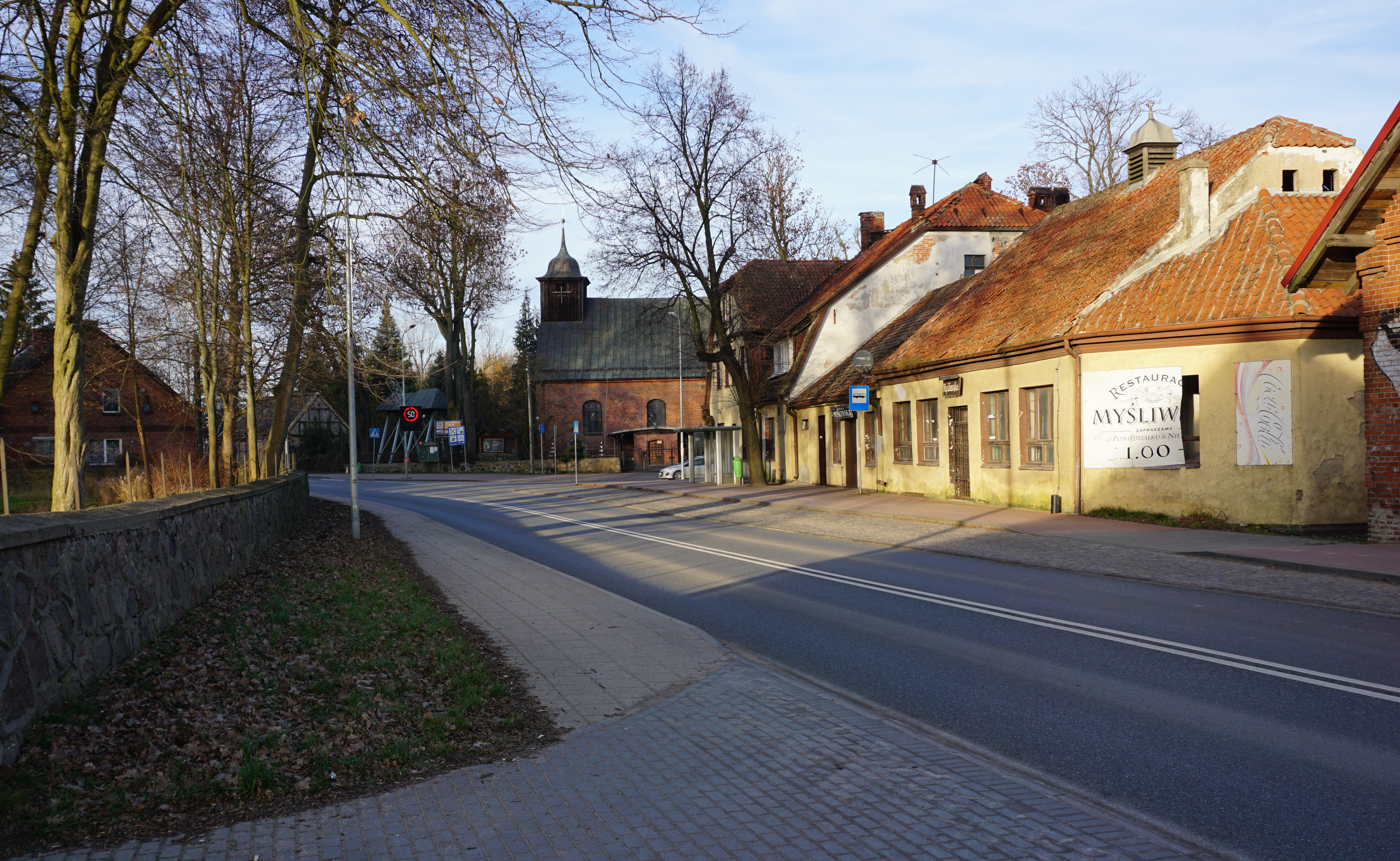
- The village centre

- Location within Poland
- Coordinates: 54°10′11″N 18°32′23″E
- Country: Poland
- Voivodeship: Pomeranian
- County: Gdańsk
- Gmina: Trąbki Wielkie

Population
  - Total: 1,240
- Time zone: UTC+1 (CET)
  - Summer (DST): UTC+2 (CEST)
- Website: http://www.trabkiw.ug.gov.pl/

Trąbki Wielkie [ˈtrɔmpki ˈvjɛlkʲɛ] is a village in Gdańsk County, Pomeranian Voivodeship, in northern Poland. It is the seat of the gmina (administrative district) called Gmina Trąbki Wielkie. It is located within the historic region of Pomerania.

Trąbki Wielkie was a royal village of the Polish Crown, administratively located in the Tczew County in the Pomeranian Voivodeship.
