= Gmina Trąbki Wielkie =

Gmina Trąbki Wielkie Trąbki Wielkie Commune
- Gmina
- Flag Coat of arms
- Interactive map of Gmina Trąbki Wielkie
- Coordinates (Trąbki Wielkie): 54°10′11″N 18°32′23″E
- Country: Poland
- Voivodeship: Pomeranian
- County: Gdańsk
- Seat: Trąbki Wielkie

Area
  - Total: 162.62 km^{2} (62.79 sq mi)

Population (2006)
  - Total: 9,495
  - Density: 58.39/km^{2} (151.2/sq mi)
- Website: https://www.trabkiw.ug.gov.pl

Gmina Trąbki Wielkie is a rural borough (administrative district) in Gdańsk County, Pomeranian Voivodeship, in northern Poland. Its seat is the village of Trąbki Wielkie, which lies approximately 13 kilometres (8 mi) south-west of Pruszcz Gdański and 23 km (14 mi) south of the regional capital Gdańsk.

The borough covers an area of 162.62 square kilometres (62.8 sq mi). In 2006 its total population was 9,495, at the end of 2010 – 10.221, in year 2011 – 10.484 and in year 2015 - 10.688.

== Villages ==
Gmina Trąbki Wielkie contains the villages and settlements of Błotnia, Celmerostwo, Cząstkowo, Czerniec, Czerniewko, Czerniewo, Domachowo, Drzewina, Ełganówko, Ełganowo, Glinna Góra, Gołębiewko, Gołębiewo, Gołębiewo Średnie, Graniczna Wieś, Kaczki, Klępiny, Kleszczewo, Kłodawa, Klowiter, Kobierzyn, Łaguszewo, Mierzeszyn, Pawłowo, Postołowo, Pruska Karczma, Rościszewko, Rościszewo, Sobowidz, Trąbki Małe, Trąbki Wielkie, Warcz, Wojanowo, Wymysłowo, Zaskoczyn, Zielenina and Zła Wieś.

== Neighbouring gminas ==
Gmina Trąbki Wielkie is bordered by the boroughs of Kolbudy, Pruszcz Gdański, Przywidz, Pszczółki, Skarszewy and Tczew.
