= Gdańsk County =

Gdańsk County Powiat gdański
- County
- Flag Coat of arms

- Coordinates (Pruszcz Gdański): 54°16′N 18°38′E
- Country: Poland
- Voivodeship: Pomeranian
- Seat: Pruszcz Gdański
- Gminas: Total 8 (incl. 1 urban): Pruszcz Gdański; Gmina Cedry Wielkie; Gmina Kolbudy; Gmina Pruszcz Gdański; Gmina Przywidz; Gmina Pszczółki; Gmina Suchy Dąb; Gmina Trąbki Wielkie

Area
  - Total: 793.17 km^{2} (306.24 sq mi)

Population (2019)
  - Total: 117,452
  - Density: 148.08/km^{2} (383.52/sq mi)
  - Urban: 31,135
  - Rural: 86,317
- Car plates: GDA
- Website: www.powiat-gdanski.pl

Gdańsk County (Polish: powiat gdański) is a unit of territorial administration and local government (powiat) in Pomeranian Voivodeship, northern Poland. It came into being on January 1, 1999, as a result of the Polish local government reforms passed in 1998. It includes areas to the east and south of the city of Gdańsk, from which the county takes its name, although the city is not part of its territory. The county seat and only town in Gdańsk County is Pruszcz Gdański, which lies 12 kilometres (7 mi) south of central Gdańsk.

The county covers an area of 793.17 square kilometres (306.2 sq mi). As of 2019 its total population is 117,452, out of which the population of Pruszcz Gdański is 31,135and the rural population is 86,317.

Gdańsk County on a map of the counties of Pomeranian Voivodeship

Gdańsk County is bordered by the city of Gdańsk to the north, Nowy Dwór County to the east, Malbork County to the south-east, Tczew County and Starogard County to the south, and Kościerzyna County and Kartuzy County to the west.

== Administrative divisions ==
The county is subdivided into eight gminas (one urban and seven rural). These are listed in the following table, in descending order of population.

Gmina	Type	Area (km^{2})	Population (2019)	Seat
Pruszcz Gdański	urban	16.5	31,135	
Gmina Pruszcz Gdański	rural	142.6	30,782	Juszkowo
Gmina Kolbudy	rural	82.8	17,688	Kolbudy
Gmina Trąbki Wielkie	rural	162.6	11,098	Trąbki Wielkie
Gmina Pszczółki	rural	49.8	9,683	Pszczółki
Gmina Cedry Wielkie	rural	124.3	6,947	Cedry Wielkie
Gmina Przywidz	rural	129.6	5,904	Przywidz
Gmina Suchy Dąb	rural	85.0	4,215	Suchy Dąb
