= Kalckstein =

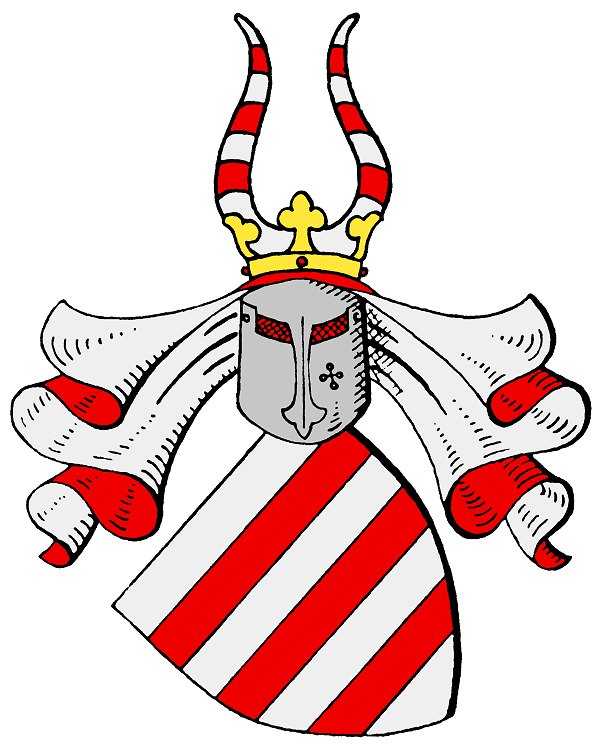
Coat of arms of the Kalckstein family

The Kalckstein family is an old Prussian noble family of Warmian origin, whose members held significant military posts in the Kingdom of Prussia and later within the German Empire.

== Notable members ==
- Albrecht von Kalckstein (1592-1667), Prussian nobleman
- Christian Ludwig von Kalckstein (1630-1672), executed Prussian nobleman
- Christoph Wilhelm von Kalckstein (1682-1759), Prussian field marshal
- Ludwig Karl von Kalckstein (1725–1800) Prussian field marshal.
- Karl Georg Otto Willibald von Kalckstein (1812-1894) German politician
