= Gvardeyskoye, Kaliningrad Oblast =

Gvardeyskoye Гварде́йское
- Rural locality
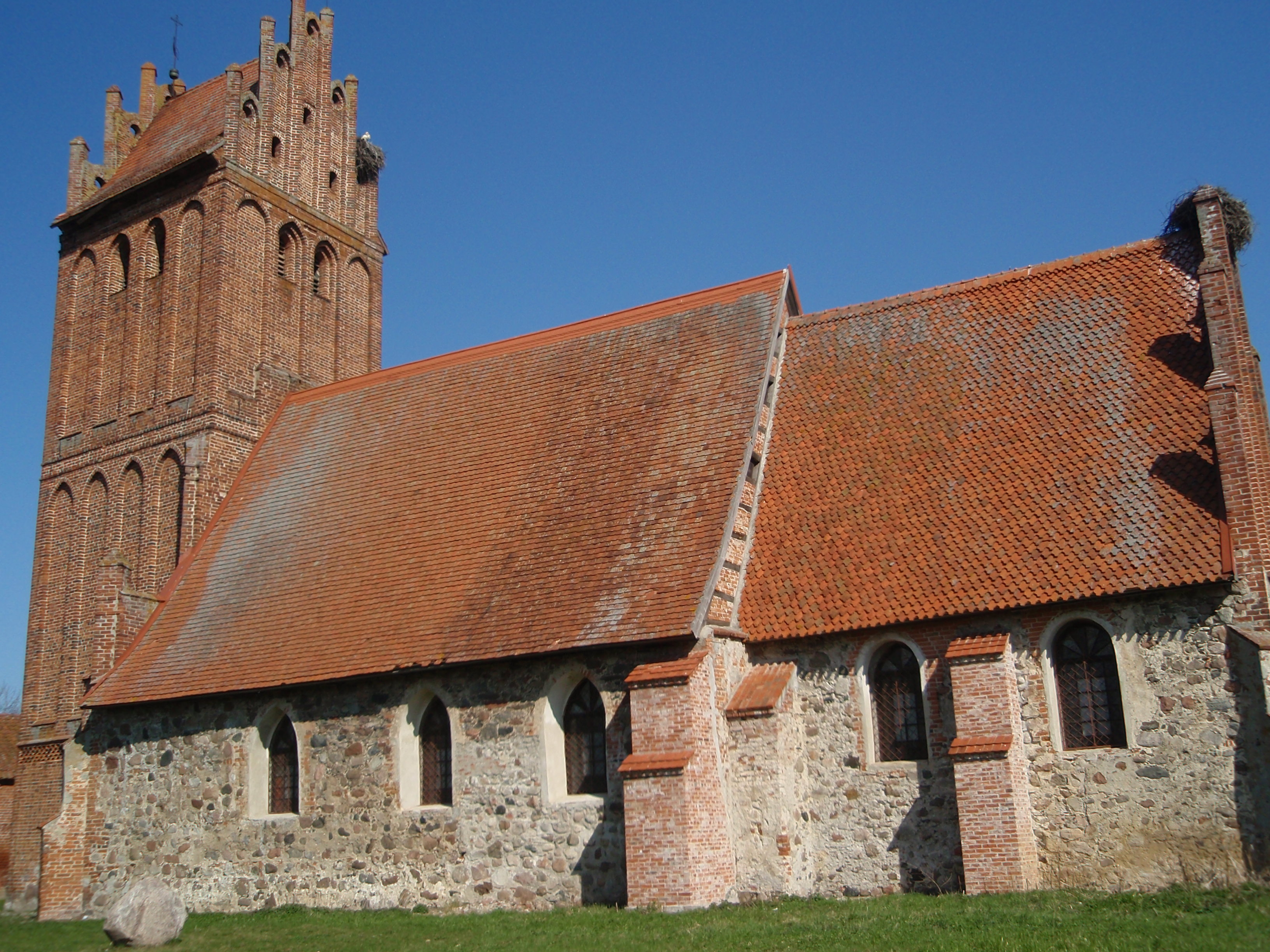
- Church
- Interactive map of Gvardeyskoye
- Location of Gvardeyskoye Gvardeyskoye (European Russia) Gvardeyskoye (Russia)
- Coordinates: 54°29′N 20°38′E
- Country: Russia
- Federal subject: Kaliningrad Oblast
- Administrative district: Bagrationovsky District
- Founded: 14th century
- Elevation: 42 m (138 ft)

Population (2010 Census)
  - Total: 564
  - Estimate (2010): 564 (0%)
- Time zone: UTC+2 (MSK–1)
- Postal codes: 238437, 238427
- OKTMO ID: 27703000126

Gvardeyskoye (Russian: Гвардейское; Lithuanian: Miulhauzenas; German: Mühlhausen (Kreis Preußisch Eylau); Polish: Młynary) is a rural locality (a settlement) in Bagrationovsky District of Kaliningrad Oblast, Russia, located approximately 10 kilometers (6.2 mi) north of Bagrationovsk, the administrative center of the district, and 25 kilometers (16 mi) south of Kaliningrad, the administrative center of the oblast.

== History ==
It was founded by the Teutonic Knights in the Old Prussian region of Natangia as a location of a mill (mühle means a mill) and a church, first mentioned in 1372. In 1454, the region was incorporated by King Casimir IV Jagiellon to the Kingdom of Poland upon the request of the anti-Teutonic Prussian Confederation. After the subsequent Thirteen Years' War, since 1466, it formed part of Poland as a fief held by the Teutonic Order, and then held by Ducal Prussia after the secularization of the Order in 1525. It was given as a pawn by the Order to Daniel von Kunheim in 1474. The laird Georg von Kunheim, a student at Wittenberg, married Martin Luther's youngest daughter Margarethe Luther in 1555; she died in Mühlhausen in 1570. Two paintings of Luther and his wife Katharina von Bora by Lucas Cranach existed at the church up to 1945, as well as the original summons of Martin Luther by Emperor Charles V to the Diet of Worms and an original letter, written by Luther.

The settlement became a part of the Kingdom of Prussia in 1701, and from 1871 it was also part of Germany. In 1643, Mühlhausen came into the property of the von Kalckstein family until 1826, also as advowson of the Church.

Conquered by the Red Army during World War II, Mühlhausen was transferred from Germany to the Soviet Union according to the 1945 Potsdam Conference and had its German population expelled, also in accordance to the Potsdam Conference. It was given its present name by the Soviets.

The formerly ruined church was rebuilt after 1994.

== Population ==
- 1820: 353
- 1846: 454
- 1871: 670
- 1895: 662
- 1930: 576
- 1939: 939 (after the incorporation of Knauten)

== Notable people ==
- Caspar Hennenberger (1529–1600), cartographer, Lutheran pastor
- Albrecht von Kalckstein (1592-1667), Prussian count
- Christian Ludwig von Kalckstein (1630–1672)
- Christoph Wilhelm von Kalckstein (1682-1759), educator of Frederick the Great
- Ludwig Karl von Kalckstein (1725-1800), Prussian count and field marshal
- Karl Georg Otto Willibald von Kalckstein (1812-1894), politician
- Johann Friedrich Schultz, German philosopher
- Khamzat Chimaev, Chechen MMA fighter

== Bibliography ==
- Horst Schulz, Der Kreis Pr. Eylau, Verden/Aller 1983
