= Conrad Letzkau =

14th-century Polish nobleman

Conrad Letzkau (Polish: Konrad Leczkow) (after 1350 – 1411) was a councilman and later Mayor of Danzig who, together with Arnold Hecht, was assassinated by the Teutonic Knights.

== Origins ==
While his exact place of birth is unknown, Conrad's family came from the area of the Żuławy Gdańskie, from the village of Letzkau (then Leszkowy, hence his surname). In 1387, Letzkau came to Danzig and soon received the city's citizenship and corresponding privileges. He engaged himself in the city's commerce, amassed substantial wealth, and, in 1393, was made a councilman of the city, although official documents list him as such only later. Because of his diplomatic skills and his judicial independence, he was elected the mayor of Danzig in 1405.

== Autonomy of Danzig ==
This marked a part of a broader movement for city's autonomy from the control of the Teutonic Knights; previously councilmen and mayors could not be appointed without the order's approval. The growing independence caused the city to come into conflict with the newly elected Grand Master of the Order Ulrich von Jungingen who tried to interfere into the commercial activities of the city. Letzkau, along with Arnold Hecht and Peter Vorrath, was one of the initiators of a letter to the Grand Master, signed by Prussian nobility and representatives of major cities in Teutonic Prussia, complaining about the Order's tax collectors and administrators who interfered with the trade in grain and other goods in the region. Von Jungingen's policies led the leaders of Danzig to believe that the city was never going to be able to achieve the kind of independence enjoyed by other Hanseatic towns, such as the Free City of Lübeck, as long as it remained under the control of the Teutonic Order. As a result, the councilmen and the local citizens began to support the claims of the Kingdom of Poland to the region. Letzkau in particular often traveled to conventions and meetings of the representatives of Hansa towns which allowed him to compare the favorable conditions abroad with those he found in his own city under the control of the Knights.

== In the Order's Service ==
Previously however, Letzkau took an active part in the Order's politics. In 1398, he led a united Teutonic-Hanseatic flotilla against Baltic Sea pirates, the Victual Brothers, attacked and took the island of Gotland. In 1404, while on an expedition against Danish corsairs, he was captured and imprisoned for two years in Varberg. In 1408, he served as a diplomat to the Danish Queen Margaret, in an embassy that sold the conquered island of Gotland to Denmark.

== The city and the Polish–Lithuanian–Teutonic War ==
The funds obtained from the sale of Gotland were used by the Knights to arm themselves in the war against Poland-Lithuania which soon broke out. A 300-person regiment from Danzig, including Letzkau, took part in the Battle of Grunwald, fighting on the side of the Knights. The komtur leading the regiment, Johann von Schönfeld, escaped from the battlefield while most of the three hundred regular soldiers, composed mostly of Danzig's burghers and ordinary citizens, were taken captive by the Poles and Lithuanians. However, the Polish king, Jogaila, aware that the Danzigers had already been dissatisfied with the Order's rule, set all of them free, hoping to secure goodwill among them for the future.

== Allegiance to Poland–Lithuania ==
The defeat of the Order, combined with previous anger at the Knights' economic policies, resulted in a gradual but definitive shift among the city council to a pro-Polish stance. The growing conflict between the Order and the city was acerbated when some of the wounded knights, returning from the war, were quartered in Danzig and other cities and soon were accused of robbing and abusing the citizens. Under Letzkau's orders, the city council took control of the town castle and garrisoned it with its own trusted men. The news that Thorn (modern-day Toruń) accepted the suzerainty of the King of Poland and in return received extensive civic privileges caused the city council to open negotiations with the Polish King to do the same for Danzig. The intermediary between the king and the council was the Bishop of Włocławek, Jan Kropidło. On 4 August, Letzkau and Kropidło participated in a conference with the Polish king after which the city swore an oath to the Polish King, Jagiello, who was declared "Protector of the City of Danzig", and on the next day, Jagiello bestowed the city with civic privileges similar to those previously granted to Thorn. On 7 August, the town welcomed Janusz from Tuliszkow as the king's representative and the first Starosta of Danzig.

== Back with the Knights ==
However, as the Polish siege of Marienburg prolonged, the interim leader of the Order Heinrich von Plauen the Elder realized that the Polish–Lithuanian king did not have the means to enforce his de jure suzerainty over the rebellious towns. As a result, the Knights besieged the main part of the city of Danzig. After the Polish army abandoned the siege of Marienburg, the Danzigers and the Knights negotiated a cease fire and began negotiations for a surrender of the town. The city council sent desperate letters to Jagiello who was however unable to help. After a stormy session, the city council finally decided to swear an oath of allegiance to von Plauen, who had now been made a Master of the order.

Despite this fact, the citizens of the city continued to resent the Order's rule which manifested itself mostly through the refusal to pay taxes or otherwise support the Knights' military efforts in the war with Poland. The city refused to provide further recruits for the Order, justifying its refusal by the fact that it had also sworn a loyalty oath to the Polish king and had not yet been released from it. However, in 1411, the first Peace of Thorn was concluded, which placed Danzig under Teutonic control and Jagiello released the city from its oath.

Soon after, a conference was held between the Grand Master von Plauen and representatives of the city, including Letzkau, Peter Vorrath, and Herman Kleinemeister. The mayors demanded that the Order stop competing with the city's merchants, allow greater autonomy to the city, stop fortifying its positions within the city, and let the council appoint its own members. Von Plauen agreed but in return demanded that a new tax be created, proceeds from which were to be used in arming the Knights for a future war with Poland which everyone expected to begin again. In turn, Letzkau and others made the payment of the tax conditional on the Order respecting all the privileges and rights that were granted to the city by the Polish king Jagiello.

== Trouble again ==
The situation became confrontational when von Plauen issued an independent appeal to the citizens of Danzig to support the Order's military, over the head of the council. In response, Letzkau and others replied by suspending the payment of the agreed upon tax, because the town had already paid for previous military adventures, and even demanded that the costs of the naval support of Marienburg that the town provided during the siege be paid back to the city by the knights. In a preliminary conference with the Grand Master, the city councilmen were abused and thrown out. Von Plauen closed down the Danzig harbor with a large iron chain and ordered that all trade from then on was to be carried out through the port of Elbing, which the Knights held in direct control. In response, the city sailed two warships out into the Baltic Sea to intercept the Knights' trade ships, the city gates were raised and fortified, and local militias patrolled the surrounding countryside engaging the Order's forces in skirmishes.

== Negotiations, setup, and murder ==
The two sides soon agreed to negotiations. On 5 April 1411, a truce was arranged. Von Plauen removed the iron chain blocking the harbor and the citizens removed fortifications from the city gate. On Palm Sunday, 6 April, the son of the Grand Master, Heinrich von Plauen the Younger, invited the mayors of the city of Danzig, Letzkau and Arnold Hecht, and two councilmen, Bartholomäus Gross (Letzkau's son-in-law) and Tiedemann Huxer to a friendly meeting at the Knight's Castle. As the Danzigers crossed the drawbridge into the castle one of them, Huxer, claimed that he had forgotten something and excused himself, promising to return. A few moments later the three others were grabbed, imprisoned and thrown into the castle's dungeons where they were subsequently tortured and interrogated. All three were then beheaded and their bodies were thrown into the castle's moat.

== Aftermath ==
The murder of Letzkau and the others was kept secret by von Plauen the Younger for as long as possible. However, after two days, Letzkau's daughter, Anna Gross, became worried and started going to the castle's gate to inquire about their fate. The guards told her that the mayors had gotten drunk, insulted the Master and then committed suicide out of shame, which Anna took as a cruel joke. On 11 April, the rest of the city council decided to send a delegation to the Grand Master, von Plauen the Elder. The delegation was initially imprisoned, but after a few days, the Grand Master ordered their release and gave them a letter promising the release of the seized mayors. At that point, von Plauen the Younger realized he could not keep their deaths a secret anymore. He ordered the bodies of the murdered men fished out of the moat and placed in a field where it was proclaimed that they were legally executed for treason. Von Plauen successfully revoked all previously granted privileges and instituted his tax. He also forced his own men onto the council who had previously opposed Letzkau in council meetings. Tiedemann Huxer, the man who turned away at the last minute, was made a mayor of the city, which has led to speculations that he was part of the conspiracy to murder the councilmen.

According to legend, when the news of the murder was revealed, Anna Gross cursed the knights and their castle saying "Let not a stone remain upon stone of this castle!" This came to pass almost half a century later, when the destruction of the Knights' castle by angry Danzigers in 1454 marked the start of the Thirteen Years' War between the Prussian Confederation and Kingdom of Poland against the Teutonic Knights. The conclusion of the war with the Second Peace of Thorn made Danzig, along with Royal Prussia part of the Polish kingdom, forty three years after Conrad Letzkau first swore an oath of loyalty to the Polish king.

== Commemoration ==
Currently, a tablet in the St. Mary's Church in Gdańsk, in front of the chapel of St. Jadwiga of Poland, commemorates Letzkau's and Hecht's death with an inscription in Latin which reads:

"Here rest the honorable men Konrad Letzkau and Arnold Hecht, proconsuls of the city of Gdańsk, who departed this world the Monday after Palm Sunday in the year of our Lord 1411"

A street in the Wrzeszcz district (New Scotland neighborhood) is named after him.

A new Carillon was built in Gdańsk (second one in the city) at the Main Town Hall in 1999 and each of its 37 bells, in addition to being engraved with the coat of arms of the city and Poland, was given a historical patron. Conrad Letzkau was made the patron of bell #33.

== See also ==
- Christian Ludwig von Kalckstein
- Lizard Union (medieval)

== Bibliography ==
- Natalia i Waldemar Borzestowscy, "Dlaczego zginął burmistrz",
