= Lizard Union =

Lizard Union (Polish: Związek Jaszczurzy) can refer to:

- Lizard Union (medieval), an organization of Prussian nobles and knights opposed to the Teutonic Knights
- Military Organization Lizard Union, a far-right Polish resistance organization during World War II
