= Prussian Diet =

Prussian Diet may refer to:

- Prussian estates (1370s–1848)
- Prussian Landtag (1848–1933)
