= Cedry Małe =

- Village
- Location within Poland
- Coordinates: 54°16′23″N 18°51′41″E
- Country: Poland
- Voivodeship: Pomeranian
- County: Gdańsk
- Gmina: Cedry Wielkie
- Population: 927

Cedry Małe [ˈt͡sɛdrɨ ˈmawɛ] is a village in the administrative district of Gmina Cedry Wielkie, within Gdańsk County, Pomeranian Voivodeship, in northern Poland.
