= Trzcinisko =

- Village
- Location within Poland
- Coordinates: 54°18′15″N 18°51′55″E
- Country: Poland
- Voivodeship: Pomeranian
- County: Gdańsk
- Gmina: Cedry Wielkie
- Population: 223

Trzcinisko [tʂt͡ɕiˈniskɔ] is a village in the administrative district of Gmina Cedry Wielkie, within Gdańsk County, Pomeranian Voivodeship, in northern Poland.

The village lies on the left bank of the Dead Vistula river, across from the Sobieszewo Island

For details of the history of the region, see History of Pomerania.
