= Miłocin, Pomeranian Voivodeship =

Miłocin
- Village
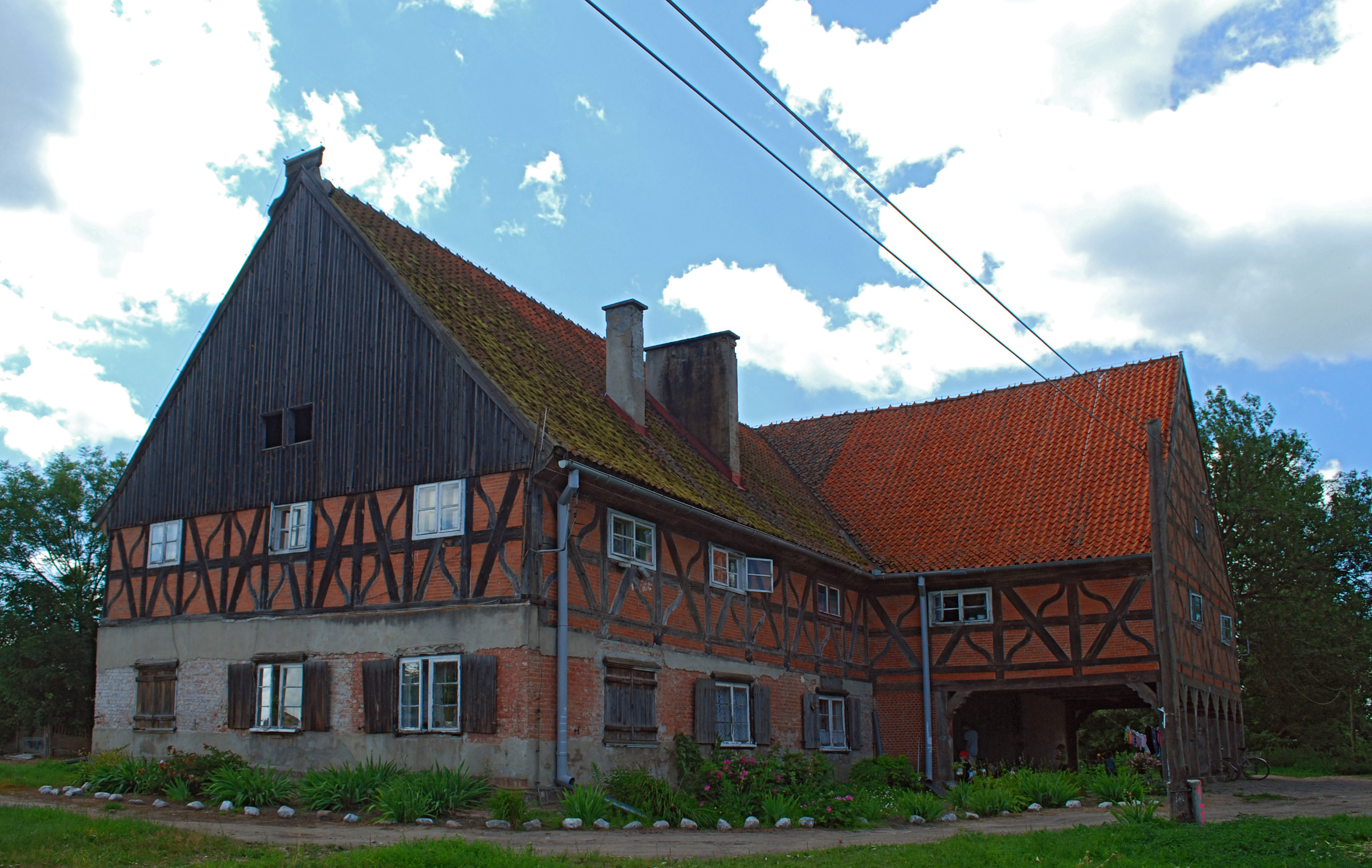

- Location within Poland
- Coordinates: 54°16′4″N 18°48′59″E
- Country: Poland
- Voivodeship: Pomeranian
- County: Gdańsk
- Gmina: Cedry Wielkie
- Population: 243

Miłocin [miˈwɔt͡ɕin] is a village in the administrative district of Gmina Cedry Wielkie, within Gdańsk County, Pomeranian Voivodeship, in northern Poland.

For details of the history of the region, see History of Pomerania.
