= Wocławy =

- Village
- Location within Poland
- Coordinates: 54°16′28″N 18°46′19″E
- Country: Poland
- Voivodeship: Pomeranian
- County: Gdańsk
- Gmina: Cedry Wielkie
- Population: 305

Wocławy [vɔt͡sˈwavɨ] is a village in the administrative district of Gmina Cedry Wielkie in Gdańsk County, Pomeranian Voivodeship, northern Poland.

For details on the region's history, see History of Pomerania.
