= Błotnik =

- Village
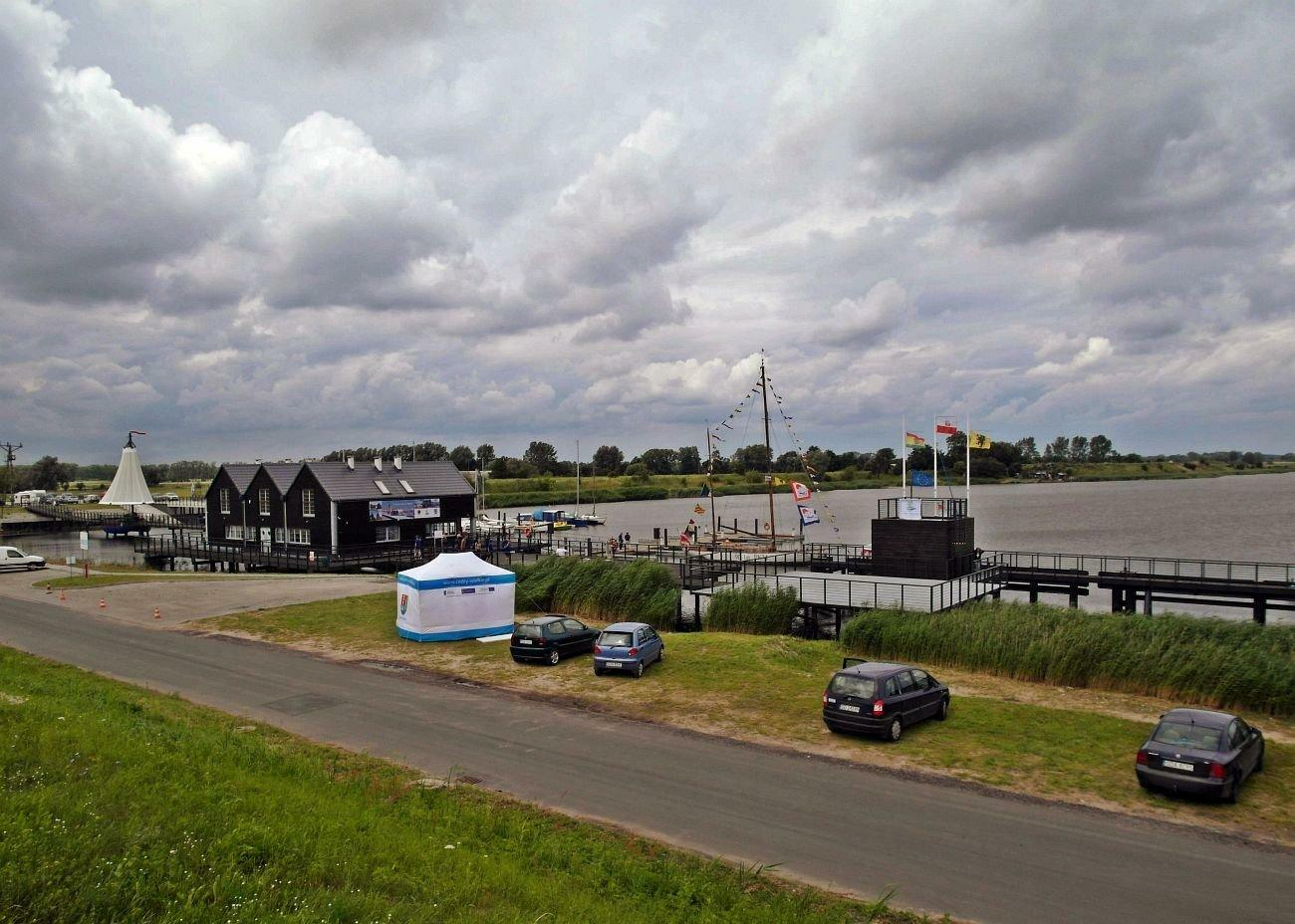

- Location within Poland
- Coordinates: 54°16′33″N 18°52′30″E
- Country: Poland
- Voivodeship: Pomeranian
- County: Gdańsk
- Gmina: Cedry Wielkie
- Population: 344

Błotnik [ˈbwɔtnik] is a village in the administrative district of Gmina Cedry Wielkie, within Gdańsk County, Pomeranian Voivodeship, in northern Poland.

== History ==
Blotnik was formerly known as Schmerblock and was part of Kreis Danzig-Niederung during the existence of the Free City of Danzig (German: Freie Stadt Danzig; Polish: Wolne Miasto Gdańsk) in the period from 1919 to 1939 and part of Nazi Germany from 1939 to 1945.
