= Gmina Cedry Wielkie =

Gmina Cedry Wielkie Cedry Wielkie Commune
- Gmina
- Flag Coat of arms
- Interactive map of Gmina Cedry Wielkie
- Coordinates (Cedry Wielkie): 54°14′39″N 18°50′44″E
- Country: Poland
- Voivodeship: Pomeranian
- County: Gdańsk
- Seat: Cedry Wielkie

Area
  - Total: 124.28 km^{2} (47.98 sq mi)

Population (2006)
  - Total: 6,156
  - Density: 49.53/km^{2} (128.3/sq mi)
- Website: http://www.cedry-wielkie.pl/index1024.html

Gmina Cedry Wielkie is a rural gmina (administrative district) in Gdańsk County, Pomeranian Voivodeship, in northern Poland. Its seat is the village of Cedry Wielkie, which lies approximately 15 kilometres (9 mi) east of Pruszcz Gdański and 20 km (12 mi) south-east of the regional capital Gdańsk.

The gmina covers an area of 124.28 square kilometres (48.0 sq mi), and as of 2006 its total population is 6,156.

== Villages ==
Gmina Cedry Wielkie contains the villages and settlements of Błotnik, Cedry Małe, Cedry Wielkie, Długie Pole, Giemlice, Kiezmark, Koszwały, Leszkowy, Miłocin, Miłocin Drugi, Serowo, Stanisławowo, Szerzawa, Trutnowy, Trzcinisko and Wocławy.

== Neighbouring gminas ==
Gmina Cedry Wielkie is bordered by the city of Gdańsk and by the gminas of Ostaszewo, Pruszcz Gdański, Stegna and Suchy Dąb.
