= Trutnowy =

- Village
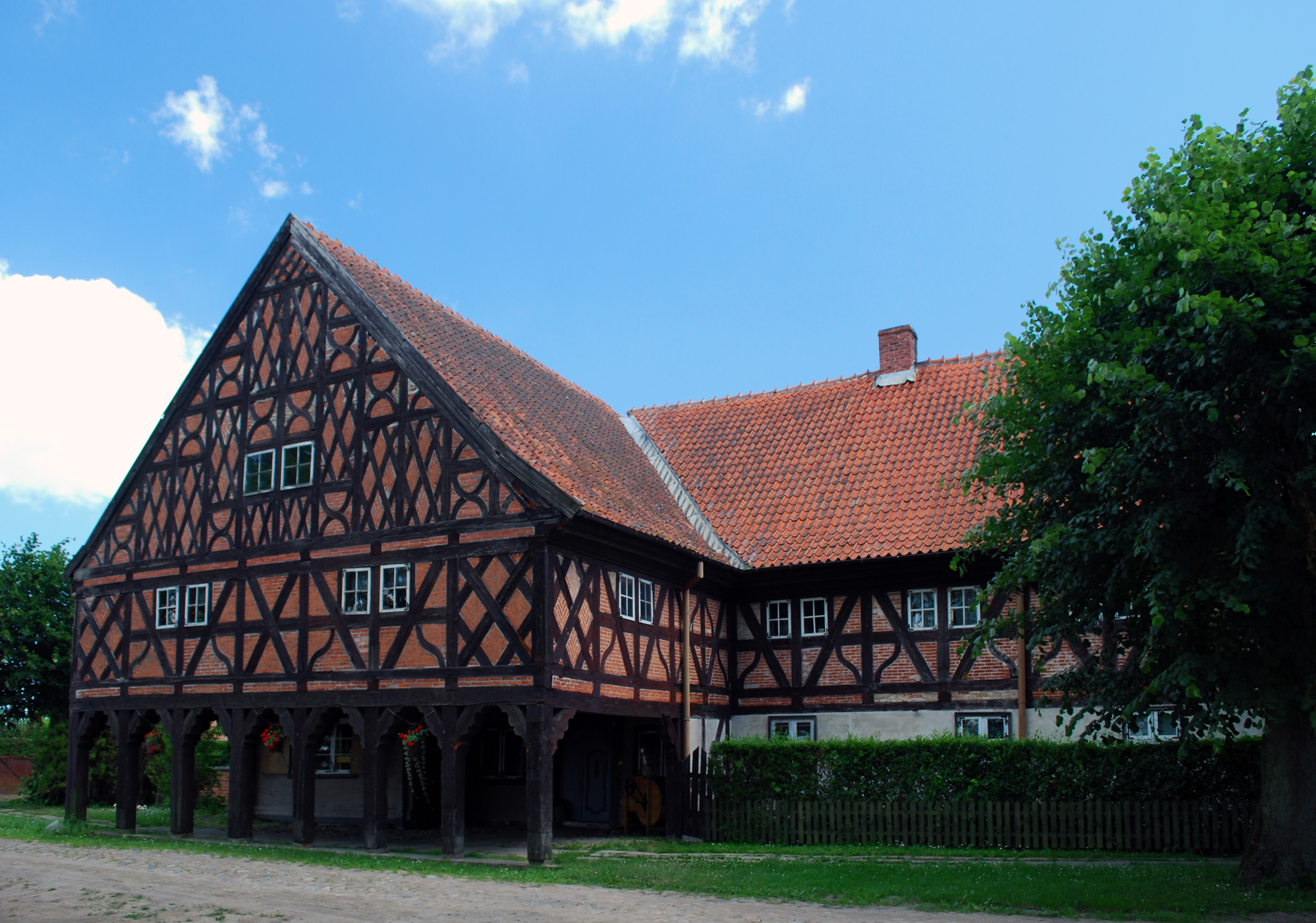

- Location within Poland
- Coordinates: 54°14′32″N 18°48′51″E
- Country: Poland
- Voivodeship: Pomeranian
- County: Gdańsk
- Gmina: Cedry Wielkie
- Population: 710

Trutnowy [trutˈnɔvɨ] is a village in the administrative district of Gmina Cedry Wielkie, within Gdańsk County, Pomeranian Voivodeship, in northern Poland.

For details of the history of the region, see History of Pomerania.
