= Giemlice =

- Village
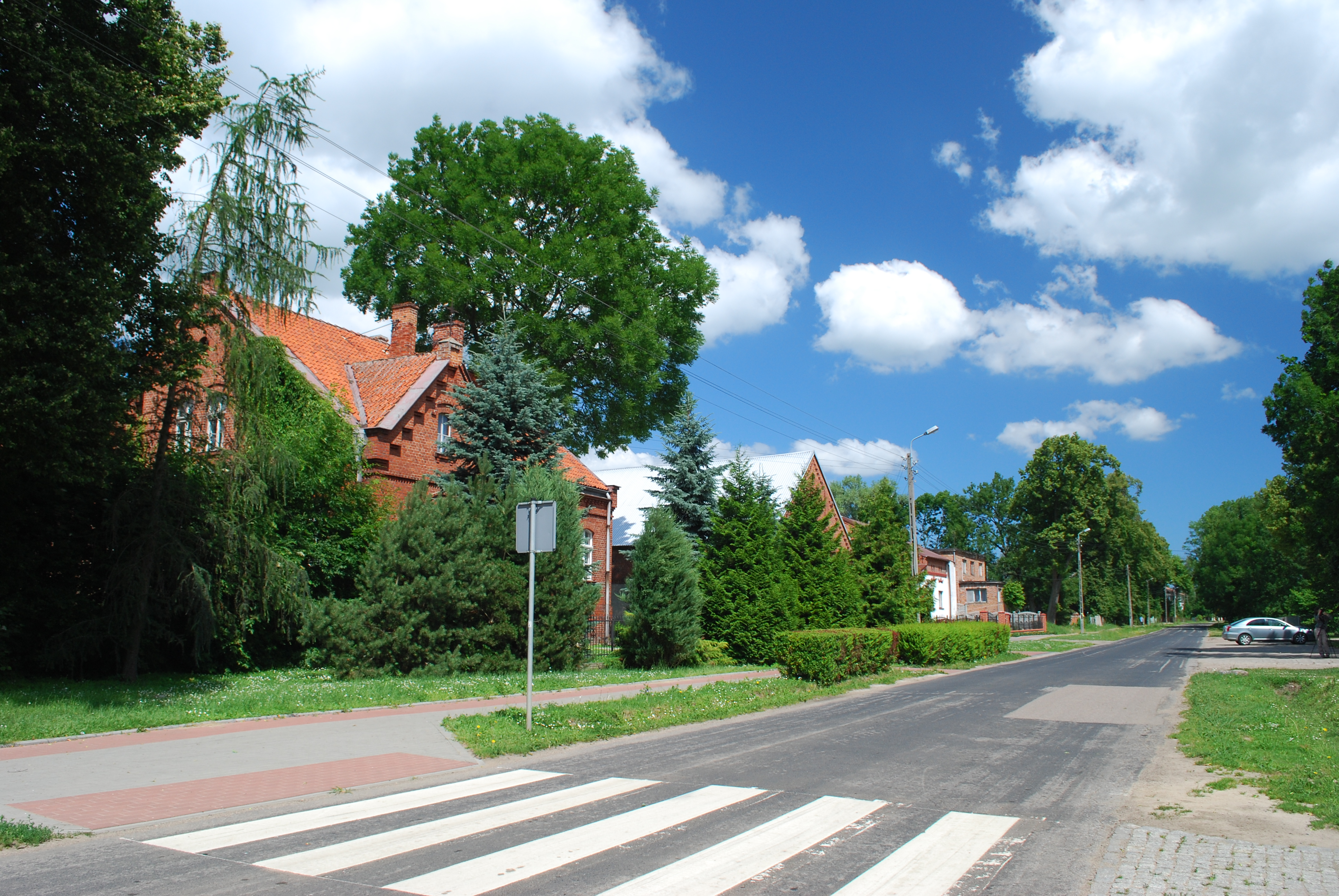

- Location within Poland
- Coordinates: 54°12′22″N 18°50′37″E
- Country: Poland
- Voivodeship: Pomeranian
- County: Gdańsk
- Gmina: Cedry Wielkie
- Population: 253
- Time zone: UTC+1 (CET)
  - Summer (DST): UTC+2 (CEST)
- Vehicle registration: GDA

Giemlice [ɡʲɛmˈlit͡sɛ] is a village in the administrative district of Gmina Cedry Wielkie, within Gdańsk County, Pomeranian Voivodeship, in northern Poland. It is located within the historic region of Pomerania.

== History ==
Giemlice was founded within medieval Poland. In 1292, Duke Mestwin II granted the village to the Cistercian monastery in Pelplin, and in 1301, the Cistercians handed it over to the Diocese of Włocławek. In 1592, Bishop Hieronim Rozdrażewski granted the village to the Jesuits. Giemlice was a private church village, administratively located in the Tczew County in the Pomeranian Voivodeship of the Polish Crown. In the late 19th century, the population was predominantly Catholic by confession.

== Gallery ==
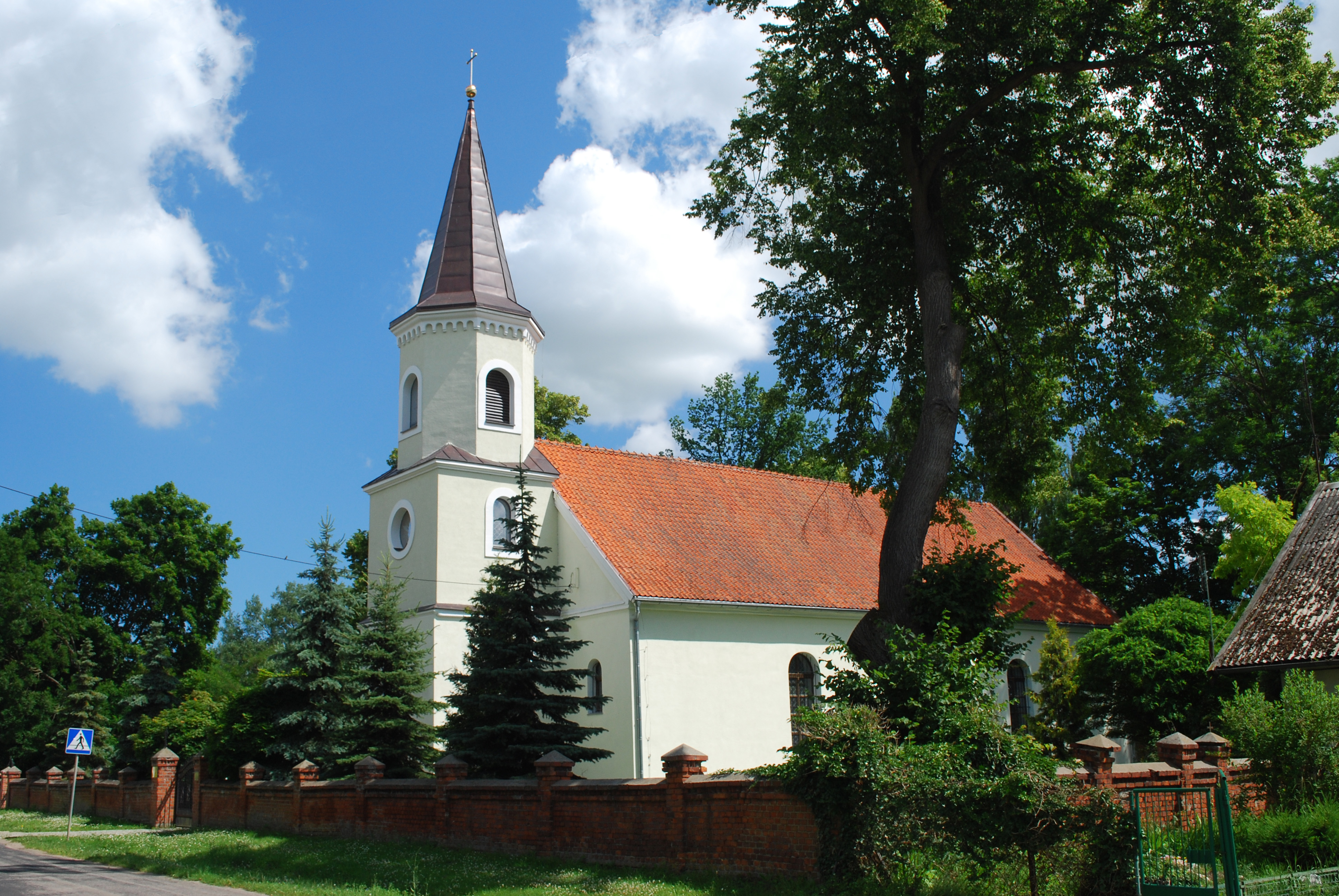
Church of Saint John the Baptist

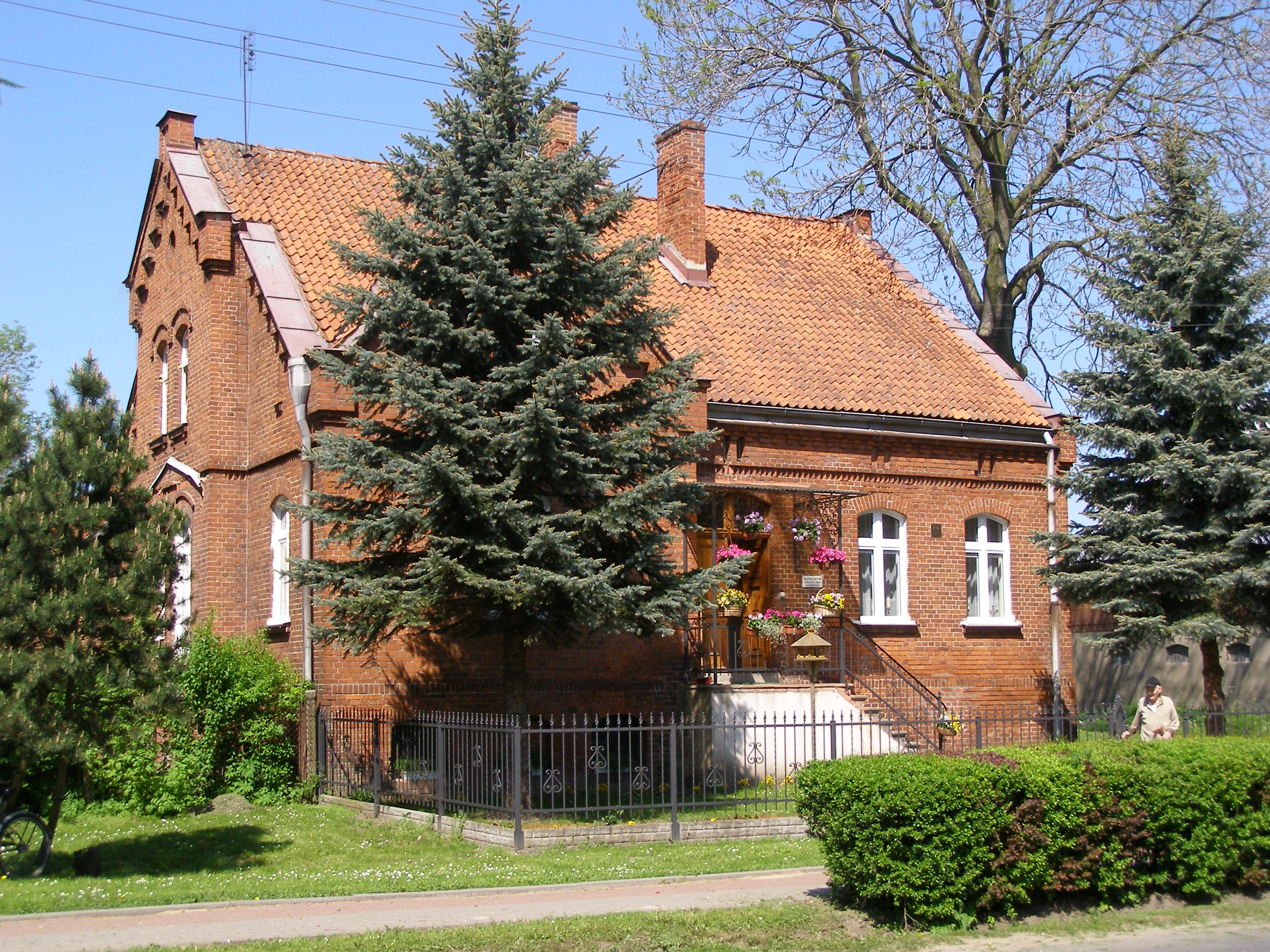
Rectory

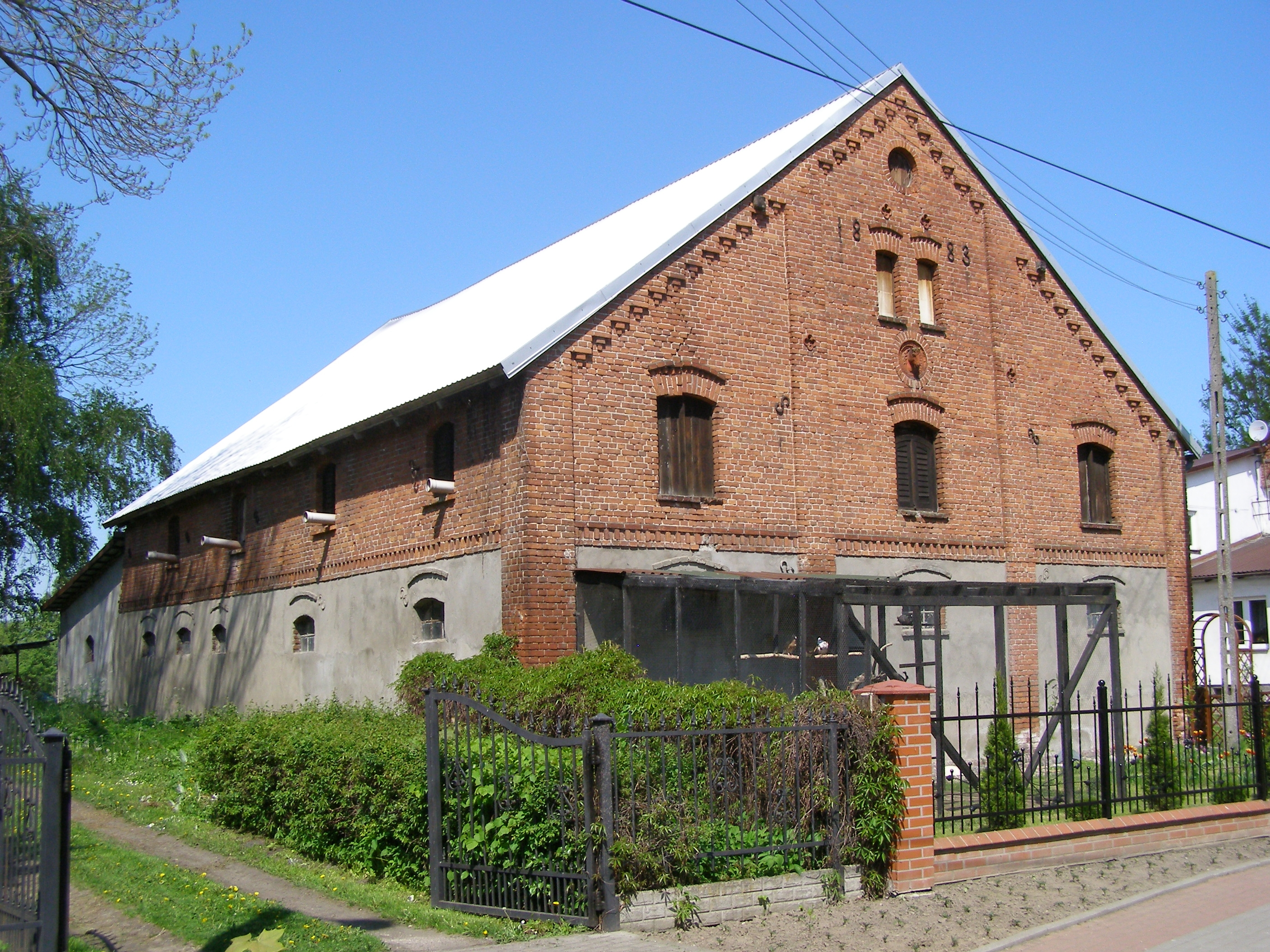
Old stable

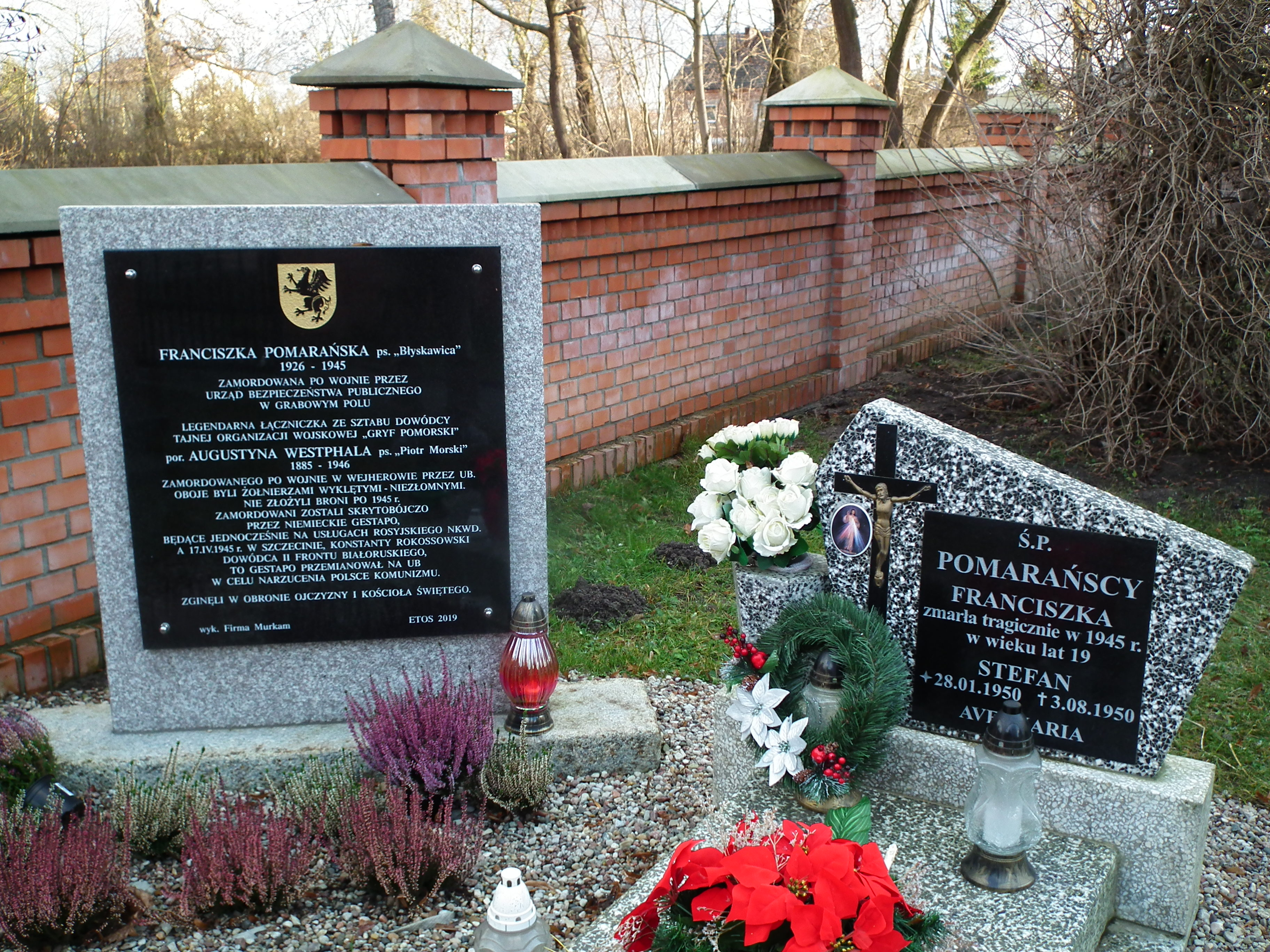
Grave of Polish resistance members killed by communists in 1945–1946
