= Kiezmark =

- Village
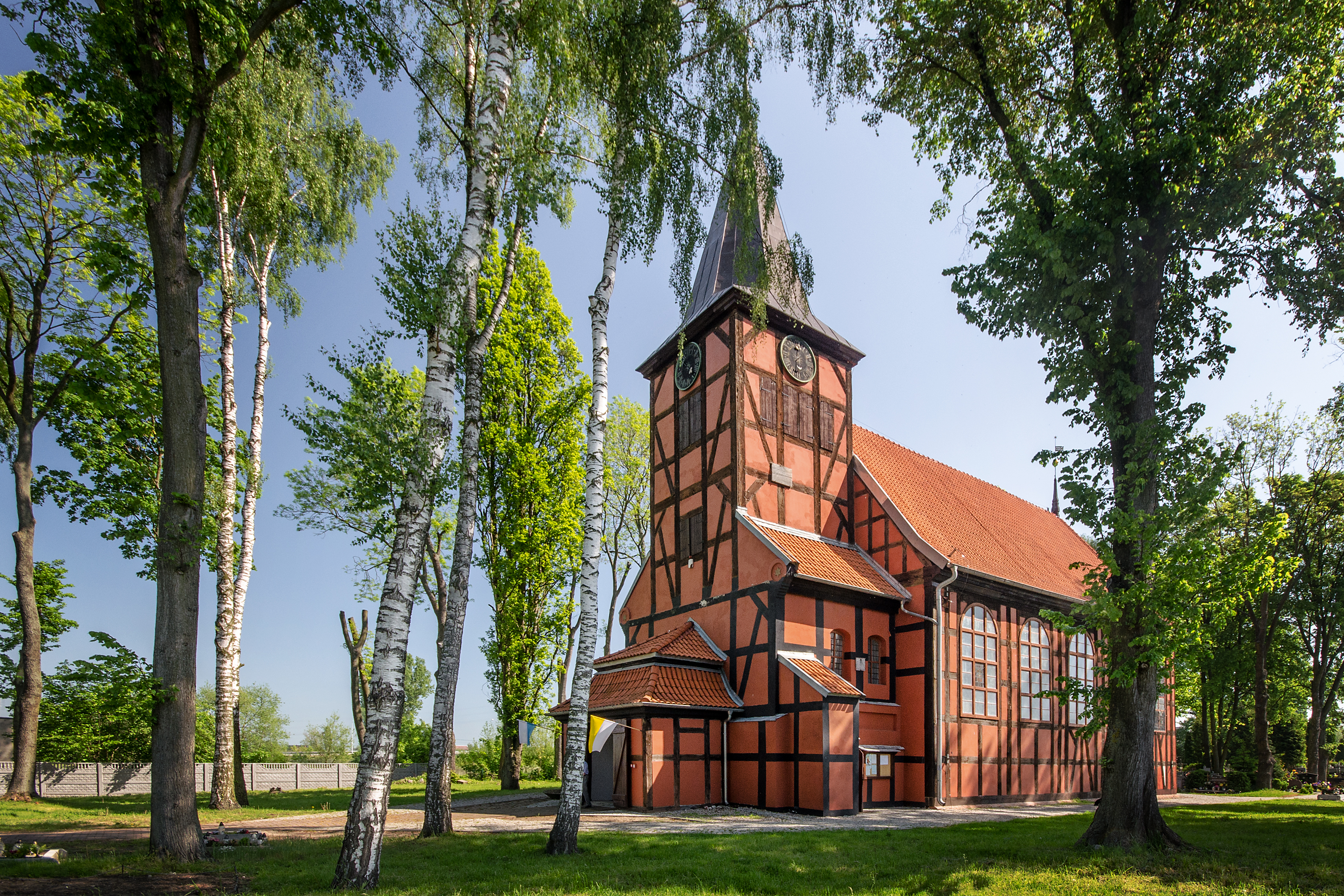
- Our Lady of Częstochowa church from 1727

- Location within Poland
- Coordinates: 54°15′20″N 18°55′50″E
- Country: Poland
- Voivodeship: Pomeranian
- County: Gdańsk
- Gmina: Cedry Wielkie
- Population: 370
- Time zone: UTC+1 (CET)
  - Summer (DST): UTC+2 (CEST)
- Vehicle registration: GDA

Kiezmark [ˈkʲɛzmark] is a village in the administrative district of Gmina Cedry Wielkie, within Gdańsk County, Pomeranian Voivodeship, in northern Poland. It is situated on the Vistula river.

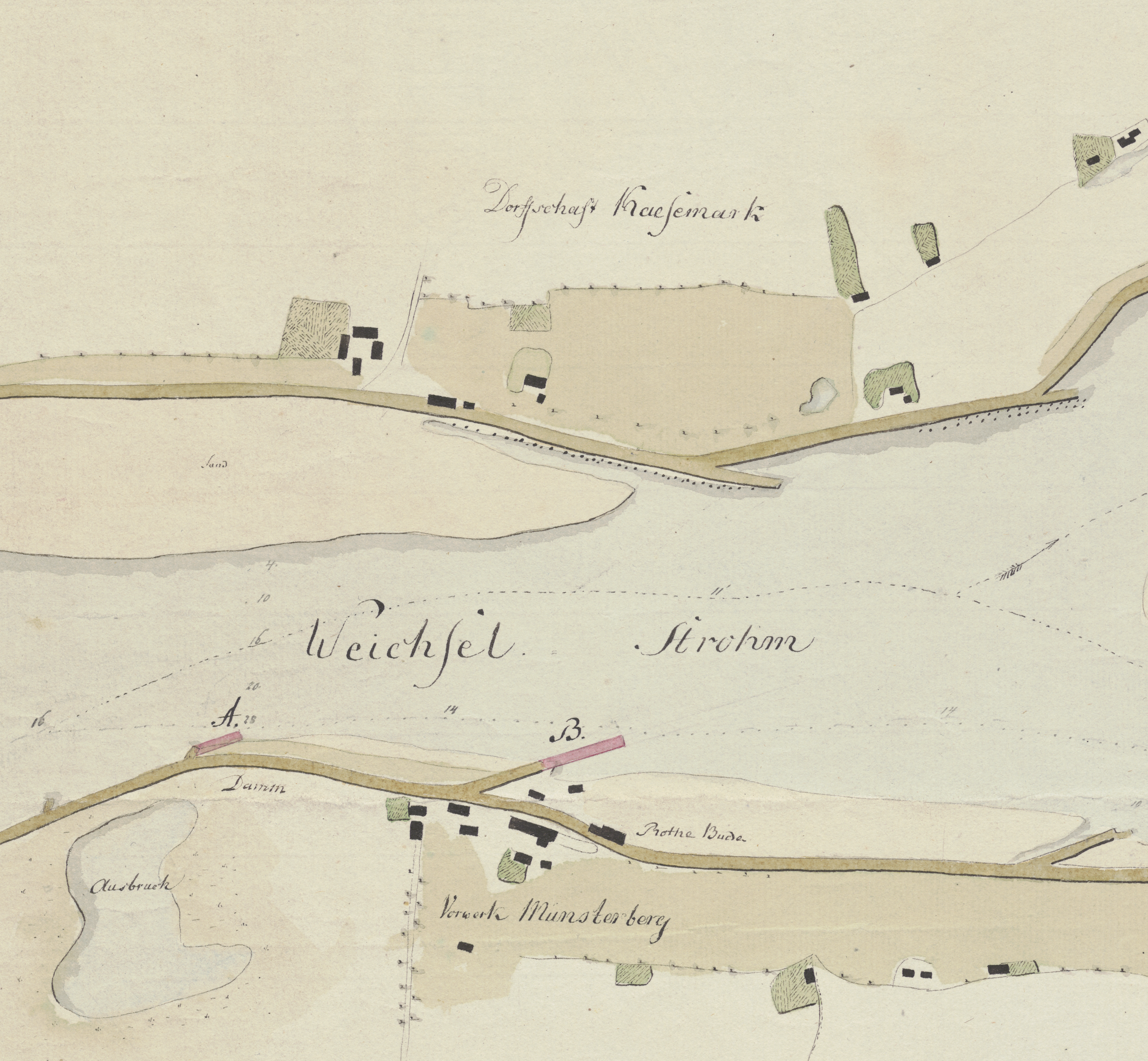
Map of Kiezmark (Käsemark) (c. 1795)

In October–December 1831, several Polish cavalry units of the November Uprising stopped in the village and its environs on the way to their final internment places.
