= Cedry Wielkie =

- Village
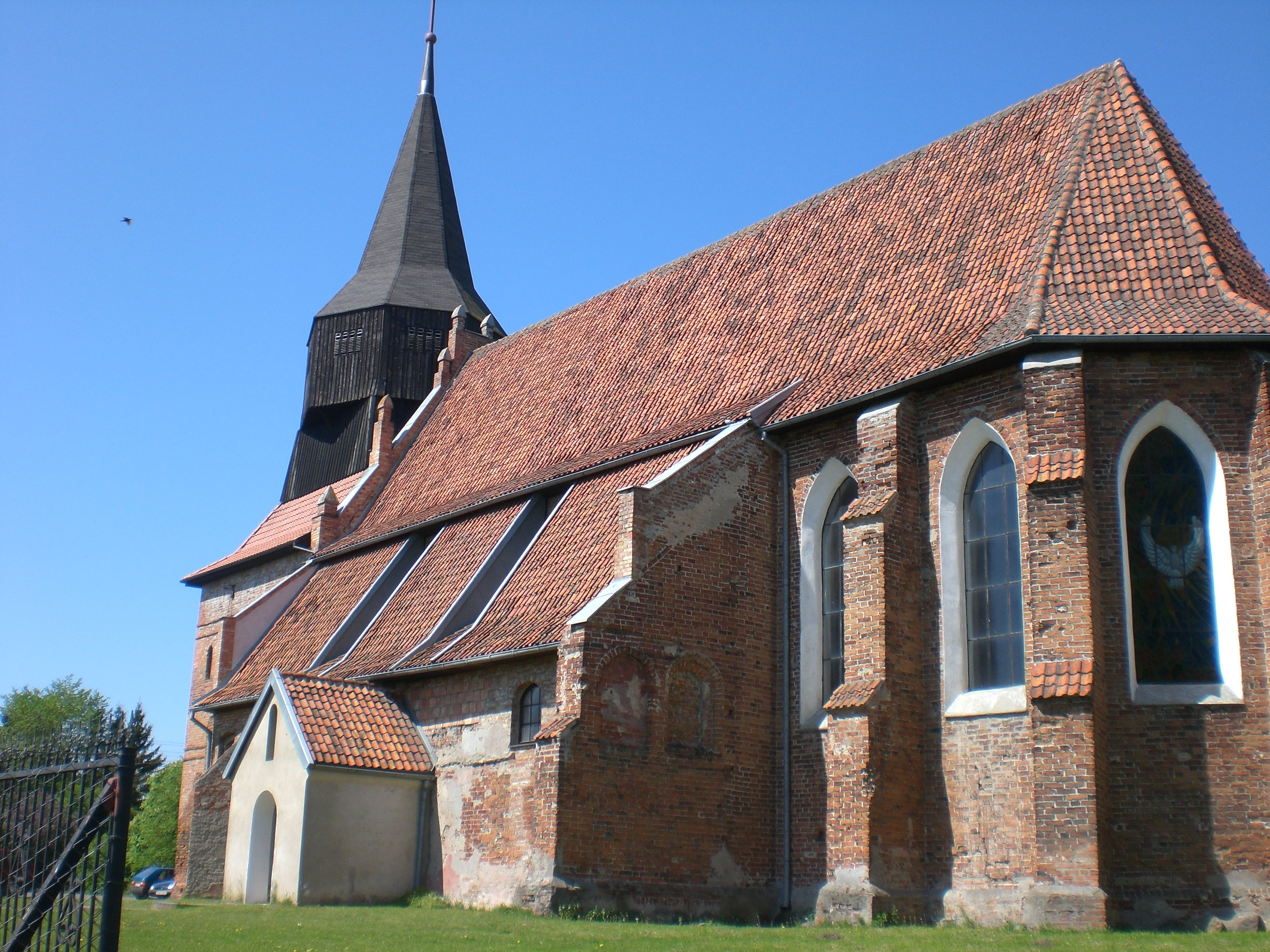
- Brick Gothic church of the Holy Guardian Angels

- Location within Poland
- Coordinates: 54°14′39″N 18°50′44″E
- Country: Poland
- Voivodeship: Pomeranian
- County: Gdańsk
- Gmina: Cedry Wielkie

Population
  - Total: 1,385

Cedry Wielkie [ˈt͡sɛdrɨ ˈvjɛlkʲɛ] is a village in Gdańsk County, Pomeranian Voivodeship, in northern Poland. It is the seat of the gmina (administrative district) called Gmina Cedry Wielkie.

For details of the history of the region, see History of Pomerania.
