= Stanisławowo, Pomeranian Voivodeship =

Stanisławowo
- Village
- Location within Poland
- Coordinates: 54°15′27″N 18°46′41″E
- Country: Poland
- Voivodeship: Pomeranian
- County: Gdańsk
- Gmina: Cedry Wielkie
- Population: 182

Stanisławowo [staniswaˈvɔvɔ] is a village in the administrative district of Gmina Cedry Wielkie, within Gdańsk County, Pomeranian Voivodeship, in northern Poland.

For details of the history of the region, see History of Pomerania.
