= Zelenogradsky District =

Zelenogradsky District Зеленоградский район (Russian)
- District
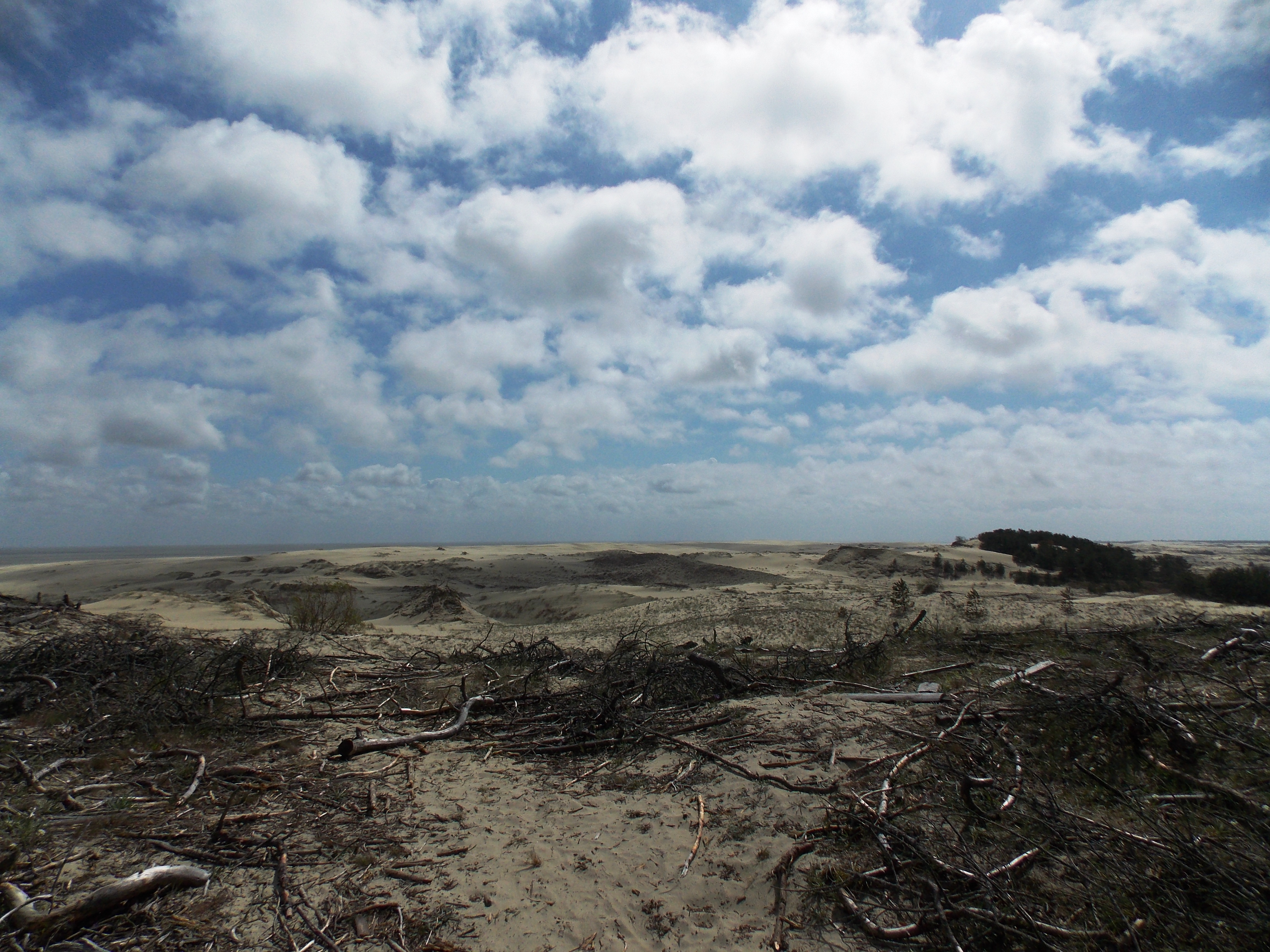
- Kurshskaya Kosa National Park in Zelenogradsky District

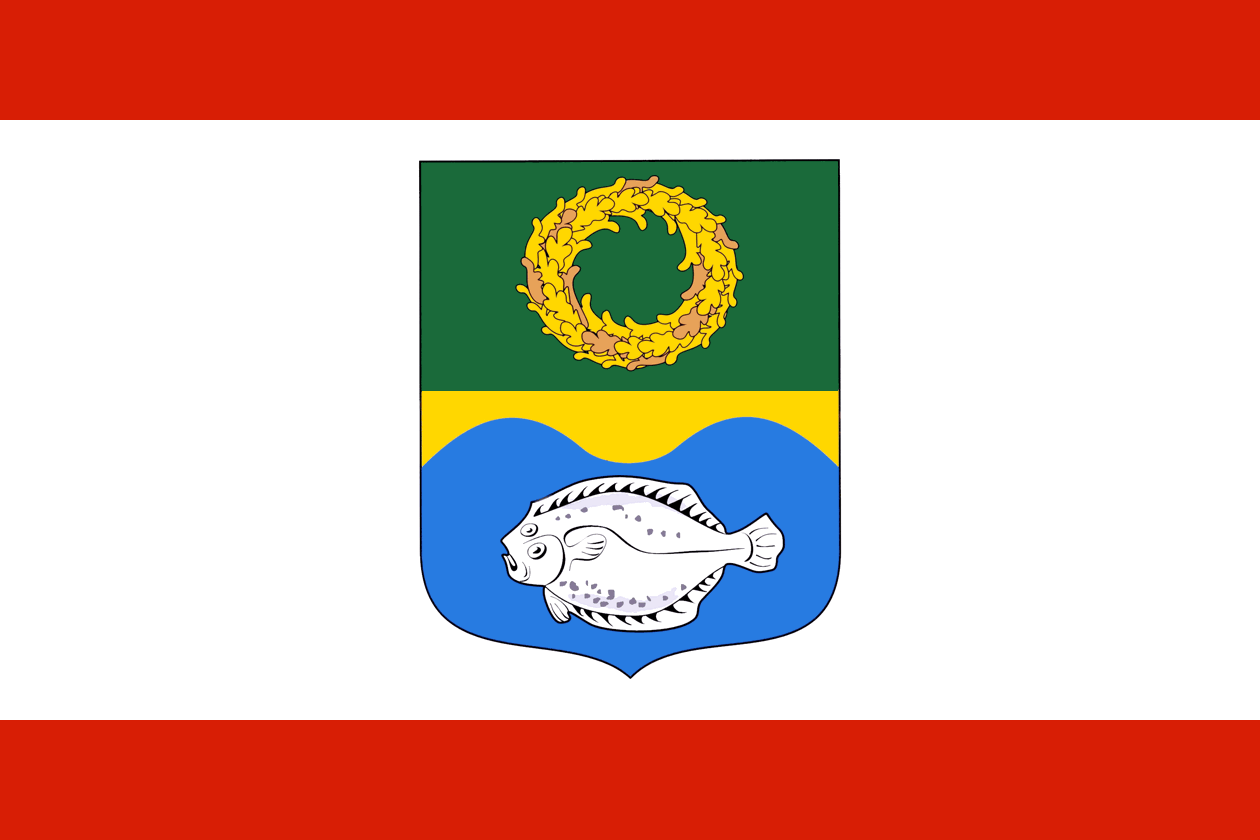
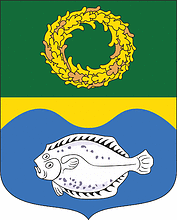
- Flag Coat of arms
- Location of Zelenogradsky District in Kaliningrad Oblast
- Coordinates: 54°57′N 20°29′E
- Country: Russia
- Federal subject: Kaliningrad Oblast
- Established: 7 September 1946
- Administrative center: Zelenogradsk

Area
  - Total: 2,016 km^{2} (778 sq mi)

Population (2010 Census)
  - Total: 32,271
  - Density: 16.01/km^{2} (41.46/sq mi)
  - Urban: 40.4%
  - Rural: 59.6%

Administrative structure
  - Administrative divisions: 1 Towns of district significance, 4 Rural okrugs
  - Inhabited localities: 1 cities/towns, 111 rural localities

Municipal structure
  - Municipally incorporated as: Zelenogradsky Urban Okrug
- Website: http://www.zelenogradsk.com

Zelenogradsky District (Russian: Зеленогра́дский райо́н) is an administrative district (raion), one of the fifteen in Kaliningrad Oblast, Russia. It is located in the west of the oblast. The area of the district is 2,016 square kilometers (778 sq mi). Its administrative center is the town of Zelenogradsk. Population: 32,271 (2010 census); 32,504 (2002 Census); 27,697 (1989 Soviet census). The population of Zelenogradsk accounts for 40.4% of the district's total population.

== Administrative and municipal status ==
Within the framework of administrative divisions, Zelenogradsky District is one of the fifteen in the oblast. The town of Zelenogradsk serves as its administrative center.

As a municipal division, the district has been incorporated as Zelenogradsky Urban Okrug since May 15, 2015. Prior to that date, the district was incorporated as Zelenogradsky Municipal District, which was subdivided into one urban settlement and four rural settlements. In 2022, Zelenogradsky was changed from an administrative district into a municipal district.

== People ==
- Karl Georg Otto Willibald von Kalckstein (1812 in Gauten; 1894 in Wogau) German landowner and politician
- Hans von Kanitz (1841 in Mednicken; 1913 in Podangen), German politician
