= Christoph Wilhelm von Kalckstein =

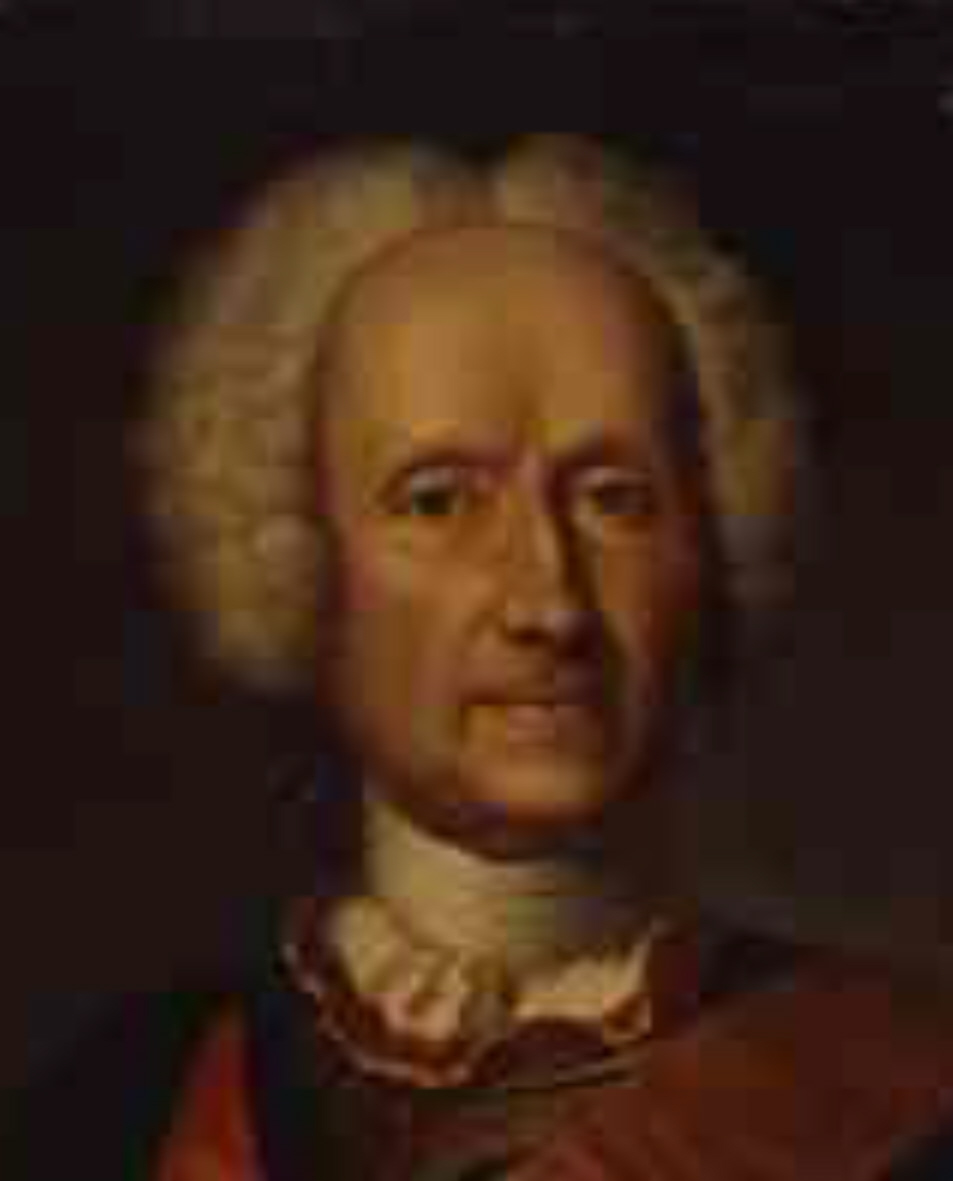
- Born: 17 October 1682; Ottlau, near Marienwerder,
- Died: 2 June 1759 (aged 76); Aschersleben
- Military career
- Allegiance: (Kingdom of Prussia) Prussia
- Branch: Army
- Rank: field marshal
- Conflicts: War of Austrian Succession
- Awards: Order of the Black Eagle; Equestrian statue of Frederick the Great

Christoph Wilhelm von Kalckstein (17 October 1682 – 2 June 1759) was a Prussian count, field marshal, teacher and educator of King Frederick II of Prussia.

== Military career ==
Kalckstein was born in Ottlau (now Gmina Gardeja) near Marienwerder, Ducal Prussia, to Christoph Albrecht von Kalckstein, laird of Knauten, Wogau and Schloditten near Pr. Eylau, and Marie Agnes von Lehwaldt. He was the grandson of Albrecht von Kalckstein and nephew of Christian Ludwig von Kalckstein, former opponents of Frederick William, Elector and Duke of Brandenburg-Prussia.

Kalckstein joined the Hesse-Kassel Grenadier Regiment in 1702, taking part in the War of the Spanish Succession in 1704 and becoming adjutant of Prince Frederick of Hesse-Kassel, the later King Frederick I of Sweden. In 1709 Kalckstein entered the Prussian Army and became a Major in the King’s own Regiment (Leibregiment zu Fuss). In 1712 he conquered the citadel of Moers with only 300 men and fought against Sweden in the Great Northern War in Pomerania in 1715. He was promoted to a lieutenant colonel on 15 November 1715.

== Educator of Frederick II of Prussia ==
After his promotion to a Colonel on 17 August 1718, Kalckstein was assigned as the educator of the Prussian crown prince, Frederick. In this position he became a conciliator in the conflict between King Frederick William I and his son. However, he was ordered to keep a strict watch on the crown prince. After his wife, Christophera Erna Lukretia Brandt von Lindau, died on 25 January 1729, he was released from this position.

== Later career ==
Kalckstein became the Commander in Chief of an Infantry Regiment, Major General on 2 May 1733, and Lieutenant General on 3 February 1741. After 5 November 1736 he was the supervisor of the Charité hospital in Berlin. In the Silesian Wars he fought at Mollwitz, Chotusitz and Hohenfriedberg, became the Governor of the Fortress Glogau, and received the Order of the Black Eagle. On 24 May 1747 he was appointed the rank of a Generalfeldmarschall.

After Crown Prince August William died in 1758, Frederick II appointed Kalckstein as a custodian and educator of the later King Fredrick William II and his brothers.

Kalckstein died in Berlin and was buried at the Berlin Garnisonkirche (Garrison Church).
