= Karl Georg Otto Willibald von Kalckstein =

Karl Georg Otto Willibald von Kalckstein (14 December 1812 – 6 June 1894) was a Prussian politician.

Kalckstein was born in Gauten (now in Zelenogradsky District), East Prussia, to Carl von Kalckstein, laird of Knauten, Wogau and Schloditten near Mühlhausen, and Charlotte Auguste von Gizycki. He died in Lermontovo Microdistrict.

Around 1830, Kalckstein joined the Prussian Army and became an Officer of the Royal Guards Regiment in Berlin. About 1842 he returned to his family's manor at Wogau. In 1848 he was elected as deputy member of the Frankfurt Parliament of the election district Heiligenbeil/Pr. Eylau and became a member of the Parliament on 11 October 1848 after the delegate Graf Dohna-Lauck resigned his position.

From 1858 till 1876 Kalckstein was the head of the administration of the district of Pr. Eylau (Landrat) and member of the North German Confederation parliament and the Reichstag from 1867 - 1873. He was also a member of the Zollparlament from 1868 to 1870.
