= Ludwig Karl von Kalckstein =

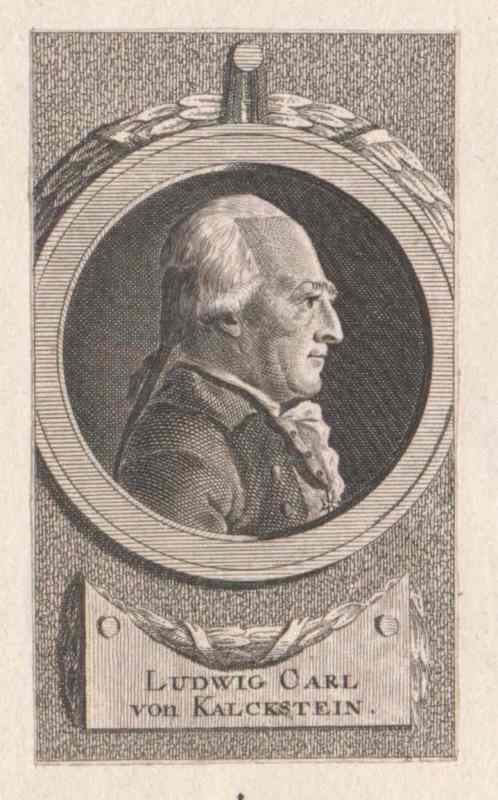
- Born: 10 March 1725
- Died: 12 October 1800
- Occupation: German general

Ludwig Karl von Kalckstein (10 March 1725 – 12 October 1800) was a Prussian count and field marshal.

Kalckstein was born in Berlin to Christoph Wilhelm von Kalckstein, laird of Knauten, Wogau and Graventhien near Mühlhausen in East Prussia, and Christophore Erna von Brandt. He became an officer in the Prussian Army and served in Prince Henry of Prussia's regiment, which led to a close relationship between Kalckstein and the Prince. In 1778 he was retired as a major general by Frederick II of Prussia and returned to his family's manor in East Prussia. After the death of Frederick II he was reenacted by Frederick William II of Prussia in 1786. In 1790 he received the Order of the Black Eagle and in 1798 he was promoted to a Generalfeldmarschall. Kalckstein became the governor of the Fortress Magdeburg, where he died and was buried.
