= Prussian estates =

The Prussian estates (German: Preußischer Landtag; Polish: Stany pruskie) were representative bodies of Prussia, first created by the Monastic state of Teutonic Prussia in the 14th century (around the 1370s) but later becoming a devolved legislature for Royal Prussia within the Kingdom of Poland. They were at first composed of officials of six big cities of the region; Braunsberg (Braniewo), Culm (Chełmno), Elbing (Elbląg), Danzig (Gdańsk), Königsberg (Królewiec) and Thorn (Toruń). Later, representatives of other towns as well as nobility were also included. The estates met on average four times per year, and discussed issues such as commerce and foreign relations.

== Era of Teutonic Prussia ==
Originally, the Teutonic Order created the Estate to appease the local citizens, but over time the relations between the Order and the Estates grew strained, as the Order of knights treated the local population with contempt.

Different Prussian holders of the privilege of coinage (among them the Order and some cities), actually committed to issue a Prussian currency of standardised quality, had debased the coins and expanded their circulation in order to finance the wars between Poland and Teutonic Prussia. However, this expansion disturbed the equilibrium of coins circulated to the volume of contractual obligations, only coming down due to a harsh depreciation of all existing nominally fixed contractual obligations by inflating all other non-fixed prices measured by these coins, ending only once the purchasing power of every extra issued coin equalled its material and production costs.

"Obligations would be retroactively changed if new coins, too plentifully issued, would be counted as equal to the old ones (1526, lines 307-310)." Thus a law was "passed by the Diet of Teutonic Prussia in 1418 (cf. Max Toeppen, 1878, 320seqq.), smartly regulating the fulfilment of old debts fixed in old currency by adding an agio when repaid by new coins." Thus creditors and recipients of nominally fixed revenues were not to lose by debasement-induced inflation.

As Prussia became increasingly tied economically and politically with Poland, and the wars became more and more devastating to the borderlands, and as the policies and attitude of the King of Poland were more liberal towards the Prussian burghers and nobility than that of the Order, the rift between the Teutonic Knights and their subjects widened.

The Estates drifted towards the Kingdom of Poland in their political alignment. Norman Housley noted that "The alienation of the Prussian Estates represented a massive political failure on the part of the Order".

At first, the estates opposed the Order passively, by denying requests for additional taxes and support in Order wars with Poland; by the 1440s Prussian estates acted openly in defiance of the Teutonic Order, rebelling against the knights and siding with Poland militarily (see Lizard Union, Prussian Confederation and the Thirteen Years' War).

== Era of Ducal and Royal Prussia within Poland and Poland–Lithuania ==
The estates eventually became governed by the Kingdom of Poland. First the western part of Prussia, which became known as Royal Prussia after the Second Peace of Thorn ended the Thirteen Years' War in 1466, and later the eastern lands, known as Ducal Prussia, after the Prussian Homage in 1525, became part of the kingdom. On 10 December 1525 at their session in Königsberg the Prussian estates established the Lutheran Church in Ducal Prussia by deciding the Church Order.

Nicolaus Copernicus, then canon of the Prince-Bishopric of Warmia, addressed the Prussian estates with three memoranda, in fact little essays, on currency reform. Debasements continued to ruin Prussian finances, the groat had been debased by 1/5 to 1/6 of its prior bullion content. In 1517, 1519 and again in 1526 he suggested to return to the law passed in 1418. However, especially the cities refused that. They had raised most of the funds for the warfare, and now lightened their debt burden by debasing their coinage, thus passing on part of the burden to receivers of nominally fixed revenues, such as civic and ecclesiastical creditors and civic, feudal and ecclesiastical collectors of nominally fixed monetarised dues. So Copernicus' effort failed. At least the estates refused to peg the Prussian currency to the Polish (as proposed by Ludwig Dietz), which even suffered a worse debasement than the Prussian.

Under Polish sovereignty, Prussians, particularly those from Royal Prussia, saw their liberties confirmed and expanded; local cities prospered economically (Gdańsk became the largest and richest city in the Commonwealth), and local nobility participated in the benefits of Golden Liberty, such as the right to elect the king. Royal Prussia, as a direct part of the Kingdom of Poland (and later Polish–Lithuanian Commonwealth) had more influence on Polish politics and more privileges than Ducal Prussia, which remained a fief (for example, while nobles from the Royal Prussia had their own sejmiks, Sejm and Senate representatives, those from the Duchy did not). Royal Prussia also had its own parliament, the Prussian Landesrat, although it was partially incorporated into the Commonwealth Sejm after the Union of Lublin, it retained distinct features of Royal Prussia.

=== Local estates sending envoys to Royal Prussia's estates ===
In the following towns local estates used to gather to elect their envoys to Royal Prussia's estates.

- Człuchów (for the County of Człuchów), two envoys elected,
- Kowalewo Pomorskie (for the Chełmno Voivodeship), two envoys elected,
- Malbork (for the Malbork Voivodeship), two envoys elected,
- Mirachowo (for the County of Mirachowo), two envoys elected,
- Puck (for the County of Puck), two envoys elected,
- Starogard Gdański (for the Counties of Gdańsk, Tczew, Nowe, and in 1642–1655 for the Lauenburg and Bütow Land), two envoys elected; in 1642–1655, four envoys elected,
- Świecie (for the County of Świecie), two envoys elected,
- Tuchola (for the County of Tuchola), two envoys elected.

== Era of the Kingdom of Prussia ==
With the power of the Polish–Lithuanian Commonwealth waning from the mid-17th century onwards, the Prussian Estates drifted under the influence of the Hohenzollern Electors of Brandenburg, who ruled Ducal Prussia in personal union with Brandenburg from 1618 (first the eastern Duchy of Prussia, sovereign after the Treaty of Wehlau in 1657 and upgraded to the Kingdom of Prussia in 1701; then the western Royal Prussia, annexed to the former after the First Partition of Poland in 1772). Under the Hohenzollerns' absolutist rule the power of the Estates increasingly diminished.

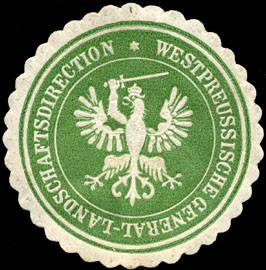
Sealing stamp of the Westpreussische Landschaft

The West and East Prussian Estates, separately (the latter gathering after 1772 representatives of newly formed East Prussia, comprising the former Duchy of Prussia and the parts of former Royal Prussia west of the Vistula), again played a role in the transformation from feudal traditional agriculture to agricultural business. The Silesian Wars of 1740-1763 had required high taxes, such that many Prussian tax-payers went into debt. Feudal manor estates were not free property sellable at the will of their holders or – in case of over-indebtedness – by way of execution prompted by the creditors of the holders. So the holders of feudal manor estates found it difficult to borrow against their estates. Therefore, in 1787 the West Prussian estates, and a year later the East Prussian estates, each took on the task of forming credit corporations: the Westpreussische Landschaft and the Ostpreussische Landschaft, respectively.

Members of the Estates, then by status mostly noble landed manor holders, and the circle of potential debtors were literally the same. In order to overcome the restrictions on selling manor estates to fulfil outstanding debts, the manor estate holders formed a corporation of mutually liable debtors. So solvent manor estate holders had to step in for over-indebted borrowers, thus transforming the manor estate holders into a corporation of collective liability. Covering over-indebted borrowers imposed hardship for the solvent manor-estate holders. This affected many opinions and even aroused appeals to abolish the feudal system of manor estate holding, while others demanded the re-establishment of pure feudalism without borrowing at all.

In the Napoleonic era (ca 1799-1815) the East Prussian Estates gained some political influence again. King Frederick William III of Prussia needed to raise funds in order to pay the enormous French war contributions of thaler 140 million imposed after Prussia's defeat of 1806, and making up about an annual pre-war budget of the government. In 1807 the East Prussian Estates made a political bargain on accepting the king as a member within their credit corporation with his royal East Prussian demesnes, to be encumbered as security for the Pfandbriefe to be issued in his favour, which he was to sell to investors, thus raising credit funds.

In return the Estates reached a wider representation of further parts of the population. The reformed body included two new groups:

- the East Prussian free peasants, called Kölmer (holders of free estates according to Culm law) and forming a considerable group only in former Teutonic Prussia holding about a sixth of the arable East Prussian land, and
- non-noble holders of manor estates, who had meanwhile acquired 10% of the feudal land mostly by eventual, but complicated and – subject to government authorisation – purchases of manor estates from over-indebted noble landlords.

With representation in the estates the newly represented groups were also entitled to eventually raise credits, obliged to liability for credits of others, but simultaneously gained a say in the Estates assembly.

On 9 October 1807 the reforming Prussian minister Heinrich vom und zum Stein prompted Frederick William III to decree the October Edict (Edict concerning the relieved possession and the free usage of real estate [landed property] as well as the personal relations of the rural population) which generally transformed all kind of landholdings into free allodial property. This act enormously increased the amount of alienable real estate in Prussia apt to be pledged as security for credits, needed so much to pay the higher taxes in order to finance Napoléon's warfare through the compulsory war contributions to France. Serfdom was thus also abolished. Most remaining legal differences between the estates (classes) were abolished in 1810, when almost all Prussian subjects – former feudal lords, serfs, burghers (city dwellers), free peasants, Huguenots etc., turned into citizens of Prussia. The last excepted group - the Jews - became citizens in 1812.

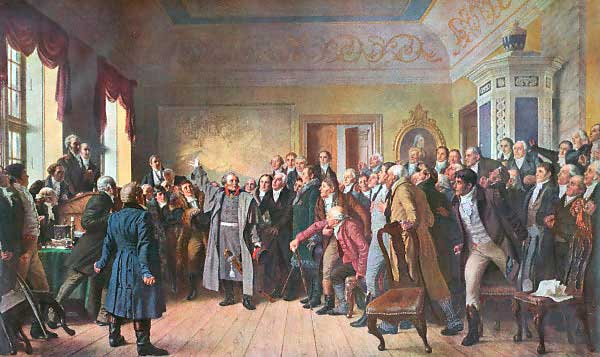
Yorck addressing the East Prussian Estates on 5 February 1813. History painting of 1888 by Otto Brausewetter.

When in 1813 the defeated and intimidated King Frederick William III, forced into a coalition with France from 1812, refrained to take his chance to shake off the French supremacy in the wake of Napoleon's defeats in Russia, the East Prussian estates stole a march on the king. On 23 January Count Friedrich Ferdinand Alexander zu Dohna-Schlobitten, president of the Estates assembly, called its members for 5 February 1813.

After debating the appeal of Ludwig Yorck, illoyal and – therefore by Berlin – outlawed general of the Prussian auxiliary corps within Napoléon's army, to form a liberation army, which was widely agreed, on February 7 the East Prussian estates unanimously voted for financing, recruiting and equipping a militia army (Landwehr) of 20,000 men, plus 10,000 in reserve, out of their funds - following a proposal designed by Yorck, Clausewitz and Stein. The hesitant king could not stop this anymore, but only approve it (17 March 1813).

However, this civic act of initiating Prussia's participation in the liberation wars did not meet with the gratitude of the monarch, who again and again procrastinated over his promise to introduce a parliament of genuine legislative competence for all the monarchy. Only in the wake of the Revolutions of 1848 did Prussia receive its first constitution providing for the Prussian Landtag as the parliament of the kingdom. It consisted of two chambers, the Herrenhaus (Prussian House of Lords) and the Abgeordnetenhaus (House of Representatives).

In 1899, the Prussian Landtag moved into a new building consisting of a complex of two structures, one for the House of Lords (as of 2015 used by the Bundesrat) in Leipziger Straße and one for the House of Representatives in Prinz-Albrecht-Straße, today's Niederkirchnerstraße.

The House of Lords was reorganised and renamed into the Staatsrat (state council) of the Free State of Prussia after the abolition of the monarchy in 1918. Its members were representatives of the Provinces of Prussia. Konrad Adenauer served as its president from 1921 to 1933.

Since 1993 the former House of Representatives building has served as the seat of the Abgeordnetenhaus von Berlin (House of Representatives of Berlin).

== See also ==
- Sejm of the Polish–Lithuanian Commonwealth
- Christian Ludwig von Kalckstein
