= Lizard Union (medieval) =

Organization of Prussian nobles

The Lizard Union or Lizard League (German: Eidechsenbund; Polish: Związek Jaszczurczy) was an organization of Prussian nobles and knights established in Culmerland (Chełmno Land) in 1397. Its declared goal was to combat lawlessness, although it discreetly sought the transfer of Culmerland from the Teutonic Order to Poland.

The union was founded by Nicholas von Renys, John of Pulkow, Frederick of Kitnow, and Nicholas of Kitnow. It was named after its emblem, a lizard (German: eyne eydechse), and expanded its influence to other provinces. During the Battle of Grunwald in 1410, Nicholas von Renys carried the banner of the Culmerland troops for the Teutonic Order, but lowered the banner prematurely, which was considered a signal for retreat. Some chroniclers of the time said that this contributed to the defeat of the Knights, which Heinrich von Treitschke's thesis Das deutsche ordensland Preussen popularized, but this lacks historical support. It is also possible that von Reyns didn't intentionally lower the banner early, and that it moved out of sight or fell when a bearer was killed. After their defeat at Grunwald, the Order sought to use the Lizard League as a scapegoat; the League was also believed to have been behind messages sent from Kulm advising the Order's surrender, when at the time its capital Marienburg was under Polish siege.

Renys was executed by the Order after the war, causing the remaining members of the Lizard Union to flee to Poland. The Union was declared illegal by Pope Gregory XII and Emperor Sigismund, and was subsequently dissolved in 1411. It laid the foundation, however, for the later Prussian Confederation, which requested the annexation of the State of the Teutonic Order into Poland in 1454.

== See also ==
- Military Organization Lizard Union (a namesake during World War II)
- Conrad Letzkau
- Christian Ludwig von Kalckstein
