= Albrecht von Kalckstein =

German noble (1592–1667)

Albrecht von Kalckstein (4 November 1592 – 26 May 1667) was a Prussian count, lieutenant general and opponent of Frederick William, Elector of Brandenburg.

Kalckstein was born in Königsberg (Kaliningrad) to Jakob von Kalckstein, laird of Wogau and Graventhien near Preußisch Eylau (Iławka) (today Bagrationovsk) in Ducal Prussia, and Margarete von der Gröben. He became an officer of the Electorate of Saxony and in Polish service, promoted to Rittmeister in 1625 and lieutenant colonel in 1631. Throughout the Thirty Years' War he was promoted to a Lieutenant General of Saxony in 1644. He returned to his families manor in Ducal Prussia and became a leading figure of the Prussian estates opponents of Frederick William, Elector of Brandenburg. Kalckstein was arrested in 1661 by Frederick William but pardoned short after. He died at his manor house in Knauten and was buried at his families advowson church of Tapiau (Tapiawa) (today Gvardeysk).

Kalckstein was the father of Christian Ludwig von Kalckstein, who perpetuated the opposition against Frederick William.
