= Christian Ludwig von Kalckstein =

Prussian count executed for treason

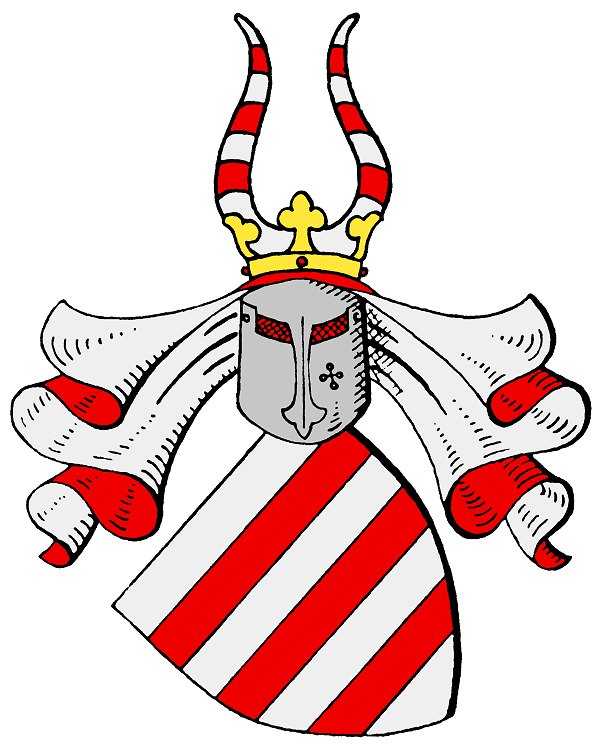
Coat of Arms of Kalckstein family

Christian Ludwig von Kalckstein (1630 – 8 November 1672) was a Prussian count, colonel, and politician who was executed for treason.

== Biography ==
Kalckstein was the son of Count Albrecht von Kalckstein, a strong critic of Frederick William, Elector and Duke of Brandenburg-Prussia. During his youth Kalckstein had served in the French army under Turenne, but was dismissed as being disorderly. He entered the Polish army in 1654, but fought for Duke Frederick William at the 1656 Battle of Warsaw, for which he was rewarded with a captaincy in the district of Oletzko (Olecko). In 1659 the duke dismissed Kalckstein after the clerk of Oletzko accused the young noble of embezzlement and maltreatment of his subjects.

The Kalckstein family were staunch defenders of the Prussian estates and opposed the centralizing absolutism of Frederick William; Prussia had been a fief of the Polish–Lithuanian Commonwealth until Frederick William achieved sovereignty in the 1660 Treaty of Oliva. After being dismissed from Oletzko, Kalckstein reentered the Polish army and plotted against Frederick William from the Polish capital, Warsaw. After Albrecht's 1667 death, his sons disputed the inheritance; Christian Ludwig was accused by his siblings of conspiring to murder Frederick William and invite Polish troops into Prussia. Although his siblings' evidence was dubious, Kalckstein contrived the idea of asking his servants to perjure on his behalf in the case. When this was found out, Kalckstein was convicted of lèse majesté and sentenced to life imprisonment. Upon the arrival of the duke in the Prussian capital, Königsberg, the following year, Kalckstein begged for mercy and had his sentence reduced to a fine and exile to his estate.

In March 1670 the Junker fled by sledge to Warsaw to present a protest to the Sejm of the Polish–Lithuanian Commonwealth as the self-appointed representative of the Prussian estates.

Frederick William was alarmed that the rebellious Kalckstein would inspire opposition in the estates, which met in July 1670 to discuss the duke's requests for funds for his army. When King Michał Korybut Wiśniowiecki of Poland refused to extradite Kalckstein, Frederick William ordered his diplomat in Warsaw, Eusebio von Brandt, to capture Kalckstein. Brandt had the noble secretly bundled in a carpet and returned to Prussia at the end of 1670.

Frederick William disregarded Michał's objections, accurately predicting the Polish king would not make "an elephant out of a gnat". In order to make an example for the Prussian estates, the duke had Kalckstein tried in 1671 by a special court consisting mostly of non-Prussians. The prisoner was also tortured in order to reveal his accomplices. Kalckstein was sentenced to death in January 1672 and beheaded at Memel on 8 November 1672. The execution of Kalckstein, the only political execution during Frederick William's reign, contributed to the submission of the estates to the duke's authority during the 1670s.

In his last letters to his family Kalckstein asked his wife to move to Poland and there, raise their children up in the Lutheran faith and teach their children the fundamentals of arithmetic as well as the Polish language. In a separate letter to his children he told them to "learn Polish, and secure yourselves in Poland for there is no place for us left in the now enslaved Prussia".

== In popular culture ==
Von Kalckstein was the prototype for the character of Krzysztof Dowgird in a popular 70's Polish TV action series Czarne Chmury (Dark Clouds).

== See also ==
- Lizard Union (medieval)
- Conrad Letzkau

== Sources ==
- F. L. Carsten, The New Cambridge Modern History: volume V: the ascendancy of France 1648-88, CUP Archive, 1961, ISBN 0-521-04544-4, Google Print, p.549
- Fay, Sidney B.; Klaus Epstein (1964). The Rise of Brandenburg-Prussia to 1786: Revised Edition. New York: Holt, Rinehart and Winston. p. 146.
- Koch, H. W. (1978). A History of Prussia. New York: Barnes & Noble Books. p. 326. ISBN 0-88029-158-3.
- McKay, Derek (2001). The Great Elector. Harlow: Pearson. p. 286. ISBN 0-582-49482-6.
- Margaret Shennan, The Rise of Brandenburg-Prussia, Routledge, 1995, ISBN 0-415-12938-9, Google Print, p.34
