= Roman Śledź =

Polish folk art sculptor

Roman Śledź, a contemporary Polish folk art sculptor, was born on 12 May 1948 in the village of Malinówka within the Gmina Cyców, Lublin Voivodeship, Poland.

His roots are from a small village peasant family. He completed elementary school but his education was disrupted at age 16 by the death of his father. Shortly after that he and his mother ran a farm together and simultaneously he started supporting his younger siblings. In the years 1968 to 1970 he worked as a tractor driver with a farmers' association in Cyców and additionally on construction work in Lublin. In 1968, at the age of 20, intrigued by an article he had read in the Gazeta Lubelska newspaper about sculptors from Wola Korybutowa, (Note: Possibly Stanisław Szulc and his son Tadeusz, from one or other of the neighbouring villages of Wola Korybutowa Druga, Wola Korybutowa Pierwsza and Wola Korybutowa-Kolonia in Gmina Siedliszcze, Chelm County.) he made an attempt to carve his first sculpture. For his first work of art in 1969, he received a diploma from a Museum in Lublin. Since that time he has received numerous prizes and awards and interest from collectors of folk art.

The first of the collectors who established contacts with Roman Śledź was Ludwig Zimmerer, a distinguished collector of Polish folk art and a German journalist and correspondent for the West German Media in Poland. Shortly after that, thanks to the recommendation from Polish Academy of Sciences Ethnological Committee Prof. Aleksander Jackowski to the Cepelia Association which arranged his first individual exhibition in Warsaw in 1978. Other individual exhibitions are as follows: Bern (1980), Frankfurt (1981), Sande (Germany, 1994), Budlewo (Poland, 2005), Warsaw (2006), Białystok (Poland, 2007), Chełm (Poland, 2013), Oldenburg (Germany, 2014), Bad Pyrmont (Germany, 2015).

His works of art were also a part of numerous collective exhibitions in the US, the Netherlands and in Italy. In 2004, he was invited to attend the International Folk Art Market in Santa Fe, New Mexico. Today, this Market is the largest juried international folk art market in the world.

An interest from foreign art lovers appeared during the 1980s which created problems for Roman Śledź. The frequent artist contacts with foreigners started to worry the Ministry of Public Security of Poland. Officers of the Ministry were not able to understand the popularity of his art abroad and because of that Roman Śledź needed to appear repeatedly for audits by the Ministry. During auditions he explained that his contacts with foreigners, participation in foreign exhibitions or sculpting for German churches did not pose a threat to public security.

== Awards and recognition ==
Roman Śledź was admitted to the Polish Folk Artists' Society in 1980 and was entered into the list of folk artists' of the "Cepelia" association in 1983.

In 1979 Roman received the Brother Albert Prize (Polish: nagroda imienia Brata Alberta) for religious output.

In 2002, he received the Oskar Kolberg Award For Merit to Folk Culture (Polish: Nagroda im. Oskara Kolberga "Za zasługi dla kultury ludowej").

Roman Śledź lives in Malinówka sculpting biblical scenes.

== Cinematography about Roman Śledz ==
- „Zaproszenie do wnętrza” Andrzej Wajda (1976)
- „Sztuka z pod strzechy” Andrzej Różycki (1998)
