= Wola Korybutowa =

Wola Korybutowa may refer to the following locations in Poland:

- Wola Korybutowa Pierwsza
- Wola Korybutowa Druga
- Wola Korybutowa-Kolonia
- Gromada Wola Korybutowa
