= Śledź =

Śledź is a Polish surname. Notable people with the surname include:

- Roman Śledź (born 1948), Polish sculptor
- Mirosław Śledź (born 1961), Polish painter
- Dariusz Śledź (born 1969), Polish motorcycle speedway rider
