= Paweł Tuchlin =

Polish serial killer

- Born: Paweł Alojzy Tuchlin; 28 April 1946; Góra, Kościerzyna County, Poland
- Died: 25 May 1987 (aged 41); Gdańsk, Poland
- Cause of death: Execution by hanging
- Other name: The Scorpion
- Convictions: Murder (9 counts); Attempted murder (11 counts)
- Penalty: Death

Details
- Victims: 9
- Span of crimes: 1975–1983
- Country: Poland

Paweł Alojzy Tuchlin (April 28, 1946 – May 25, 1987), also known as the Scorpion, was a Polish kidnapper, serial rapist and serial killer. From 1975 to 1983, Tuchlin kidnapped and assaulted 20 women in the city of Gdańsk, murdering nine of them with a hammer. He was arrested in May 1983 on an unrelated theft charge, and subsequently charged with murder after the police found his blood-stained hammer during a search of his farm.

On August 6, 1985, Tuchlin was convicted on nine counts of first-degree murder and eleven counts of attempted murder, and sentenced to death. Following an unsuccessful appeal, the sentence was carried out by hanging on May 25, 1987.

== Childhood and youth ==
Paweł Tuchlin was born on April 28, 1946 in the Polish village of Góra to Bernard Tuchlin, an alcoholic farmer, and Monika Tuchlin (née Weier). He was the eighth of 11 children. As a child, Tuchlin endured physical and verbal abuse from his parents due to frequently wetting the bed, a habit that continued into his teenaged years. Tuchel described the effects of the abuse he suffered during his court deposition:

"My illness was that I was soaking in my sleep during the night. And the only medicine available to me at home was 'pyda', a weave of thongs. When morning came, my mother or father checked the bed. When it was wet, I got a dose of the 'medicine'. The next day, the scene was repeated; because my father was of the opinion that I was lying in my bed maliciously or out of laziness... They disliked me, especially when Dad drank, which happened often. At the time, Paweł was no longer there, he was only "dujcok", "piss" and "skunk"... Then I grew up, from time to time there was some kind of fun in the town centre, it went, but it all went with me. You wanted to dance, good, you go, ask a girl, and she knows you, it's her, I do not know, but I think it's a shame to dance with someone who is soaked, says: "Stinks, I do not want to dance with you", or something like that."

After completing his schooling, Tuchlin joined the Polish military service, but was discharged after a few months when it was discovered that he was hard of hearing.

Tuchlin later left home and moved to Gdańsk, where he got a job as a driver and married his first wife. During this period, he was charged and sentenced for a series of minor thefts, and served the sentences over a period of time from 20 December 1976 to 28 June 1979. Tuchlin then divorced his wife and remarried a woman named Regina. His neighbours in Gdańsk described him as a calm, stable, resourceful man who was introverted but cared for his wife and two children.

== Murders and sexual assaults ==
Tuchlin stalked and attacked his victims in several towns within the Elbląg and Bydgoszcz voivodeships, including Starogard Gdański, Skarszewy, and Skowarcz. His youngest victim was 18 years old, and the oldest 35.

List of deaths

Nmb.	Name	Age	Date of death	Place of murder
1.	Irena H.	18	9 November 1979	Niestępowo
2.	Anastazja E.	30	1 February 1980	Gdańsk
3.	Alicja M.	35	29 April 1980	Skowarcz
4.	Cecylia G.	22	17 September 1980	Lubiki
5.	Izabela S.	22	19 November 1980	Malbork
6.	Wanda K.	30	12 December 1980	Gdańsk
7.	Halina G.	19	14 November 1981	Gdańsk
8.	Bożena S.	24	8 December 1982	Skarszewy
9.	Jolanta K.	19	6 May 1983	Narkowy

== Investigation and arrest ==
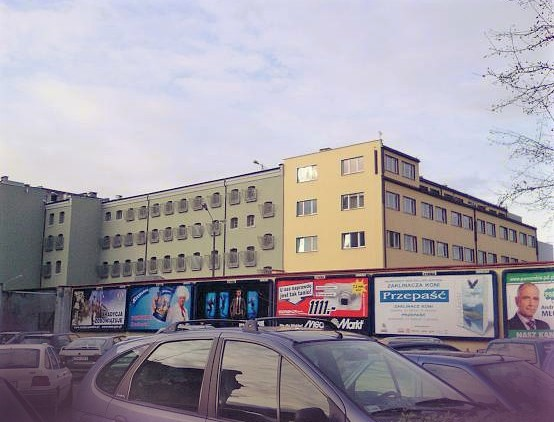
Investigation Building in Gdańsk

On November 18, 1979, Tuchlin attacked and killed his first victim, 18-year old Irena H. During the assault, he dropped the murder weapon, a hammer, which fell into the nearby Radunia river and was later recovered by investigators. The steel head of the hammer featured a 'ZNTK' engraving, indicating that it had been obtained from the Zakłady Naprawcze Taboru Kolejowego, a Polish network of railway vehicle construction and repair workshops. Despite obtaining a purchaser list from the ZNTK store in Gdańsk and interrogating the shop's workers, the police were unable to link the hammer to Tuchlin, who had worked at the company for two weeks; it is thought that Tuchlin may have stolen the weapon instead of buying it, knowing the purchase would be documented.

On 6 January 6, 1983, a special group consisting of 11 investigators was formed at the Provincial Police Headquarters in Gdańsk, by which time Tuchlin had killed seven more women. The group gave Tuchlin the code name "Scorpion", and began to track his movements.

On May 31, 1983, Tuchlin was arrested at the age of 37, on the suspicion of stealing wood. During a subsequent police search of his farm, investigators found a blood-stained hammer in the trunk of Tuchlin's vehicle. Tuchlin was taken in for questioning, and spent six months undergoing psychiatric observation in a facility in Szczecin. During his time at the facility, Tuchlin displayed aberrant behavior, constructing multiple sculptures depicting female genitalia using bread and saliva. He reportedly fell in love with a psychiatrist at the facility, who suffered a nervous breakdown after he gifted her a sculpture and wrote her several sexually explicit letters.

== Trial and sentencing ==
Upon initial interrogation, Tuchlin confessed to the murder of nine of his victims, and to attempting to kill 11 more women who had escaped. He claimed that the murders helped him "feel better". However, during his court hearing, Tuchlin recanted his testimony and claimed that his confession had been coerced. Nevertheless, he was convicted of all nine murders, and on August 6, 1985, the regional court in Gdańsk sentenced him to death. The sentence was upheld by the Supreme Court of Poland upon appeal. After a further petition for leniency to the Polish Council of State was denied, Tuchlin was hanged at a local detention centre on May 25, 1987.

After Tuchlin's death, his head was removed from his body and immersed in a formalin jar, which later went missing. He was buried in the Łostowicki cemetery in Gdańsk. According to Marek Maj, one of Tuchlin's defense attorneys, several gravediggers urinated in his coffin before the lid was closed.

== See also ==
- List of serial killers by country

== Bibliography ==
- Documentary film "Skorpion" from the TVP2 series of reportages §148 Death penalty;
- "Scorpion time", Michał Pruski, Zbigniew Żukowski, KAW 1985;
- "Beasts in human skin: Tuchlin: Scorpion", documentary film, Polsat Crime, 2013.
- Documentary series shown on TVP Info and TVP Regionalna: "Zbrodni Archives" episode 11 pt. Codename Scorpion
