= Kamionka =

Kamionka may refer to any of the following places:

== Central Poland ==
=== Łódź Voivodeship ===
- Kamionka, Radomsko County
- Kamionka, Sieradz County
- Kamionka, Wieluń County
- Kamionka, Wieruszów County

=== Masovian Voivodeship (east-central) ===
- Kamionka, Ciechanów County
- Kamionka, Garwolin County
- Kamionka, Gmina Jakubów
- Kamionka, Gmina Latowicz
- Kamionka, Gmina Mszczonów
- Kamionka, Gmina Piaseczno
- Kamionka, Gmina Prażmów
- Kamionka, Gmina Radziejowice
- Kamionka, Gmina Wiskitki

=== Greater Poland Voivodeship (west-central) ===
- Kamionka, Chodzież County
- Kamionka, Czarnków-Trzcianka County
- Kamionka, Gniezno County
- Kamionka, Konin County
- Kamionka, Szamotuły County
- Kamionka, Turek County

== East Poland ==
=== Lublin Voivodeship ===
- Kamionka, Biłgoraj County
- Kamionka, Chełm County
- Kamionka, Lubartów County
- Kamionka, Łuków County
- Kamionka, Gmina Opole Lubelskie, Opole County

== North Poland ==
- Kamionka, Golub-Dobrzyń County in Kuyavian-Pomeranian Voivodeship (north-central Poland)

=== Podlaskie Voivodeship (north-east) ===
- Kamionka, Białystok County
- Kamionka, Mońki County
- Kamionka, Suwałki County

=== Pomeranian Voivodeship ===
- Kamionka, Bytów County
- Kamionka, Gmina Chojnice
- Kamionka, Chojnice County
- Kamionka, Kartuzy County
- Kamionka, Kwidzyn County
- Kamionka, Malbork County
- Kamionka, Starogard County

=== West Pomeranian Voivodeship (north-west) ===
- Kamionka, Gryfino County
- Kamionka, Stargard County
- Kamionka, Szczecinek County

=== Warmian-Masurian Voivodeship ===
- Kamionka, Iława County
- Kamionka, Nidzica County
- Kamionka, Nowe Miasto County
- Kamionka, Olsztyn County
- Kamionka, Ostróda County

== South Poland ==
- Kamionka, Lesser Poland Voivodeship
- Kamionka, Mikołów in Silesian Voivodeship
- Kamionka, Nisko County in Subcarpathian Voivodeship (south-east Poland)
- Kamionka, Opole Voivodeship (south-west Poland)
- Kamionka, Ropczyce-Sędziszów County in Subcarpathian Voivodeship (south-east Poland)

== West Poland ==
- Kamionka, Lubusz Voivodeship

== Elsewhere ==
Kamionka labour camp, satellite labour camp of the Tarnopol Ghetto, for Jewish slave workers; located in pre-war Poland, now in Ukraine

== See also ==
- Kamenka (disambiguation)
- Kamianka (disambiguation)
- Kamienka (disambiguation)
