= Dobromyśl =

Dobromyśl may refer to the following places in Poland:

- Dobromyśl, Lower Silesian Voivodeship (south-west Poland)
- Dobromyśl, Gmina Kodeń, Biała County in Lublin Voivodeship (east Poland)
- Dobromyśl, Chełm County in Lublin Voivodeship (east Poland)
- Dobromyśl, Greater Poland Voivodeship (west-central Poland)
- Dobromyśl, West Pomeranian Voivodeship (north-west Poland)
