= Kamianka =

Kamianka (Ukrainian: Кам'янка) may refer to:

== Ukraine ==
=== Populated places ===
==== Cities ====
- Kamianka, Cherkasy Oblast
- Kamianka-Buzka, Lviv Oblast
- Kamianka-Dniprovska, Zaporizhzhia Oblast

==== Rural settlements ====
- Kamianka, Polohy Raion, Zaporizhzhia Oblast

==== Villages and neighborhoods ====
- Kamianka, Volnovakha Raion, Donetsk Oblast
- Kamianka, Luhansk Raion, Luhansk Oblast
- Kamianka, Chernivtsi Oblast
- Kamianka, Dvorichna settlement hromada, Kupiansk Raion, Kharkiv Oblast
- Kamianka, Kherson Oblast
- Kamianka, Pluzhne rural hromada, Shepetivka Raion, Khmelnytskyi Oblast
- Kamianka (est. 1596), a neighborhood and a former village now in the Amur-Nyzhniodniprovskyi District of Dnipro
- Kamianka, Kurman Raion in Kurman Raion of Autonomous Republic of Crimea
- Kamianka, Vinnytsia Raion in Vinnytsia Raion of Vinnytsia Oblast
- Kamianka, Kovel Raion in Kovel Raion of Volyn Oblast
- Kamianka, Dnipro Raion in Dnipro Raion of Dnipropetrovsk Oblast
- Kamianka, Apostolove urban hromada, in Kryvyi Rih Raion of Dnipropetrovsk Oblast
- Kamianka, Sofiivka settlement hromada, in Kryvyi Rih Raion of Dnipropetrovsk Oblast
- Kamianka, Kalmiuske urban hromada, in Kalmiuske Raion of Donetsk Oblast
- Kamianka, Starobesheve settlement hromada, in Kalmiuske Raion of Donetsk Oblast
- Kamianka, Oliiivka rural hromada, in Zhytomyr Raion of Zhytomyr Oblast
- Kamianka, Popilnia settlement hromada, in Zhytomyr Raion of Zhytomyr Oblast
- Kamianka, Barashivka rural hromada, in Zviahel Raion of Zhytomyr Oblast
- Kamianka, Yarun rural hromada, in Zviahel Raion of Zhytomyr Oblast
- Kamianka, Olevsk urban hromada, in Korosten Raion of Zhytomyr Oblast
- Kamianka, Chopovychi settlement hromada, in Korosten Raion of Zhytomyr Oblast
- Kamianka, Zaporizhzhia Raion in Zaporizhzhia Raion of Zaporizhzhia Oblast
- Kamianka, Chernihivka settlement hromada, in Berdiansk Raion of Zaporizhzhia Oblast
- Kamianka, Vyshhorod Raion in Vyshhorod Raion of Kyiv Oblast
- Kamianka, Novoukrainka Raion in Novoukrainka Raion of Kirovohrad Oblast
- Kamianka, Alchevsk Raion in Alchevsk Raion of Luhansk Oblast
- Kamianka, Luhansk Raion in Luhansk Raion of Luhansk Oblast
- Kamianka, Aidar settlement hromada, in Starobilsk Raion of Luhansk Oblast
- Kamianka, Shulhynka rural hromada, in Starobilsk Raion of Luhansk Oblast
- Kamianka, Stryi Raion in Stryi Raion of Lviv Oblast
- Kamianka, Voznesensk Raion in Voznesensk Raion of Mykolaiv Oblast
- Kamianka, Nova Odesa urban hromada, in Mykolaiv Raion of Mykolaiv Oblast
- Kamianka, Chornomorske rural hromada, in Mykolaiv Raion of Mykolaiv Oblast
- Kamianka, Bilhorod-Dnistrovskyi Raion in Bilhorod-Dnistrovskyi Raion of Odesa Oblast
- Kamianka, Izmail Raion in Izmail Raion of Odesa Oblast
- Kamianka, Odesa Raion in Odesa Raion of Odesa Oblast
- Kamianka, Rozdilna Raion in Rozdilna Raion of Odesa Oblast
- Kamianka, Poltava Raion in Poltava Raion of Poltava Oblast
- Kamianka, Rivne Raion in Rivne Raion of Rivne Oblast
- Kamianka, Seredyna-Buda urban hromada, in Shostka Raion of Sumy Oblast
- Kamianka, Okhtyrka Raion in Okhtyrka Raion of Sumy Oblast
- Kamianka, Ternopil Raion in Ternopil Raion of Ternopil Oblast
- Kamianka, Beresty Raion in Berestyn Raion of Kharkiv Oblast
- Kamianka, Izium Raion in Izium Raion of Kharkiv Oblast
- Kamianka, Kupyansk Raion in Kupiansk Raion of Kharkiv Oblast
- Kamianka, Lozova Raion in Lozova Raion of Kharkiv Oblast
- Kamianka, Beryslav Raion in Beryslav Raion of Kherson Oblast
- Kamianka, Kakhovka Raion in Kakhovka Raion of Kherson Oblast
- Kamianka, Kamianets-Podilskyi Raion in Kamianets-Podilskyi Raion of Khmelnytskyi Oblast
- Kamianka, Khmelnytskyi Raion in Khmelnytskyi Raion of Khmelnytskyi Oblast
- Kamianka, Pluzhnenska rural hromada, in Shepetivka Raion of Khmelnytskyi Oblast
- Kamianka, Ulashanivka rural hromada, in Shepetivka Raion of Khmelnytskyi Oblast
- Kamianka, Chernivtsi Raion in Chernivtsi Raion of Chernivtsi Oblast
- Kamianka, Berezna settlement hromada, in Chernihiv Raion of Chernihiv Oblast
- Kamianka, Ripky settlement hromada, in Chernihiv Raion of Chernihiv Oblast

==== Other populated places ====
- Kamianka, Horlivka Raion, Donetsk Oblast
- Kamianka, Ivano-Frankivsk Oblast
- Kamianka, Izium Raion, Kharkiv Oblast
- Kamianka, Pokrovsk Raion, Donetsk Oblast

=== Other ===
- Kamianka (Bazavluk), a tributary of the Bazavluk in Dnipropetrovsk Oblast
- Kamianka, a research ship of the State Oceanarium, Armed Forces of Ukraine
- Kamianka, a forest reserve of the Synevyr National Park

== Poland ==
- Kamianka, Łosice County in Masovian Voivodeship (east-central Poland)
- Kamianka, Ostrołęka County in Masovian Voivodeship (east-central Poland)
- Kamianka, Gmina Nur, Ostrów County in Masovian Voivodeship (east-central Poland)
- Kamianka, Sokołów County in Masovian Voivodeship (east-central Poland)

== See also ==
- Kamianka Sich
- Nova Kamianka
- Kamenka (disambiguation)
- Kamienka (disambiguation)
- Kamionka (disambiguation)
- Kamianske (disambiguation)
- Kałamanka, a tributary of the Bug river
