= Adolfin =

Adolfin may refer to:

- Adolfin, Lublin Voivodeship
- Adolfin, Masovian Voivodeship
