= Marszewo =

Marszewo may refer to the following places:

- Marszewo, Konin County in Greater Poland Voivodeship (west-central Poland)
- Marszewo, Nowy Tomyśl County in Greater Poland Voivodeship (west-central Poland)
- Marszewo, Śrem County in Greater Poland Voivodeship (west-central Poland)
- Marszewo, Pomeranian Voivodeship (north Poland)
- Marszewo, Warmian-Masurian Voivodeship (north Poland)
- Marszewo, Goleniów County in West Pomeranian Voivodeship (north-west Poland)
- Marszewo, Sławno County in West Pomeranian Voivodeship (north-west Poland)
