= Roztoka =

Roztoka may refer to:

- Roztoka, Subcarpathian Voivodeship (south-east Poland)
- Roztoka, Lower Silesian Voivodeship (south-west Poland)
- Roztoka, Lublin Voivodeship (east Poland)
- Roztoka, Limanowa County in Lesser Poland Voivodeship (south Poland)
- Roztoka, Nowy Sącz County in Lesser Poland Voivodeship (south Poland)
- Roztoka, Tarnów County in Lesser Poland Voivodeship (south Poland)
- Roztoka, Masovian Voivodeship (east-central Poland)
- Roztoka, Greater Poland Voivodeship (west-central Poland)
- Roztoka, Pomeranian Voivodeship (north Poland)
