= Stogi =

Stogi may refer to the following places in Poland:

- Stogi, Lower Silesian Voivodeship (south-west Poland)
- Stogi, Greater Poland Voivodeship (west-central Poland)
- Stogi, Pomeranian Voivodeship (north Poland)
- Stogi, Gdańsk (north Poland)
