= Sławoszewo =

Sławoszewo may refer to the following places:

- Sławoszewo, Greater Poland Voivodeship (west-central Poland)
- Sławoszewo, Kuyavian-Pomeranian Voivodeship (north-central Poland)
- Sławoszewo, West Pomeranian Voivodeship (north-west Poland)
