= Maria Wnęk =

Polish painter

- Born: 16 June 1922; Olszanka
- Died: 12 April 2005 (aged 82); Olszanka
- Known for: painting
- Style: Art Brut

Maria Wnęk (16 June 1922 - 12 April 2005) was one of the most eminent representatives of Outsider art (Art Brut) in Poland.

== Life and work ==
Born in Olszanka near Nowy Sącz to a family of farmers, she finished her formal education after four years of primary school. After her house burned down, she left to Nowy Sącz where she worked as a cleaner and met the painter Ewa Harsdorf who taught her basic of art techniques. She was a fervent believer participating in worship rituals, had visions, heard warnings and admonitions from God and saints, which she later wrote on the reverse sides of her works. Eventually diagnosed with schizophrenia, she spent many years in the Psychiatric Hospital in Kobierzyn.

Her paintings are considered expressive, imaginative and coloristically excellent by collectors and can be found in the American Visionary Art Museum in Baltimore, the Art & Marges Museum in Brussels and the Collection de l'art brut in Lausanne as well as in Polish ethnographic and regional museums and private collections.

Art critic Aleksander Jackowski wrote about her:

Maria Wnęk's works take us into the world of religious epiphanies, but also of images that express the author's fears and obsessions.(...) The wrongs grow in her imagination and it is difficult to discent what really happened and what is a product of fear, and obsession, persecution complex. Simulultaneosly she lives in the world of illusions, beautiful experiences, adding the sacred even to secular motifs. The back of pieces of carton paper are covered with frantic handriting: messages to the world, descripctions of wrongs suffered, legends and catastrophic visions. People wanted her legally incapacitated since people like her, who go their own way, make others feel uncomfortable.
