= Kalinowiec =

Kalinowiec may refer to the following places:

- Kalinowiec, Kuyavian-Pomeranian Voivodeship (north-central Poland)
- Kalinowiec, Maków County in Masovian Voivodeship (east-central Poland)
- Kalinowiec, Węgrów County in Masovian Voivodeship (east-central Poland)
- Kalinowiec, Greater Poland Voivodeship (west-central Poland)
