= Wacław Iwaniuk =

Polish poet, literary critic and essayist

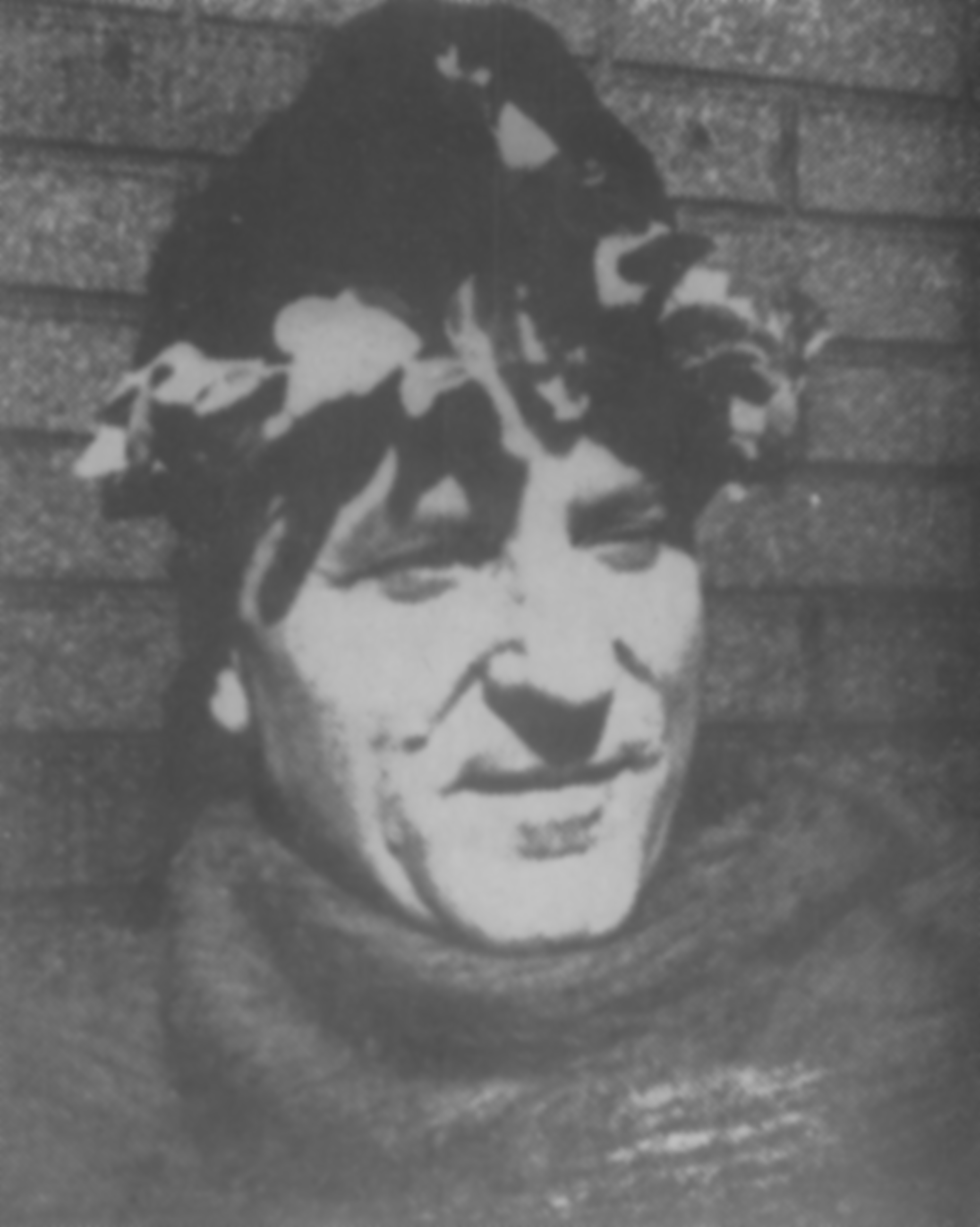
Waclaw Iwaniuk

Wacław Iwaniuk (born 17 December 1912 in Stare Chojno near Chełm Lubelski - died 4 January 2001 in Toronto). Educated in Warsaw and Cambridge, England, a poet, literary critic and essayist for various Polish émigré newspapers in Canada and abroad. He served in the Polish Diplomatic Corps and as an officer in the Polish Armed Forces during World War II. Iwaniuk immigrated to Canada in 1948 (Toronto) where he continued to write and published in Polish. He was a member of several international literary societies (PEN) and writers unions (SPP - Lublin Chapter). During his career as a postwar émigré poet and writer, he had published numerous articles and publications including in popular Polish Kultura paryska.

== Publications ==
- Pełnia czerwca (Poemat). Grupa Literacka "Wołyń", Chełm 1936.
- Dzień apokaliptyczny. (Wiersz). Wydawnictwo F. Hoesick, Warszawa 1938 (arkusz poetycki # 5).
- Czas Din Kichota. Poezje. Wydawnictwo Swiatowego Związku Polaków z Zagranicy, Londyn 1946.
- Dni białe i dni czerwone. Wydawnictwo KLON, Bruksela 1947.
- Szopka polityczna 1952. Konfrateria Artystyczna "Smocza Jama", Toronto 1952
- Pieśń nad pieśniami. Poemat. Oficyna Poetów i Malarzy na Emigracji, Tunbridge Wells 1955 (rusunki Józef Czapski).
- Milczenia. Wiesze 1949 - 1959. Instytut Literacki, Paryż 1959.
- Wybór wierszy. Instytut Literacki, Paryż 1956.
- Ciemny czas. Poezje. Instytut Literacki, Paryż 1968.
- Lustro. Oficyna Malarzy i Poetów, Londyn 1971.
- Nemezis idzie pustymi drogami. Oficyna St. Gliwy, Londyn 1978.
- Dark Times, Hounslow Press, Toronto 1979.
- Evenings on Lake Ontario. From My Canadian Diary. Hounslow Press, Toronto 1981.
- Podróż do Europy.Opowiadania i szkice. Polska Fundacja Kulturalna, Londyn 1982.
- Nocne rozmowy. Wiersze. Polska Fundacja Kulturalna, Londyn 1987.
- Trzy spotkania. "Więź - "Arka" - "Tygodnik Powszechny". Polski Fundusz Wydawniczy w Kanadzie, Toronto 1988.
- Kartagina i inne wiersze. Wolna Spółka Wydawnicza Komitywa (gdzieś w Polsce), 1987 (wydawnictwo niezależe - podziemne).
- Powrót. Biblioteka Więzi, Warszawa 1989.
- Moje obłąkanie (Ma folie). Iwaniuk, Wacław. Lublin, 1991.
- Zanim znikniemy w opactwie kolorów. Wybór wierszy. Wydawnictwo Literackie, Kraków 1991.
- Kilka wierszy. Mordellus Press, Berlin 1993, nakład 5 immiennych egz. Wydanie drugie zmienione Berlin 1994, nakład 12 egz.
- Moje strony świata. Poezje. Iwaniuk, Wacław. Paris, Instytut Literacki-Institut Littéraire, 1994, 76 p. (Biblioteka Kultury, 785).
- Wiersze wybrane. Polski Fundusz Wydawniczy w Kanadzie i Toronto 1995, rysunki Kazimierza Głaza.
- Sceny sądowe czyli nasi w Kanadzie. Polski Fundusz Wydawniczy i Mordellus Press, Toronto - Berlin 11997. Nakład 50 egz. numerowanych.
- W ogrodzie mego ojca. Wiersze z lat 1993-1996. Polski Fundusz Wydawniczy w Kanadzie. Toronto - Toruń 1998.
- Ostatni Romantyk. Wspomnienie o Józefie Lobodowskim. Archiwum Emigracji, Uniwersytet im. M. Kopernika, Toruń 1998.
- Sąd (poemat). Polski Fundusz Wydawniczy w Kanadzie, Berlin - Toronto 1999. Nakład 60 egz. numerowanych.
- Miranda. Fragment wspomnień. Polski Fundusz Wydawniczy w Kanadzie, Berlin - Toronto 2001. Nakład 50 egz. numerowanych.
- Podróż do konsulatu polskiego w Kurytybie" (poem). Iwaniuk, Wacław. Kultura, 7-8, 1994, p. 54.
- Powrót do domu. Iwaniuk, Wacław. Kultura, 3, 1996, p. 37-38.
- Sonet dla Markizy. Iwaniuk, Wacław. Kultura, 1-2, 1998, p. 85.
- Wiersz dla Pawła Mayewskiego, autora «The journey and the pity»"'' (poem). Iwaniuk, Wacław. Kultura, 3, 1993, p. 46.

== See also ==
=== Archives ===
There is a Waclaw Iwaniuk fonds at Library and Archives Canada. The archival reference number is R3980.

== External sources ==
- https://ebsees.staatsbibliothek-berlin.de/simple_search.php?autor=Iwaniuk%2C+Wac%C5%82aw
- http://www.bookrags.com/biography/waclaw-iwaniuk-dlb/
- http://biblioteka.info/archive.htm#5
