= Helenowo =

Helenowo may refer to the following places:

- Helenowo, Inowrocław County in Kuyavian-Pomeranian Voivodeship (north-central Poland)
- Helenowo, Włocławek County in Kuyavian-Pomeranian Voivodeship (north-central Poland)
- Helenowo, Masovian Voivodeship (east-central Poland)
- Helenowo, Gmina Kleczew in Greater Poland Voivodeship (west-central Poland)
- Helenowo, Gmina Wierzbinek in Greater Poland Voivodeship (west-central Poland)
- Helenowo, Pomeranian Voivodeship (north Poland)
- Helenowo, Warmian-Masurian Voivodeship (north Poland)
