= Majdan Zahorodyński =

- Village
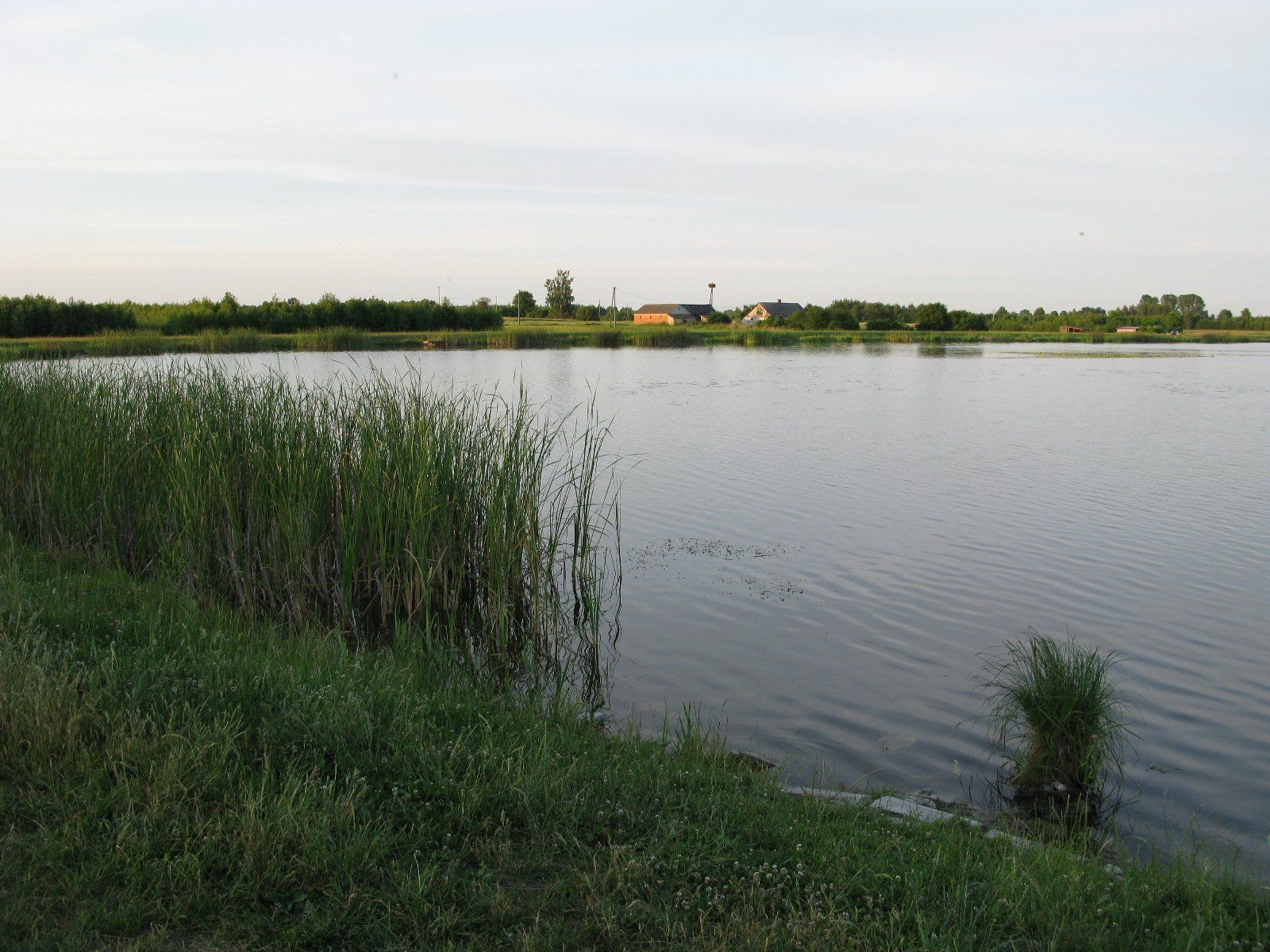
- A lake in Majdan Zahorodyński

- Location within Poland
- Coordinates: 51°13′21″N 23°07′53″E
- Country: Poland
- Voivodeship: Lublin
- County: Chełm
- Gmina: Siedliszcze

Majdan Zahorodyński (Polish pronunciation: [ˈmajdan zaxɔrɔˈdɨj̃skʲi]) is a village in the administrative district of Gmina Siedliszcze, within Chełm County, Lublin Voivodeship, in eastern Poland.
