= Ostrowite, Gmina Pszczółki =

Ostrowite
- Village
- Location within Poland
- Coordinates: 54°12′25″N 18°42′12″E
- Country: Poland
- Voivodeship: Pomeranian
- County: Gdańsk
- Gmina: Pszczółki
- Population: 167

Ostrowite [ɔstrɔˈvitɛ] is a village in the administrative district of Gmina Pszczółki, within Gdańsk County, Pomeranian Voivodeship, in northern Poland.

For details of the history of the region, see History of Pomerania.
