= Stasin Dolny =

- Village
- Location within Poland
- Coordinates: 51°11′9″N 23°8′48″E
- Country: Poland
- Voivodeship: Lublin
- County: Chełm
- Gmina: Siedliszcze

Stasin Dolny [ˈstaɕin ˈdɔlnɨ] is a village in the administrative district of Gmina Siedliszcze, within Chełm County, Lublin Voivodeship, in eastern Poland.
