= Rębielcz =

- Village
- Location within Poland
- Coordinates: 54°9′18″N 18°40′15″E
- Country: Poland
- Voivodeship: Pomeranian
- County: Gdańsk
- Gmina: Pszczółki
- Population: 670

Rębielcz [ˈrɛmbjɛlt͡ʂ] is a village in the administrative district of Gmina Pszczółki, within Gdańsk County, Pomeranian Voivodeship, in northern Poland.

For details of the history of the region, see History of Pomerania.
