= Gliny, Chełm County =

Gliny
- Village
- Location within Poland
- Coordinates: 51°11′37″N 23°07′49″E
- Country: Poland
- Voivodeship: Lublin
- County: Chełm
- Gmina: Siedliszcze

Gliny [ˈɡlinɨ] is a village in the administrative district of Gmina Siedliszcze, within Chełm County, Lublin Voivodeship, in eastern Poland.
