= Spławce =

- Village
- Location within Poland
- Coordinates: 52°24′59″N 18°08′40″E
- Country: Poland
- Voivodeship: Greater Poland
- County: Konin
- Gmina: Kleczew

Spławce [ˈspwaft͡sɛ] is a village in the administrative district of Gmina Kleczew, within Konin County, Greater Poland Voivodeship, in west-central Poland.
