= Nieborzyn, Greater Poland Voivodeship =

Nieborzyn
- Village
- Location within Poland
- Coordinates: 52°25′N 18°6′E
- Country: Poland
- Voivodeship: Greater Poland
- County: Konin
- Gmina: Kleczew
- Population: 530

Nieborzyn [ɲɛˈbɔʐɨn] is a village in the administrative district of Gmina Kleczew, within Konin County, Greater Poland Voivodeship, in west-central Poland.
