= Romanówka, Chełm County =

Romanówka
- Village
- Location within Poland
- Coordinates: 51°11′15″N 23°05′06″E
- Country: Poland
- Voivodeship: Lublin
- County: Chełm
- Gmina: Siedliszcze

Romanówka [rɔmaˈnufka] is a village in the administrative district of Gmina Siedliszcze, within Chełm County, Lublin Voivodeship, in eastern Poland.
