= Józefowo, Gmina Kleczew =

Józefowo
- Village
- Location within Poland
- Coordinates: 52°23′00″N 18°08′10″E
- Country: Poland
- Voivodeship: Greater Poland
- County: Konin
- Gmina: Kleczew

Józefowo (Polish pronunciation: [juzɛˈfɔvɔ]) is a village in the administrative district of Gmina Kleczew, within Konin County, Greater Poland Voivodeship, in west-central Poland.
