= Krowica =

- Village
- Location within Poland
- Coordinates: 51°10′N 23°10′E
- Country: Poland
- Voivodeship: Lublin
- County: Chełm
- Gmina: Siedliszcze

Krowica [krɔˈvit͡sa] is a village in the administrative district of Gmina Siedliszcze, within Chełm County, Lublin Voivodeship, in eastern Poland.
