= Bezek Dębiński =

- Village
- Location within Poland
- Coordinates: 51°11′25″N 23°15′59″E
- Country: Poland
- Voivodeship: Lublin
- County: Chełm
- Gmina: Siedliszcze

Bezek Dębiński [ˈbɛzɛk dɛmˈbiɲski] is a village in the administrative district of Gmina Siedliszcze, within Chełm County, Lublin Voivodeship, in eastern Poland.
