= Słaboludz-Kolonia =

- Village
- Location within Poland
- Coordinates: 52°21′42″N 18°08′55″E
- Country: Poland
- Voivodeship: Greater Poland
- County: Konin
- Gmina: Kleczew

Słaboludz-Kolonia [swaˈbɔlut͡s kɔˈlɔɲa] is a village in the administrative district of Gmina Kleczew, within Konin County, Greater Poland Voivodeship, in west-central Poland.
