= Białogród-Folwark =

- Settlement
- Location within Poland
- Coordinates: 52°20′46″N 18°11′11″E
- Country: Poland
- Voivodeship: Greater Poland
- County: Konin
- Gmina: Kleczew

Białogród-Folwark [bjaˈwɔɡrut ˈfɔlvark] is a settlement in the administrative district of Gmina Kleczew, within Konin County, Greater Poland Voivodeship, in west-central Poland.
