= Brzeziny, Chełm County =

Brzeziny
- Village
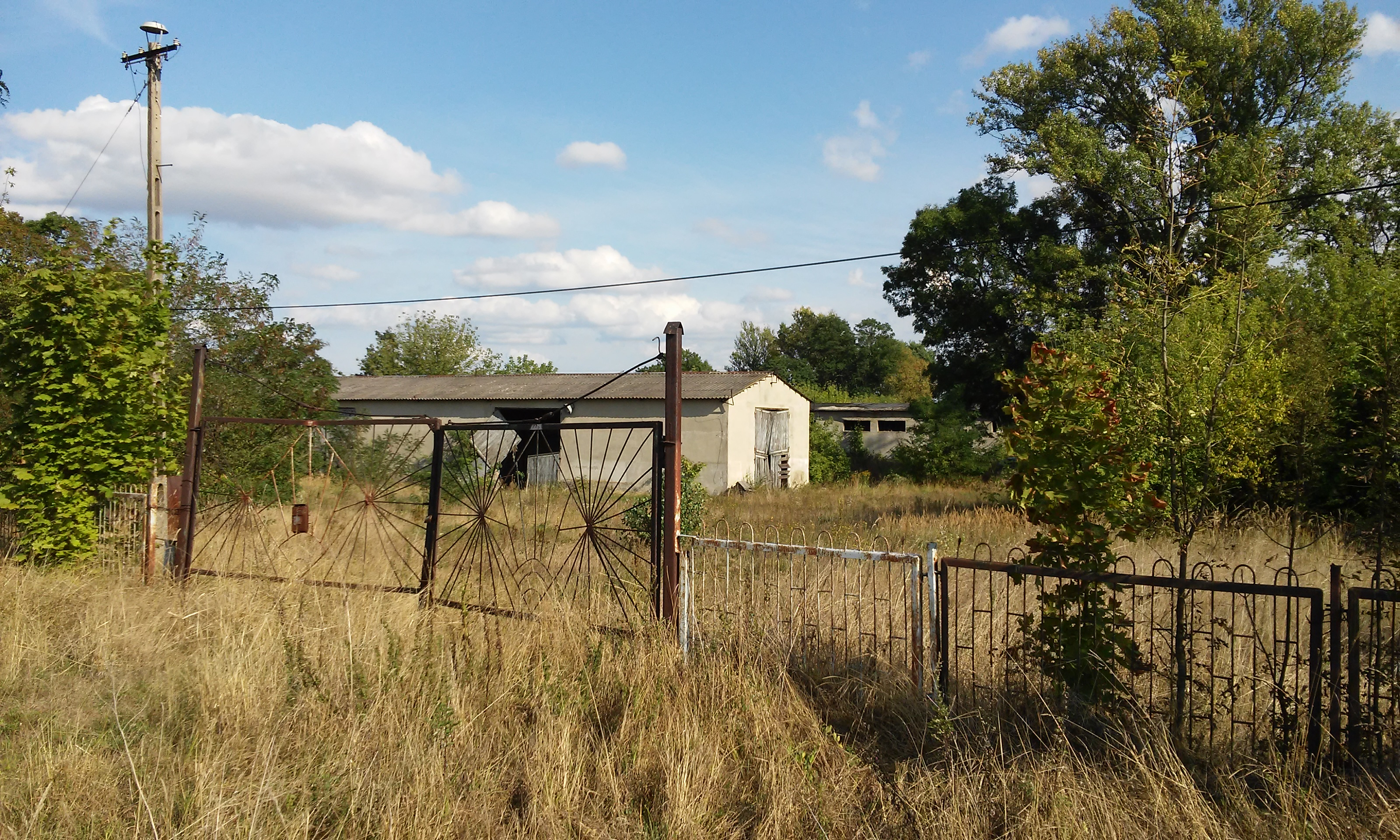
- An abandoned building in Brzeziny

- Location within Poland
- Coordinates: 51°12′11″N 23°12′10″E
- Country: Poland
- Voivodeship: Lublin
- County: Chełm
- Gmina: Siedliszcze
- Time zone: UTC+1 (CET)
  - Summer (DST): UTC+2 (CEST)

Brzeziny [bʐɛˈʑinɨ] is a village in the administrative district of Gmina Siedliszcze, within Chełm County, Lublin Voivodeship, in eastern Poland.

== History ==
Two Polish citizens were murdered by Nazi Germany in the village during World War II.
