= Skowarcz-Kolonia =

- Village
- Location within Poland
- Coordinates: 54°11′8″N 18°41′14″E
- Country: Poland
- Voivodeship: Pomeranian
- County: Gdańsk
- Gmina: Pszczółki

Skowarcz-Kolonia [ˈskɔvart͡ʂ kɔˈlɔɲa] is a village in the administrative district of Gmina Pszczółki, within Gdańsk County, Pomeranian Voivodeship, in northern Poland.

For details of the history of the region, see History of Pomerania.
