= Tręby Stare =

- Village
- Location within Poland
- Coordinates: 52°27′N 18°4′E
- Country: Poland
- Voivodeship: Greater Poland
- County: Konin
- Gmina: Kleczew

Tręby Stare [ˈtrɛmbɨ ˈstarɛ] is a village in the administrative district of Gmina Kleczew, within Konin County, Greater Poland Voivodeship, in west-central Poland.
