= Kulik-Kolonia =

- Village
- Location within Poland
- Coordinates: 51°14′36″N 23°11′41″E
- Country: Poland
- Voivodeship: Lublin
- County: Chełm
- Gmina: Siedliszcze

Kulik-Kolonia [ˈkulik kɔˈlɔɲa] is a village in the administrative district of Gmina Siedliszcze, within Chełm County, Lublin Voivodeship, in eastern Poland.
