= Danków, Greater Poland Voivodeship =

Danków
- Village
- Location within Poland
- Coordinates: 52°23′06″N 18°05′47″E
- Country: Poland
- Voivodeship: Greater Poland
- County: Konin
- Gmina: Kleczew

Danków [ˈdankuf] is a village in the administrative district of Gmina Kleczew, within Konin County, Greater Poland Voivodeship, in west-central Poland.
