= Adamowo, Konin County =

Adamowo
- Village
- Location within Poland
- Coordinates: 52°26′47″N 18°2′52″E
- Country: Poland
- Voivodeship: Greater Poland
- County: Konin
- Gmina: Kleczew
- Population: 100

Adamowo [adaˈmɔvɔ] is a village in the administrative district of Gmina Kleczew, within Konin County, Greater Poland Voivodeship, in west-central Poland.
