= Marynin, Gmina Siedliszcze =

Marynin
- Village
- Location within Poland
- Coordinates: 51°10′37″N 23°11′28″E
- Country: Poland
- Voivodeship: Lublin
- County: Chełm
- Gmina: Siedliszcze

Marynin [maˈrɨnin] is a village in the administrative district of Gmina Siedliszcze, within Chełm County, Lublin Voivodeship, in eastern Poland.
