= Zberzynek =

- Village
- Location within Poland
- Coordinates: 52°26′N 18°7′E
- Country: Poland
- Voivodeship: Greater Poland
- County: Konin
- Gmina: Kleczew

Zberzynek [zbɛˈʐɨnɛk] is a village in the administrative district of Gmina Kleczew, within Konin County, Greater Poland Voivodeship, in west-central Poland.
