= Mogilnica =

- Village
- Location within Poland
- Coordinates: 51°12′N 23°13′E
- Country: Poland
- Voivodeship: Lublin
- County: Chełm
- Gmina: Siedliszcze

Mogilnica [mɔɡilˈnit͡sa] is a village in the administrative district of Gmina Siedliszcze, within Chełm County, Lublin Voivodeship, in eastern Poland.
