= Genowefa, Gmina Kleczew =

Genowefa
- Village
- Location within Poland
- Coordinates: 52°22′28″N 18°13′48″E
- Country: Poland
- Voivodeship: Greater Poland
- County: Konin
- Gmina: Kleczew

Genowefa [ɡɛnɔˈvɛfa] is a village in the administrative district of Gmina Kleczew, within Konin County, Greater Poland Voivodeship, in west-central Poland.
