= Kulik, Lublin Voivodeship =

Kulik
- Village
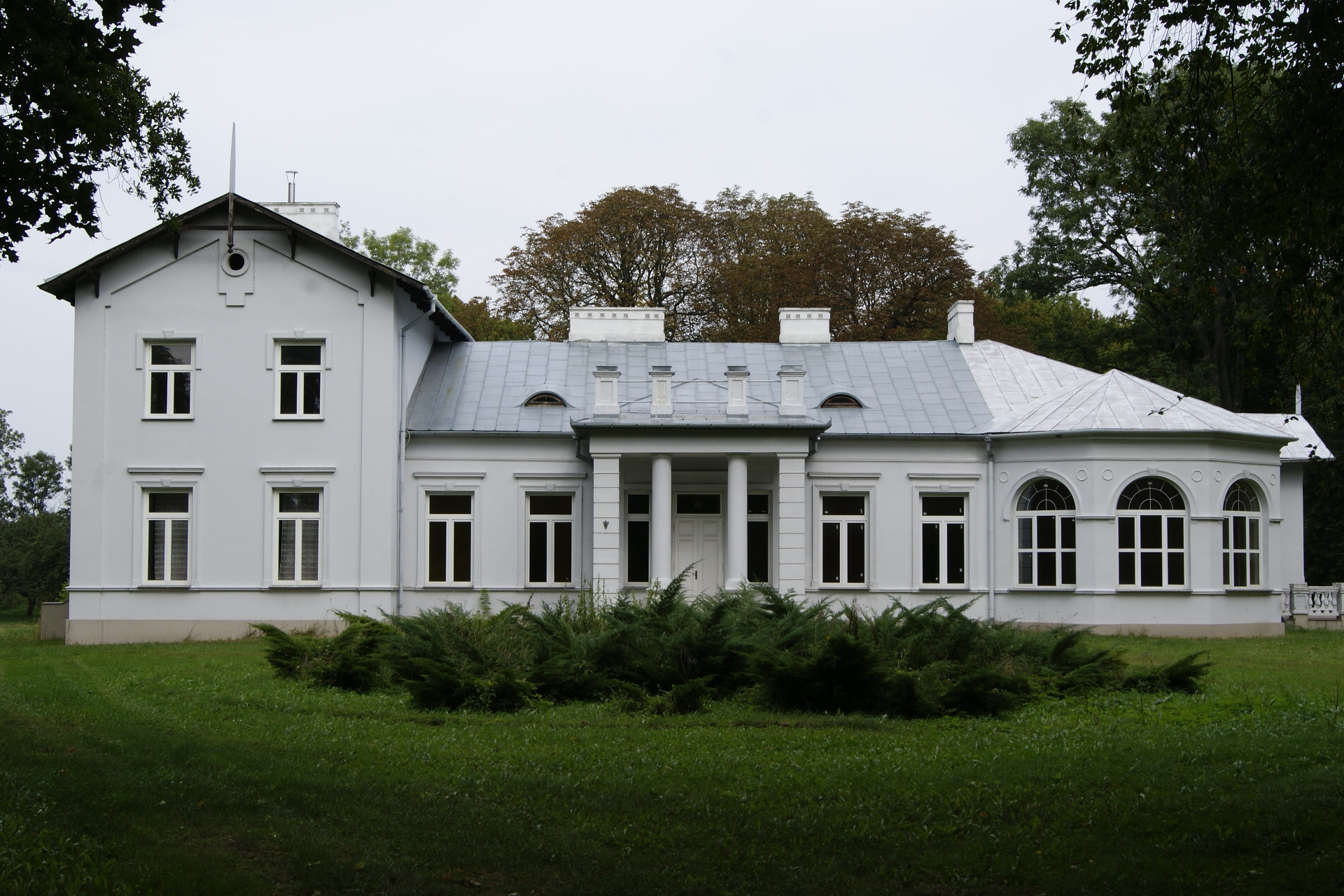
- Old manor in Kulik

- Location within Poland
- Coordinates: 51°15′N 23°11′E
- Country: Poland
- Voivodeship: Lublin
- County: Chełm
- Gmina: Siedliszcze
- Time zone: UTC+1 (CET)
  - Summer (DST): UTC+2 (CEST)
- Vehicle registration: LCH

Kulik [ˈkulik] is a village in the administrative district of Gmina Siedliszcze, within Chełm County, Lublin Voivodeship, in eastern Poland.
