= Żelisławki =

- Village
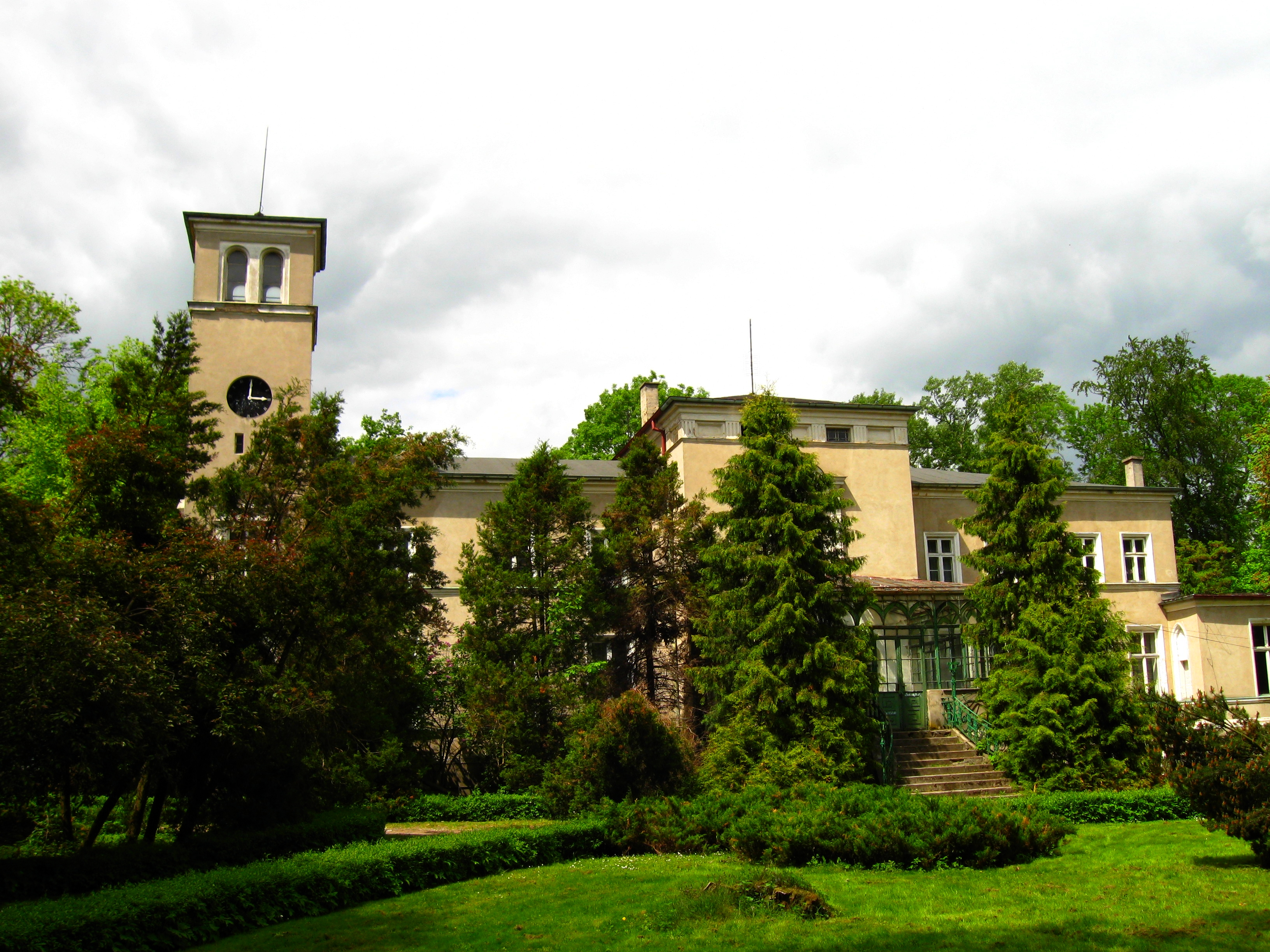
- Palace in the village

- Location within Poland
- Coordinates: 54°9′32″N 18°39′2″E
- Country: Poland
- Voivodeship: Pomeranian
- County: Gdańsk
- Gmina: Pszczółki

Population
  - Total: 499
- Website: http://www.zelislawki.eu

Żelisławki [ʐɛliˈswafki] is a village in the administrative district of Gmina Pszczółki, within Gdańsk County, Pomeranian Voivodeship, in northern Poland.

For details of the history of the region, see History of Pomerania.
