= Bolesławowo, Greater Poland Voivodeship =

Bolesławowo
- Village
- Location within Poland
- Coordinates: 53°25′N 19°11′E
- Country: Poland
- Voivodeship: Greater Poland
- County: Konin
- Gmina: Kleczew

Bolesławowo [bɔlɛswaˈvɔvɔ] is a village in the administrative district of Gmina Kleczew, within Konin County, Greater Poland Voivodeship, in west-central Poland.
