= Cegielnia, Gmina Kleczew =

Cegielnia
- Village
- Location within Poland
- Coordinates: 52°22′3.9″N 18°12′6.1″E
- Country: Poland
- Voivodeship: Greater Poland
- County: Konin
- Gmina: Kleczew

Cegielnia [t͡sɛˈɡʲɛlɲa] is a village in the administrative district of Gmina Kleczew, within Konin County, Greater Poland Voivodeship, in west-central Poland.
