= Budzisław Górny =

- Village
- Location within Poland
- Coordinates: 52°27′N 18°6′E
- Country: Poland
- Voivodeship: Greater Poland
- County: Konin
- Gmina: Kleczew

Budzisław Górny [buˈd͡ʑiswaf ˈɡurnɨ] is a village in the administrative district of Gmina Kleczew, within Konin County, Greater Poland Voivodeship, in west-central Poland.
