= Nowe Chojno =

- Village
- Location within Poland
- Coordinates: 51°10′45″N 23°03′33″E
- Country: Poland
- Voivodeship: Lublin
- County: Chełm
- Gmina: Siedliszcze

Nowe Chojno (Polish pronunciation: [ˈnɔvɛ ˈxɔjnɔ]) is a village in the administrative district of Gmina Siedliszcze, within Chełm County, Lublin Voivodeship, in eastern Poland.
