= Białogród-Kolonia =

- Village
- Location within Poland
- Coordinates: 52°21′17″N 18°11′10″E
- Country: Poland
- Voivodeship: Greater Poland
- County: Konin
- Gmina: Kleczew

Białogród-Kolonia [bjaˈwɔɡrut kɔˈlɔɲa] is a village in the administrative district of Gmina Kleczew, within Konin County, Greater Poland Voivodeship, in west-central Poland.
