= Przytuki =

- Village
- Location within Poland
- Coordinates: 52°21′28″N 18°05′03″E
- Country: Poland
- Voivodeship: Greater Poland
- County: Konin
- Gmina: Kleczew
- Population: 170

Przytuki [pʂɨˈtuki] is a village located in the administrative district of Gmina Kleczew, within Konin County, Greater Poland Voivodeship, in west-central Poland.
