= Kamenka =

Kamenka may refer to:

People

- Eugene Kamenka, Australian philosopher, socialist

Places

- Kamenka Urban Settlement, a municipal formation which the town of district significance of Kamenka in Kamensky District of Penza Oblast, Russia is incorporated as
- Kamenka, Russia, several inhabited localities in Russia
- Kamenka, an alternative name of the town of Taskala, Kazakhstan
- Camenca, capital of the Administrative Region of Camenca of Transnistria
- Kamianka (disambiguation) (Kamenka), several inhabited localities in Ukraine

Rivers

- Kamenka (Ob), a minor tributary of the Ob in Novosibirsk Oblast
- Kamenka (Saint Petersburg), a river in Lakhta-Olgino Municipal Okrug near Saint Petersburg
- Kamenka (Iset), a tributary of the Iset in Sverdlovsk Oblast, Russia
- Kamenka (Nerl), a tributary of the Nerl in Vladimir Oblast, Russia

Other

- Kamenka (island), an island in Lake Peipus-Pihkva (between Estonia and Russia)
- 5385 Kamenka, an asteroid discovered by Lyudmila Chernykh, Soviet astronomer

== See also ==
- Kamensky (disambiguation)
- Kamensk, several inhabited localities in Russia
- Kamienka (disambiguation)
- Kamionka (disambiguation)
