= Cegielnia Łąka =

- Village
- Location within Poland
- Coordinates: 52°23′37″N 18°10′12″E
- Country: Poland
- Voivodeship: Greater Poland
- County: Konin
- Gmina: Kleczew

Cegielnia Łąka [t͡sɛˈɡʲɛlɲa ˈwɔnka] is a village in the administrative district of Gmina Kleczew, within Konin County, Greater Poland Voivodeship, in west-central Poland.
