= Chojeniec-Kolonia =

- Village
- Location within Poland
- Coordinates: 51°11′56″N 23°04′06″E
- Country: Poland
- Voivodeship: Lublin
- County: Chełm
- Gmina: Siedliszcze

Chojeniec-Kolonia [xɔˈjɛɲɛt͡s kɔˈlɔɲa] is a village in the administrative district of Gmina Siedliszcze, within Chełm County, Lublin Voivodeship, in eastern Poland.
