= Kolnik =

- Village
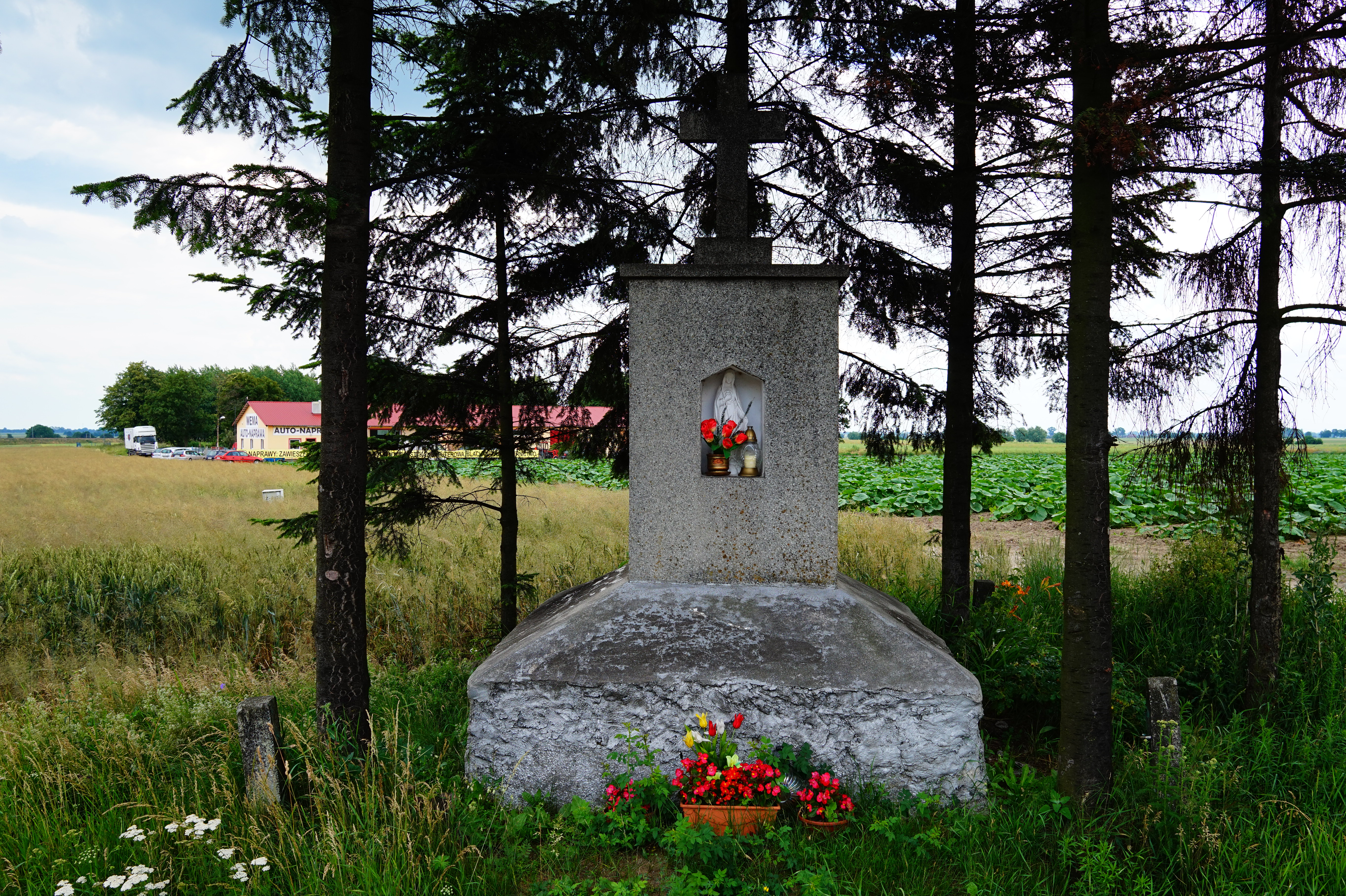
- Wayside shrine in Kolnik

- Location within Poland
- Coordinates: 54°9′19″N 18°42′40″E
- Country: Poland
- Voivodeship: Pomeranian
- County: Gdańsk
- Gmina: Pszczółki
- Population: 503
- Time zone: UTC+1 (CET)
  - Summer (DST): UTC+2 (CEST)
- Vehicle registration: GDA

Kolnik [ˈkɔlnik] is a village in the administrative district of Gmina Pszczółki, within Gdańsk County, Pomeranian Voivodeship, in northern Poland. It is located within historic region of Pomerania.

Kolnik was a private church village of the monastery in Pelplin, administratively located in the Tczew County in the Pomeranian Voivodeship of the Polish Crown.
