= Władysławowo, Gmina Kleczew =

Władysławowo
- Village
- Location within Poland
- Coordinates: 52°22′00″N 18°12′43″E
- Country: Poland
- Voivodeship: Greater Poland
- County: Konin
- Gmina: Kleczew

Władysławowo [vwadɨswaˈvɔvɔ] is a village in the administrative district of Gmina Kleczew, within Konin County, Greater Poland Voivodeship, in west-central Poland.
