= Siedliszcze, Gmina Siedliszcze =

Siedliszcze
- Town
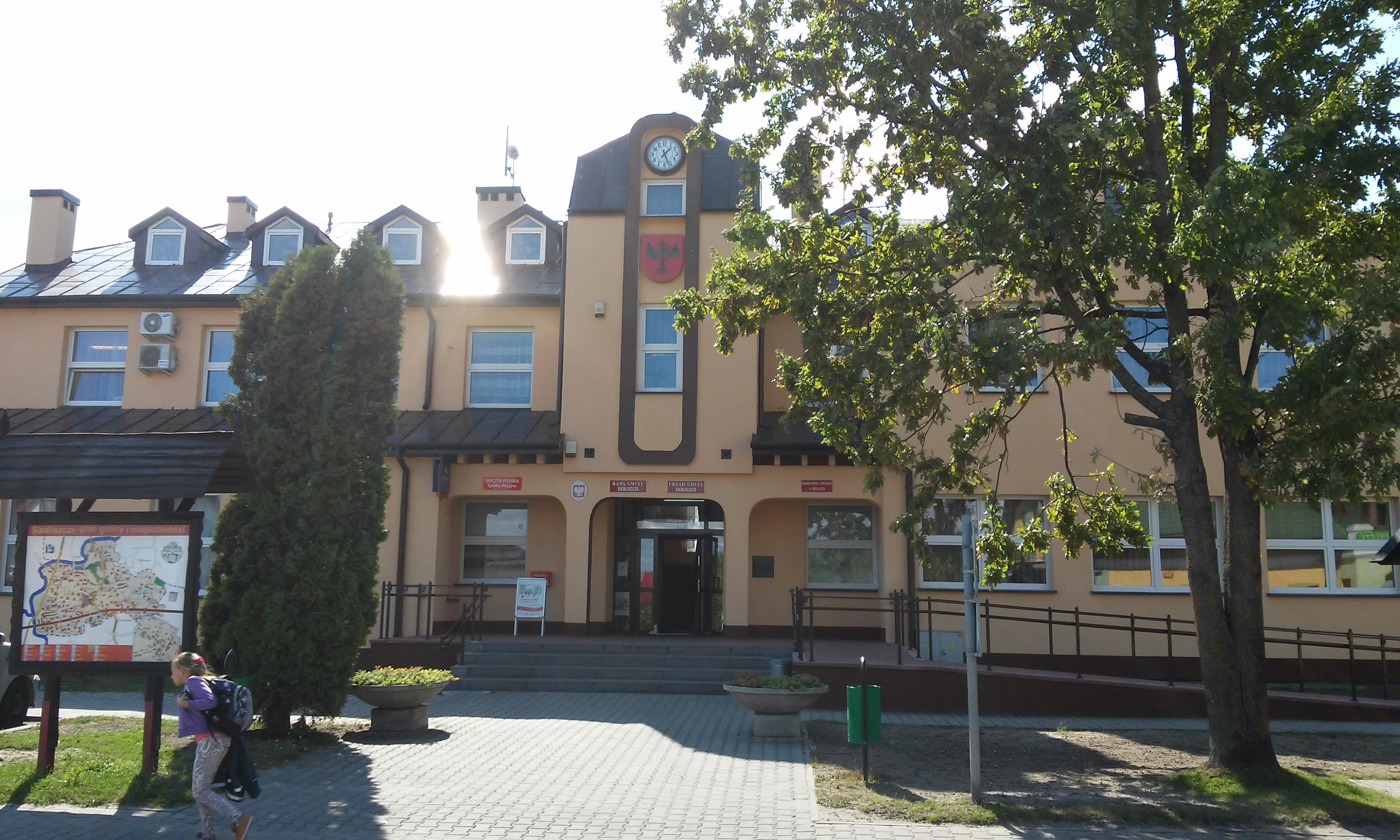
- Town hall

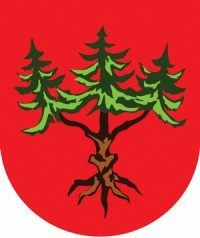
- Coat of arms

- Location within Poland
- Coordinates: 51°11′40″N 23°9′50″E
- Country: Poland
- Voivodeship: Lublin
- County: Chełm
- Gmina: Siedliszcze
- Town rights: 1548

Population
  - Total: 813
- Time zone: UTC+1 (CET)
  - Summer (DST): UTC+2 (CEST)
- Vehicle registration: LCH

Siedliszcze ([ɕɛˈdliʂt͡ʂɛ]) is a town in Chełm County, Lublin Voivodeship, in eastern Poland. It is the seat of the gmina (administrative district) called Gmina Siedliszcze.

The town has a population of 813.

== History ==
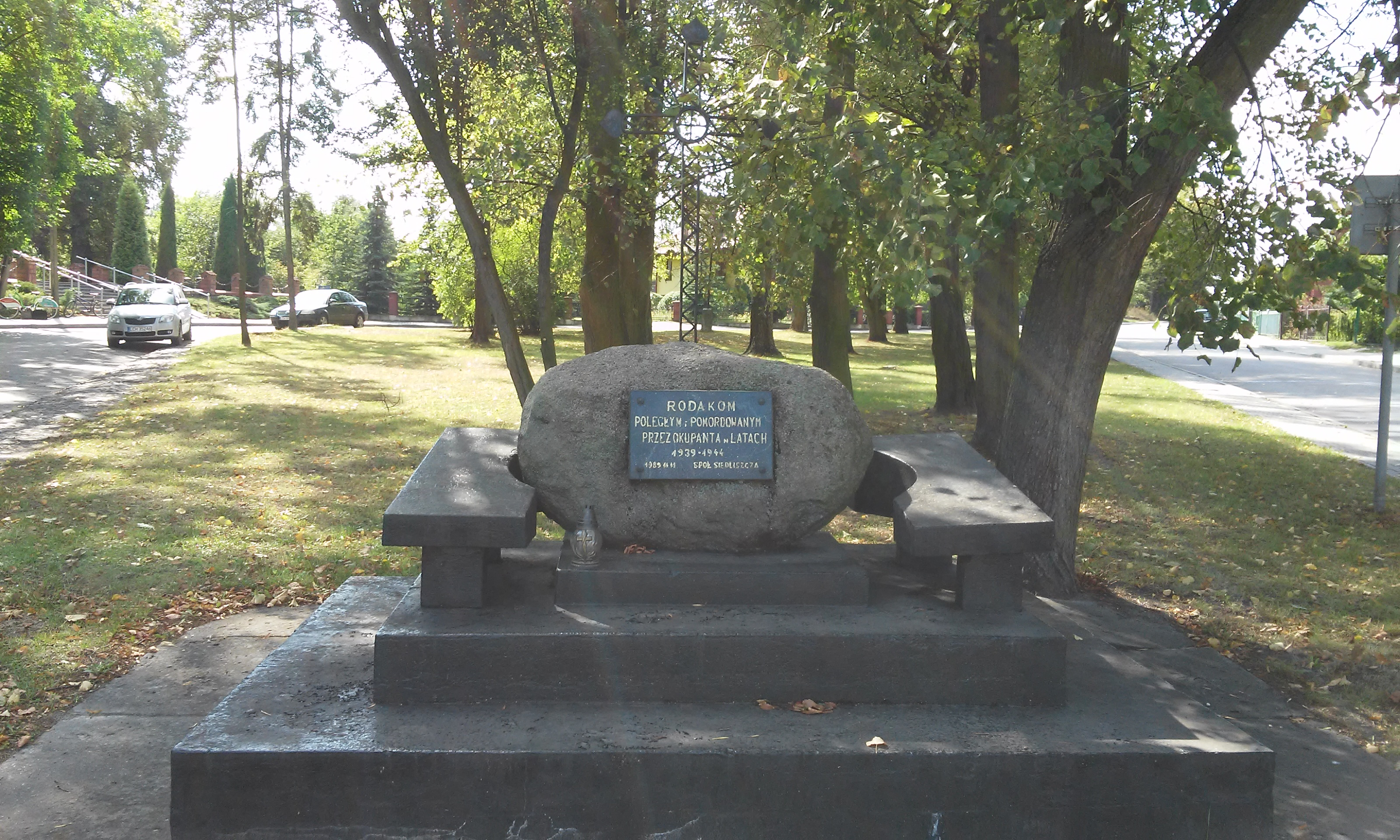
Memorial to victims of German occupation during World War II

Siedliszcze obtained town rights in 1548.

In 1921, there were 666 Jews living in Siedliszcze, representing 80% of the entire village's population.

Following the German-Soviet invasion of Poland, which started World War II in September 1939, the town was occupied by Germany until 1944. On 1 June 1940 the Germans created a ghetto in Siedliszcze for the Jewish population. There were about 2,000 Jews from Siedliszcze, Kraków, Lublin and Czechoslovakia in the ghetto. On 18 May 1942 about 630 Jews were sent to the Sobibor extermination camp. The liquidation of the ghetto took place in October 1942 when the rest of the ghetto inmates were sent to the Sobibor extermination camp. During the entire Nazi occupation, shootings of the Jewish population took place at the Jewish cemetery.
