= Jóźwin, Gmina Kleczew =

Jóźwin
- Settlement
- Location within Poland
- Coordinates: 52°21′19″N 18°12′56″E
- Country: Poland
- Voivodeship: Greater Poland
- County: Konin
- Gmina: Kleczew

Jóźwin [ˈjuʑvin] is a settlement in the administrative district of Gmina Kleczew, within Konin County, Greater Poland Voivodeship, in west-central Poland.
