= Jabłonka, Greater Poland Voivodeship =

Jabłonka
- Village
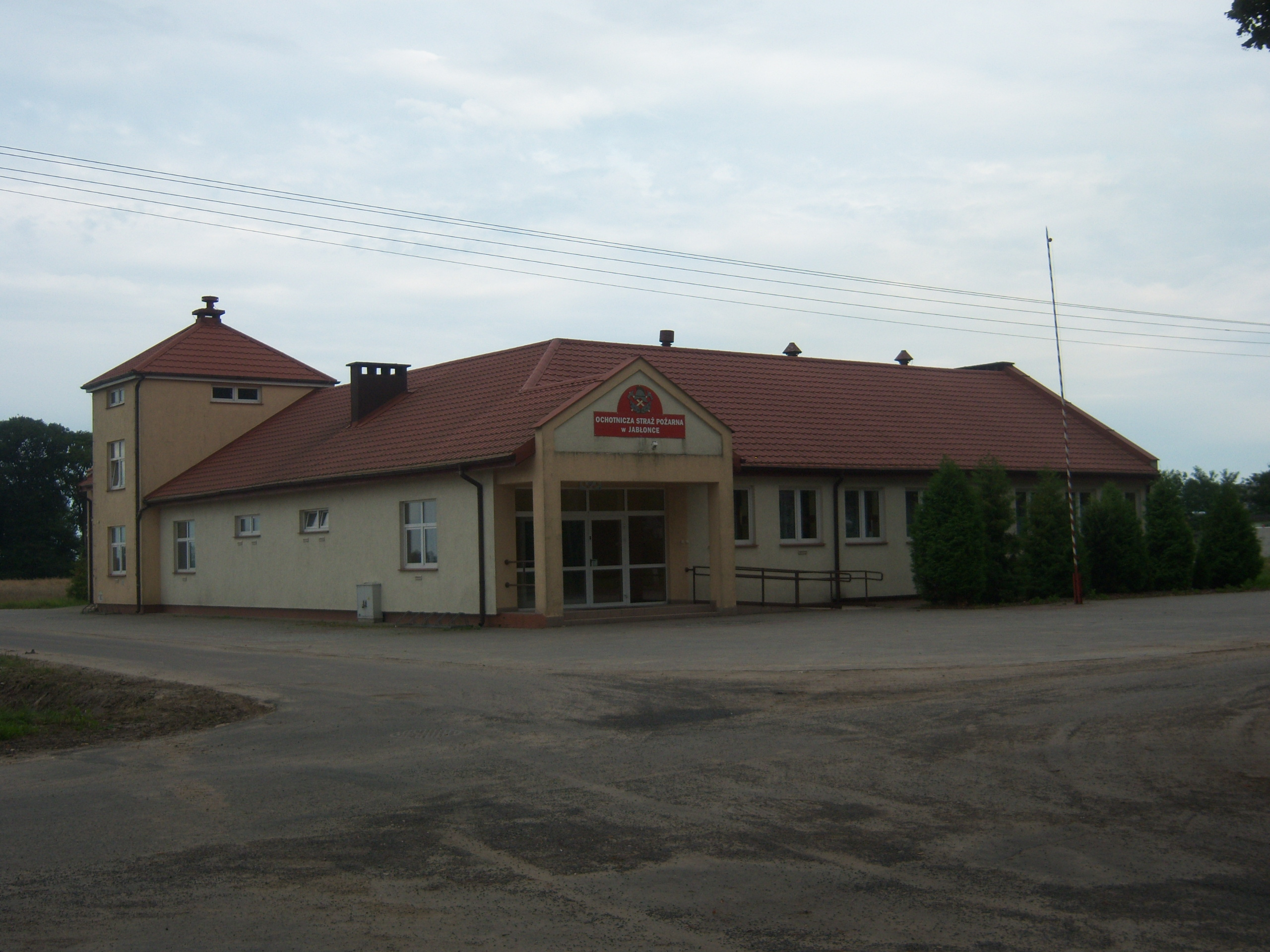
- Fire-station in Jabłonka

- Location within Poland
- Coordinates: 52°21′N 18°6′E
- Country: Poland
- Voivodeship: Greater Poland
- County: Konin
- Gmina: Kleczew
- Population: 350

Jabłonka [jaˈbwɔnka] is a village in the administrative district of Gmina Kleczew, within Konin County, Greater Poland Voivodeship, in west-central Poland.
