= Pszczółki, Pomeranian Voivodeship =

Pszczółki
- Village
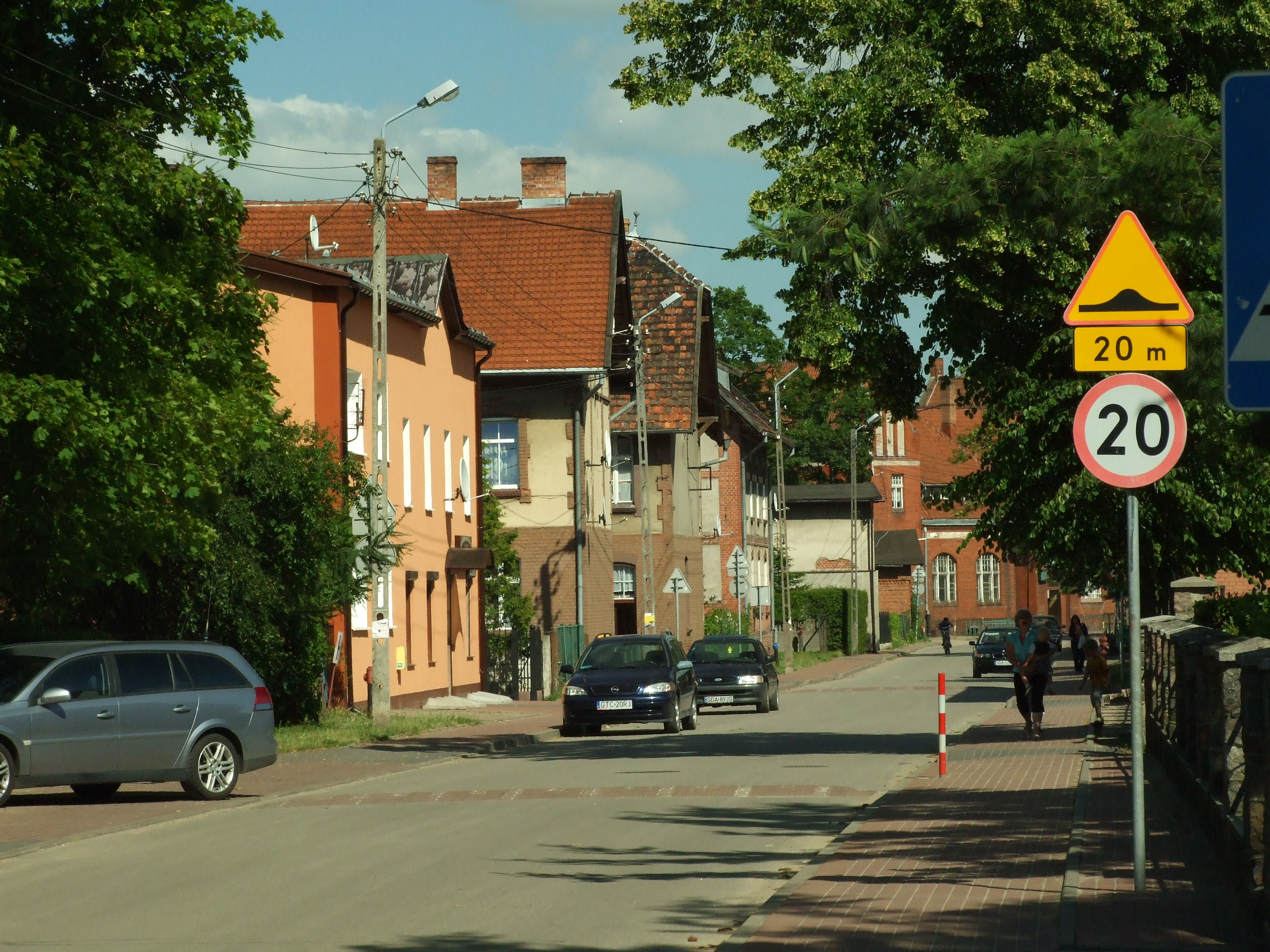
- A street in Pszczółki

- Location within Poland
- Coordinates: 54°10′21″N 18°41′53″E
- Country: Poland
- Voivodeship: Pomeranian
- County: Gdańsk
- Gmina: Pszczółki
- Population: 4,053
- Time zone: UTC+1 (CET)
  - Summer (DST): UTC+2 (CEST)
- Website: http://www.pszczolki.pl/

Pszczółki [ˈpʂt͡ʂuu̯ki] (German: Hohenstein) is a village in Gdańsk County, Pomeranian Voivodeship, in northern Poland. It is the seat of the gmina (administrative district) called Gmina Pszczółki. It is located within the historic region of Pomerania.

== History ==
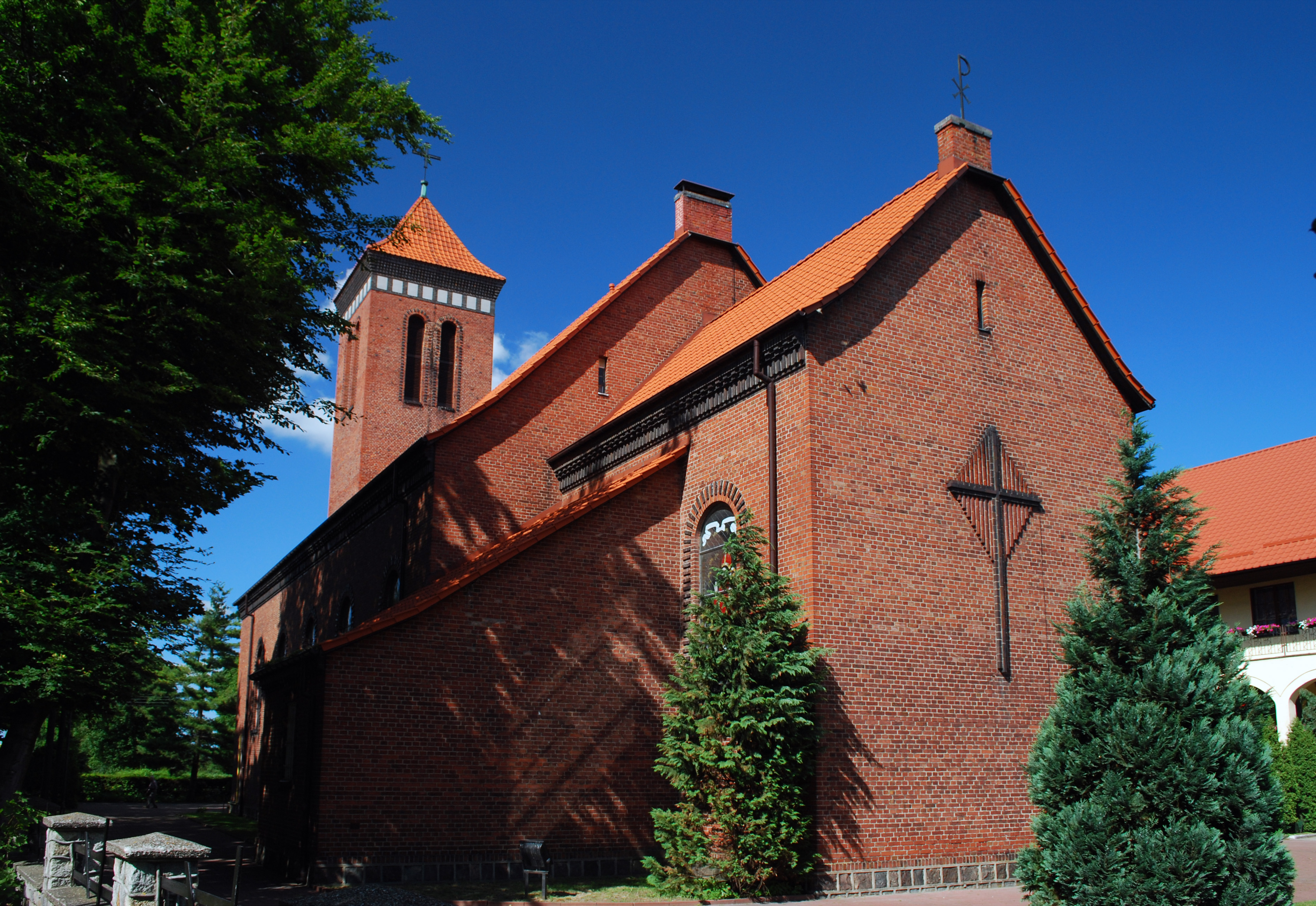
Sacred Heart church

The oldest known mention of the village comes from 1307 under the name Psolcicz. Pszczółki was a royal village of the Polish Crown, administratively located in the Tczew County in the Pomeranian Voivodeship.
