= Gmina Pszczółki =

Gmina Pszczółki Pszczółki Commune
- Gmina
- Coat of arms
- Interactive map of Gmina Pszczółki
- Coordinates (Pszczółki): 54°10′21″N 18°41′53″E
- Country: Poland
- Voivodeship: Pomeranian
- County: Gdańsk
- Seat: Pszczółki

Area
  - Total: 49.84 km^{2} (19.24 sq mi)

Population (2006)
  - Total: 7,912
  - Density: 158.7/km^{2} (411.2/sq mi)
- Website: http://www.pszczolki.pl

Gmina Pszczółki is a rural gmina (administrative district) in Gdańsk County, Pomeranian Voivodeship, in northern Poland. Its seat is the village of Pszczółki, which lies approximately 12 kilometres (7 mi) south of Pruszcz Gdański and 22 km (14 mi) south of the regional capital Gdańsk.

The gmina covers an area of 49.84 square kilometres (19.2 sq mi), and as of 2006 its total population is 7,912.

== Villages ==
Gmina Pszczółki contains the villages and settlements of Kleszczewko, Kolnik, Ostrowite, Pszczółki, Rębielcz, Różyny, Skowarcz, Skowarcz-Kolonia, Ulkowy and Żelisławki.

== Neighbouring gminas ==
Gmina Pszczółki is bordered by the gminas of Pruszcz Gdański, Suchy Dąb, Tczew and Trąbki Wielkie.
