= Janowica, Chełm County =

Janowica
- Village
- Location within Poland
- Coordinates: 51°13′N 23°9′E
- Country: Poland
- Voivodeship: Lublin
- County: Chełm
- Gmina: Siedliszcze

Population (approx.)
  - Total: 170
- Website: http://www.figiel.prv.pl

Janowica ([janɔˈvit͡sa]; Ukrainian: Яновиця) is a village in the administrative district of Gmina Siedliszcze, within Chełm County, Lublin Voivodeship, in eastern Poland.
