= Lipówki, Lublin Voivodeship =

Lipówki
- Village
- Location within Poland
- Coordinates: 51°9′28″N 23°8′29″E
- Country: Poland
- Voivodeship: Lublin
- County: Chełm
- Gmina: Siedliszcze

Lipówki [liˈpufki] is a village in the administrative district of Gmina Siedliszcze, within Chełm County, Lublin Voivodeship, in eastern Poland.
