= Gmina Kleczew =

Gmina Kleczew Kleczew Commune
- Gmina
- Coat of arms

- Coordinates (Kleczew): 52°22′16″N 18°10′35″E
- Country: Poland
- Voivodeship: Greater Poland
- County: Konin County
- Seat: Kleczew

Area
  - Total: 110.12 km^{2} (42.52 sq mi)

Population (2006)
  - Total: 9,721
  - Density: 88.28/km^{2} (228.6/sq mi)
  - Urban: 4,173
  - Rural: 5,548
- Website: http://www.kleczew.pl/index.jsp

Gmina Kleczew is an urban-rural gmina (administrative district) in Konin County, Greater Poland Voivodeship, in west-central Poland. Its seat is the town of Kleczew, which lies approximately 19 kilometres (12 mi) north of Konin and 86 km (53 mi) east of the regional capital Poznań.

The gmina covers an area of 110.12 square kilometres (42.5 sq mi), and as of 2006 its total population is 9,721 (out of which the population of Kleczew amounts to 4,173, and the population of the rural part of the gmina is 5,548).

== Villages ==
Apart from the town of Kleczew, Gmina Kleczew contains the villages and settlements of Adamowo, Alinowo, Białogród-Folwark, Białogród-Kolonia, Bolesławowo, Budy, Budzisław Górny, Budzisław Kościelny, Cegielnia, Cegielnia Łąka, Danków, Danków A, Dobromyśl, Genowefa, Helenowo, Izabelin, Jabłonka, Janowo, Józefowo, Jóźwin, Kalinowiec, Kamionka, Koziegłowy, Marszewo, Miłaczew, Modrzerzewo, Nieborzyn, Obrona, Przytuki, Roztoka, Słaboludź, Słaboludz-Kolonia, Sławoszewek, Sławoszewo, Słowiki, Spławce, Stogi, Tręby Stare, Wielkopole, Władysławowo, Wola Spławiecka, Zberzyn, Zberzynek and Złotków.

== Neighbouring gminas ==
Gmina Kleczew is bordered by the gminas of Kazimierz Biskupi, Orchowo, Ostrowite, Powidz, Ślesin and Wilczyn.
