= Kamienka =

Kamienka may refer to:

- Kamienka, Humenné District, Slovakia
- Kamienka, Stará Ľubovňa District, Slovakia

== See also ==
- Kamenka (disambiguation)
- Kamianka (disambiguation)
- Kamionka (disambiguation)
