= Chojeniec =

Chojeniec, Poland
- Village
- Location within Poland
- Coordinates: 51°12′N 23°6′E
- Country: Poland
- Voivodeship: Lublin
- County: Chełm
- Gmina: Siedliszcze

Population
  - Total: 340

Chojeniec [xɔˈjɛɲɛt͡s] is a village in the administrative district of Gmina Siedliszcze, within Chełm County, Lublin Voivodeship, in eastern Poland.
