= Jankowice, Lublin Voivodeship =

Jankowice
- Village
- Location within Poland
- Coordinates: 51°10′N 23°18′E
- Country: Poland
- Voivodeship: Lublin
- County: Chełm
- Gmina: Siedliszcze

Jankowice [jankɔˈvit͡sɛ] is a village in the administrative district of Gmina Siedliszcze, within Chełm County, Lublin Voivodeship, in eastern Poland.
