= Siedliszcze-Osada =

- Village
- Location within Poland
- Coordinates: 51°11′36″N 23°09′15″E
- Country: Poland
- Voivodeship: Lublin
- County: Chełm
- Gmina: Siedliszcze

Population
  - Total: 335

Siedliszcze-Osada [ɕɛdˈliʂt͡ʂɛ ɔˈsada] is a village in the administrative district of Gmina Siedliszcze, within Chełm County, Lublin Voivodeship, in eastern Poland.
