= Wojciechów, Chełm County =

Wojciechów
- Village
- Location within Poland
- Coordinates: 51°10′22″N 23°3′27″E
- Country: Poland
- Voivodeship: Lublin
- County: Chełm
- Gmina: Siedliszcze

Wojciechów (Polish pronunciation: [vɔjˈt͡ɕɛxuf]) is a village in the administrative district of Gmina Siedliszcze, within Chełm County, Lublin Voivodeship, in eastern Poland.
