= Stare Chojno =

- Village
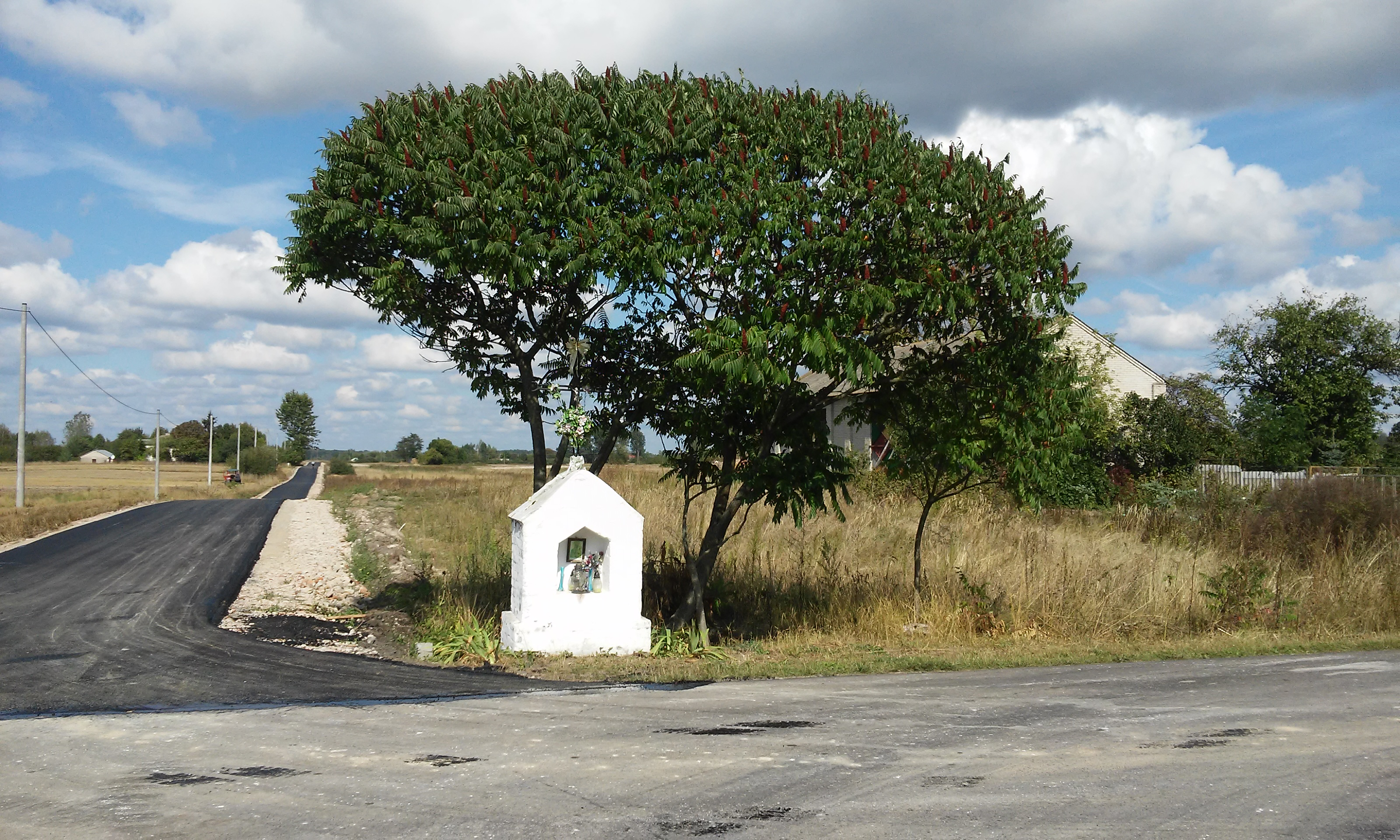

- Location within Poland
- Coordinates: 51°11′07″N 23°06′48″E
- Country: Poland
- Voivodeship: Lublin
- County: Chełm
- Gmina: Siedliszcze

Stare Chozno (Polish pronunciation: [ˈstarɛ ˈxɔjnɔ]) is a village in the administrative district of Gmina Siedliszcze, within Chełm County, Lublin Voivodeship, in eastern Poland.
