= Gmina Siedliszcze =

Gmina Siedliszcze Siedliszcze Commune
- Gmina
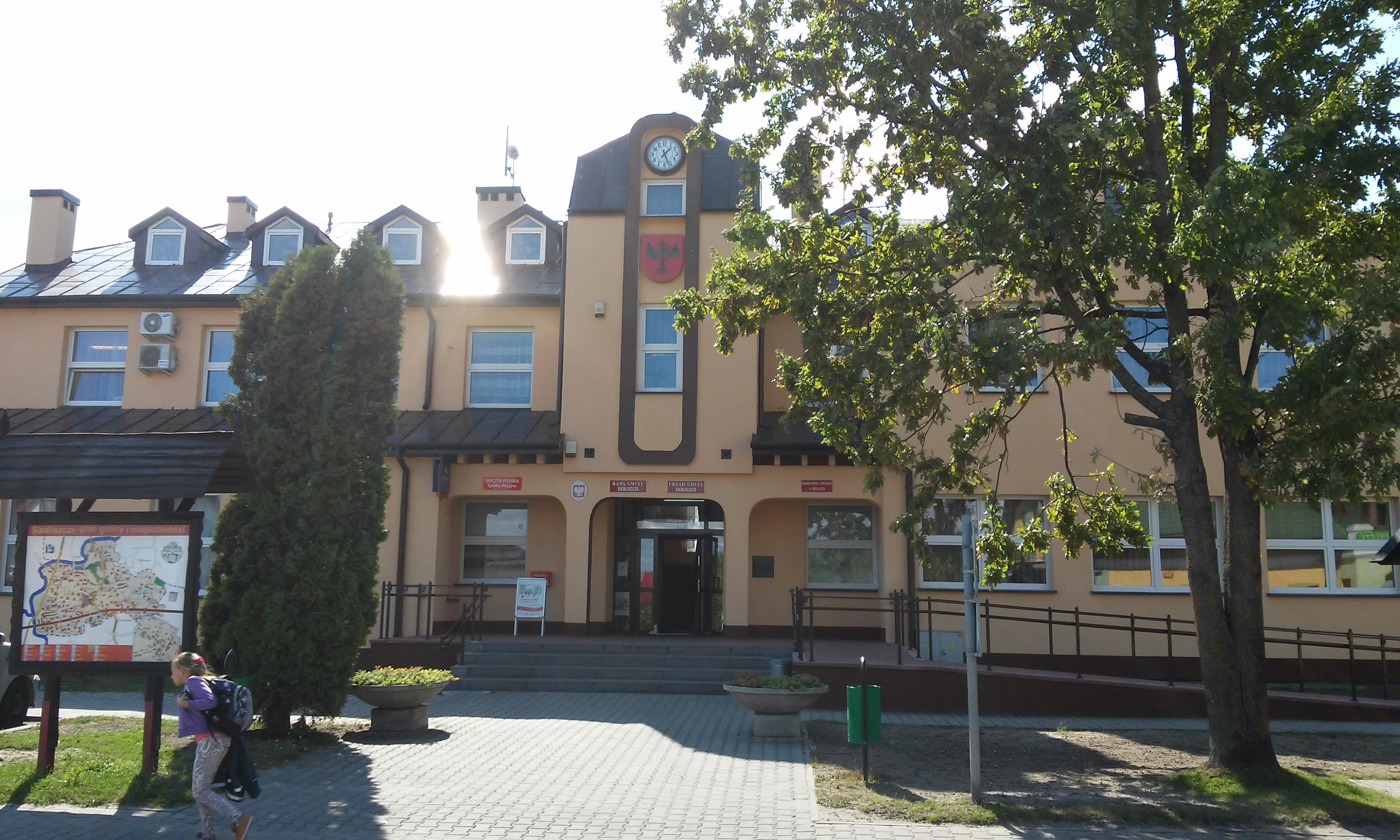

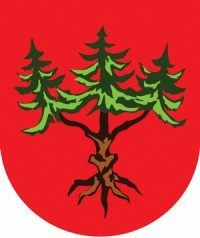
- Coat of arms

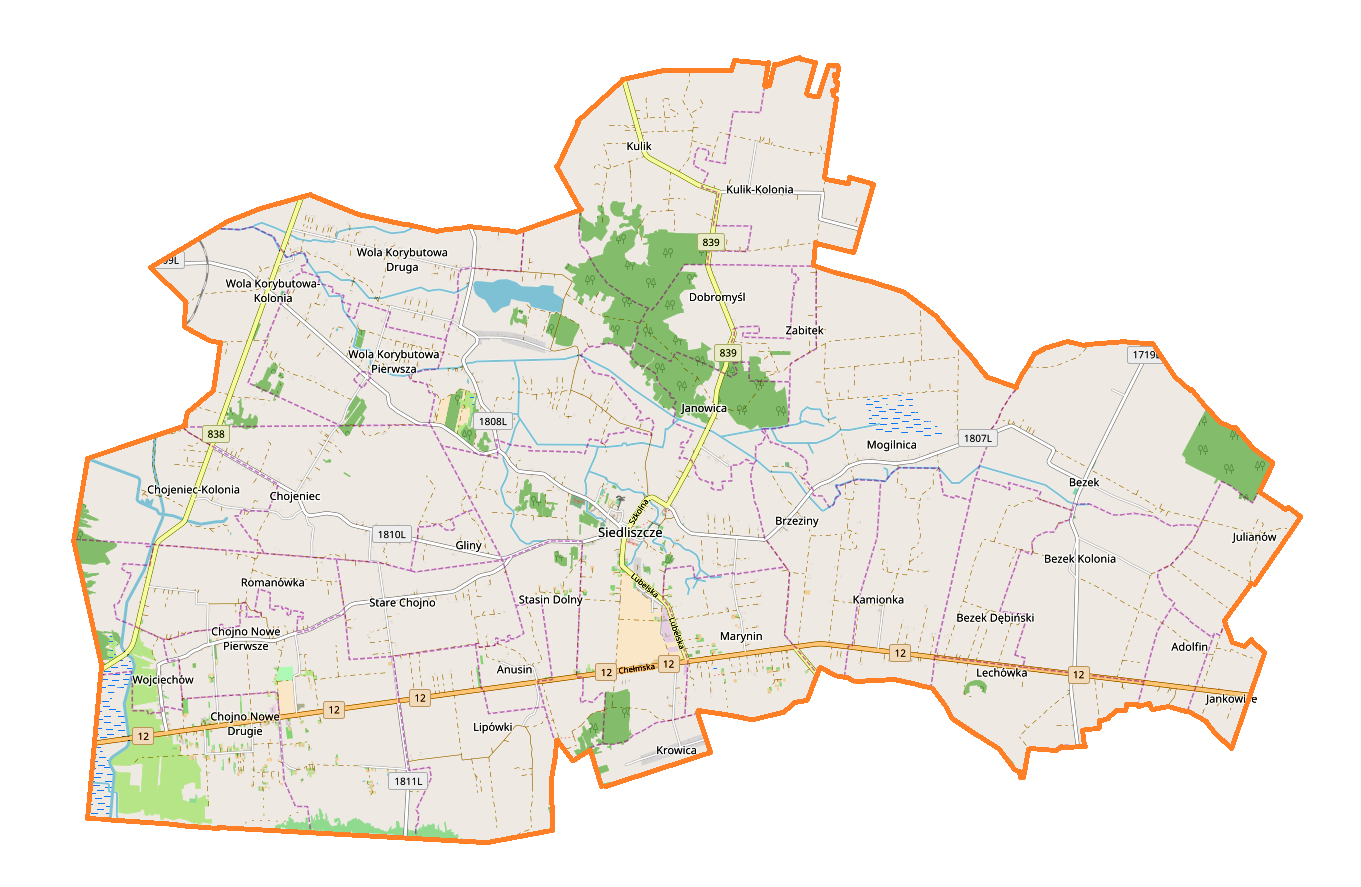
- Coordinates (Siedliszcze): 51°11′40″N 23°9′50″E
- Country: Poland
- Voivodeship: Lublin
- County: Chełm County
- Seat: Siedliszcze

Area
  - Total: 153.9 km^{2} (59.4 sq mi)

Population (2006)
  - Total: 7,050
  - Density: 45.8/km^{2} (119/sq mi)
- Website: http://www.siedliszcze.pl

Gmina Siedliszcze is a rural gmina (administrative district) in Chełm County, Lublin Voivodeship, in eastern Poland. Its seat is the village of Siedliszcze, which lies approximately 23 kilometres (14 mi) west of Chełm and 42 km (26 mi) east of the regional capital Lublin.

The gmina covers an area of 153.9 square kilometres (59.4 sq mi), and as of 2006 its total population is 7,050.

== Villages ==
Gmina Siedliszcze contains the villages and settlements of:

- Adolfin
- Anusin
- Bezek
- Bezek Dębiński
- Bezek-Kolonia
- Borowo
- Brzeziny
- Chojeniec
- Chojeniec-Kolonia
- Dobromyśl
- Gliny
- Jankowice
- Janowica
- Julianów
- Kamionka
- Krowica
- Kulik
- Kulik-Kolonia
- Lechówka
- Lipówki
- Majdan Zahorodyński
- Marynin
- Mogilnica
- Nowe Chojno
- Romanówka
- Siedliszcze
- Siedliszcze-Kolonia
- Siedliszcze-Osada
- Stare Chojno
- Stasin Dolny,
- Wojciechów
- Wola Korybutowa Druga
- Wola Korybutowa Pierwsza
- Wola Korybutowa-Kolonia
- Zabitek

== Neighbouring gminas ==
Gmina Siedliszcze is bordered by the gminas of Chełm, Cyców, Milejów, Puchaczów, Rejowiec Fabryczny, Trawniki and Wierzbica.
