= Chernihiv Regional Psychoneurological Hospital =

Psychiatric institution in Ukraine

Geography
- Location: Basis: complex No. 1 -Postal code 14005, Ivan Mazepa Street, 3,Chernihiv city, complex No. 2 - near the village of Khalyavin, Chernihiv District, Chernihiv Oblast, Ukraine, Chernihiv Raion and city Chernihiv, Chernihiv Oblast, Ukraine

Organisation
- Care system: State property and communal institution for the provision of medical and, mainly, psychiatric care
- Type: Specialist ( mainly psychiatrists/psychotherapists/clinical psychologists )

Services
- Standards: Ukraine
- Emergency department: Yes ( only psychiatric help )

History
- Opened: 1802 year

Links
- Website: https://chopnl.com.ua/
- Other links: List of hospitals in Ukraine

The Chernihiv Regional Psychoneurological Hospital is a psychiatric institution in the Chernihiv region. It is subordinate to the Chernihiv Department of Health Protection Chernihiv Regional State Administration. Territorially, the hospital is located in 2 places – in Chernihiv at 3 Mazepy Street and near the village of Khalyavin (4 km of the Gomel highway). On the territory of the hospital near Halyavin, where most of the patients are accommodated (780 beds), there are also: a chapel, a bank branch, a pharmacy and a shop.
