= Kamionka, Konin County =

Kamionka
- Village
- Location within Poland
- Coordinates: 52°24′N 18°5′E
- Country: Poland
- Voivodeship: Greater Poland
- County: Konin
- Gmina: Kleczew
- Population: 210

Kamionka [kaˈmjɔnka] is a village in the administrative district of Gmina Kleczew, within Konin County, Greater Poland Voivodeship, in west-central Poland.
