= Mirosław Śledź =

Polish painter

- Born: 16 June 1961 (age 65); Gdynia, Poland
- Known for: Painting
- Movement: Art brut
- Awards: Award of the President of Gdynia (2026)
- Website: Official website

Mirosław Śledź (born 16 June 1961), commonly known as Mirek Śledź, is a Polish painter based in Gdynia, Poland best known for his Cubism-inspired style he coined as “quadrism”.

== Life ==
Mirosław Śledź was born in the Polish city of Gdynia during the period of the Polish People's Republic.

He began painting at the age of 30 in 1991.

Śledź worked in a clothing factory producing army uniforms where he fell in love with a coworker who did not reciprocate his feelings. Using his despondent emotions, Śledź began to paint two to three paintings a day. Seeking training and a community, he became a member of the Gdynia Art Lovers’ Club.

Śledź is partially deaf.

In 2026, Śledź received the Award of the President of Gdynia for his contribution to the cultural heritage of the city.

== Style ==
Śledź's main medium is oil painting.

Inspired by Picasso and Cubism, Śledź began painting only using squares and cubic geometric patterns in a style he called “quadrism”. By 1993, he was exhibiting his work at the Gdynia Art Lovers’ Club. In 1994, he held a solo exhibition at the Art et Marges Museum in Brussels where he broke the gallery's sales record by selling seven works. The Brussels exhibition firmly classified him as part of the art brut movement.

After the exhibitions, Śledź became burnt out from quadrism and began to incorporate metaphysical painting and numerology into his works while retaining his emblematic geometric simplicity. Each new painting incorporates a pattern of three-dimensional letters featured on both the front and back and is numbered sequentially.

Śledź claims to force himself to paint at least one new piece a day, calling it an addiction. A 2026 conservative estimate of his total works put it at over 3,500, however Śledź claims a corpus of over 10,000 works. As a result of this throughput, his work ranges in theme from the aftermath of World War II in Poland to the daily and mundane. Śledź is likened to Nikifor for his naïve style and large oeuvre.

Śledź has participated in over 200 exhibitions including in Brussels, Kyoto, Yokohama, Biarritz, Bordeaux, Chicago, Munich, Venice, Liège, Cologne, Kraków, and Druskininkai, but is most often exhibited in his home region of the Tricity.
