= Kamionka, Chełm County =

Kamionka
- Village
- Location within Poland
- Coordinates: 51°11′02″N 23°13′04″E
- Country: Poland
- Voivodeship: Lublin
- County: Chełm
- Gmina: Siedliszcze

Kamionka [kaˈmjɔnka] is a village in the administrative district of Gmina Siedliszcze, within Chełm County, Lublin Voivodeship, in eastern Poland.
