= Kamianske (disambiguation) =

Kamianske is a city in Dnipropetrovsk Oblast, Ukraine. Kamianske (Ukrainian: Кам'янське, pronounced [kɐmjɐnʲˈsʲkɛ]) may also refer to several other localities in Ukraine:

- Kamianske, Zakarpattia Oblast
- Kamianske, Vasylivka Raion, Zaporizhzhia Oblast
