= Adolfin, Lublin Voivodeship =

Adolfin
- Village
- Location within Poland
- Coordinates: 51°10′52″N 23°17′50″E
- Country: Poland
- Voivodeship: Lublin
- County: Chełm
- Gmina: Siedliszcze

Adolfin [aˈdɔlfin] is a village in the administrative district of Gmina Siedliszcze, within Chełm County, Lublin Voivodeship, in eastern Poland.
