= Góra, Kościerzyna County =

Village in Pomeranian Voivodeship, Poland

Góra
- Village
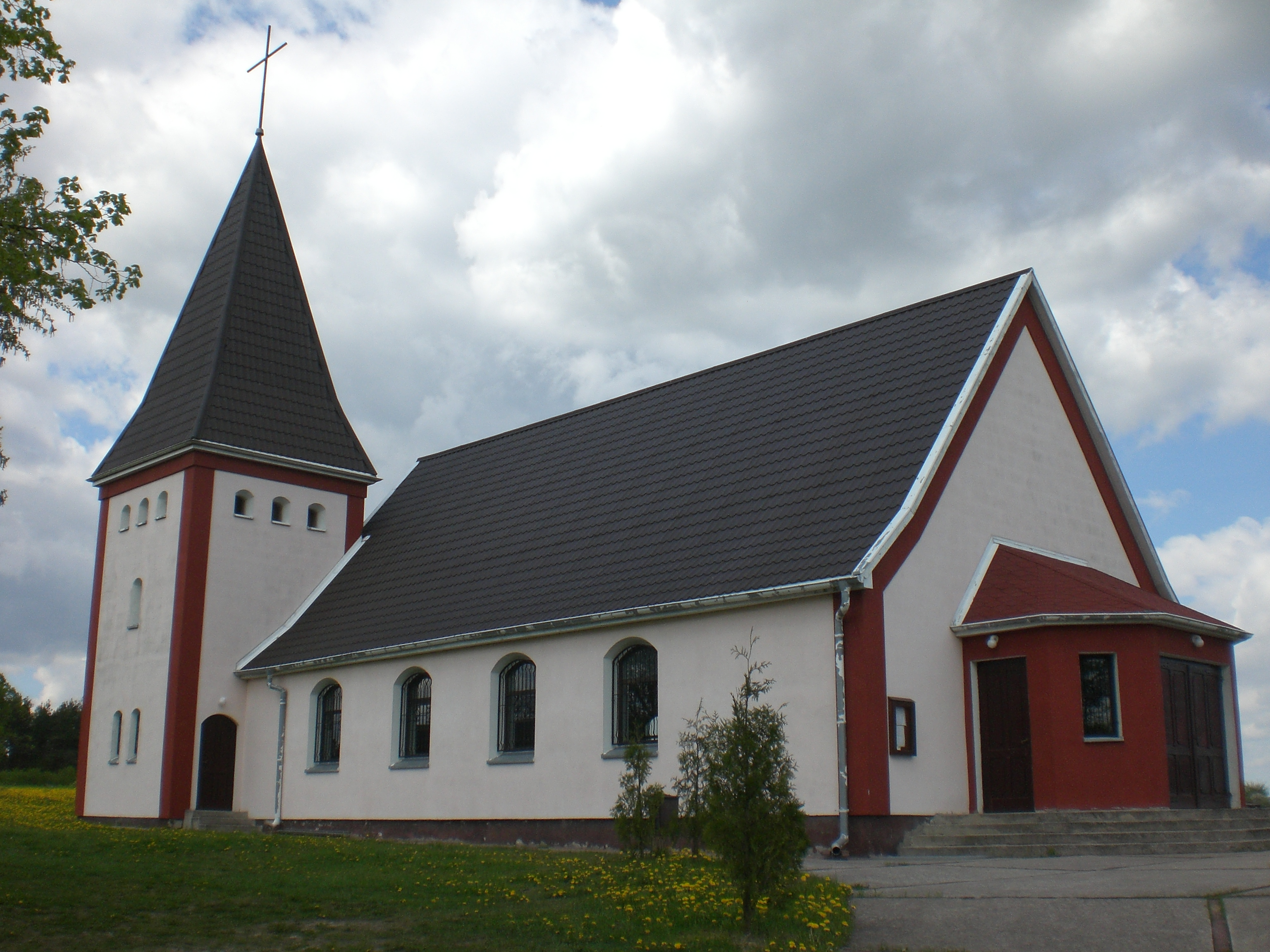
- Church of the Assumption of the Blessed Virgin Mary

- Location within Poland
- Coordinates: 53°58′35″N 18°16′52″E
- Country: Poland
- Voivodeship: Pomeranian
- County: Kościerzyna
- Gmina: Stara Kiszewa

Population
  - Total: 245
- Vehicle registration: GKS

Góra [ˈɡura] is a village in the administrative district of Gmina Stara Kiszewa, within Kościerzyna County, Pomeranian Voivodeship, in northern Poland. It is located in the ethnocultural region of Kociewie in the historic region of Pomerania.

Six Polish citizens were murdered by Nazi Germany in the village during World War II.
