= Skowarcz =

- Village
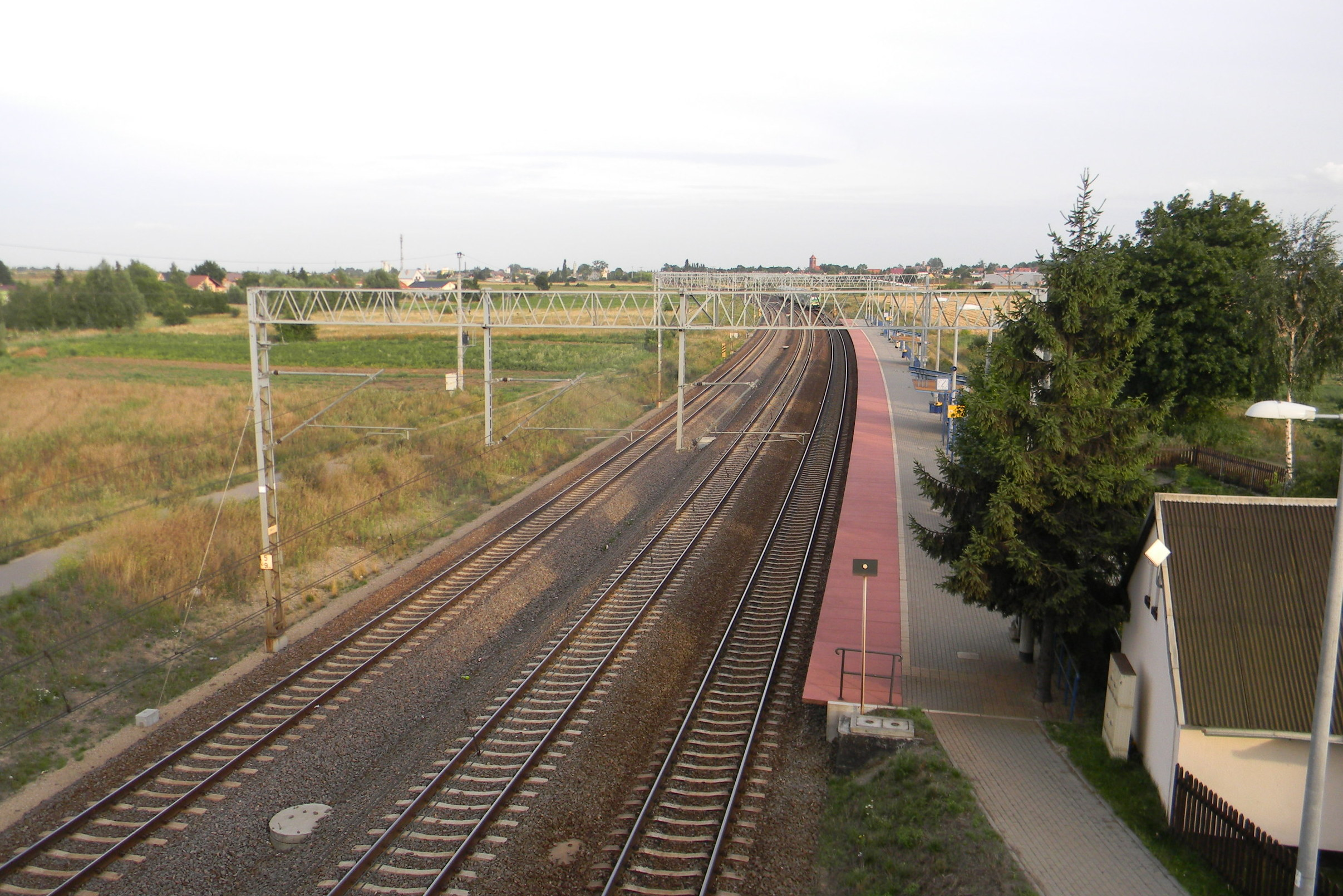
- Train station in Skowarcz

- Location within Poland
- Coordinates: 54°11′4″N 18°40′43″E
- Country: Poland
- Voivodeship: Pomeranian
- County: Gdańsk
- Gmina: Pszczółki
- Population: 1,425
- Time zone: UTC+1 (CET)
  - Summer (DST): UTC+2 (CEST)
- Vehicle registration: GDA

Skowarcz [ˈskɔvart͡ʂ] is a village in the administrative district of Gmina Pszczółki, within Gdańsk County, Pomeranian Voivodeship, in northern Poland. It is located within the historic region of Pomerania.

== History ==
During World War II, in 1943–1944, the German administration operated a subcamp of the Stutthof concentration camp in the village. In August 1944, five prisoners managed to escape from the subcamp.

== Transport ==
The Polish National road 91 runs through the village, and the A1 motorway runs nearby, west of the village. There is also a train station in Skowarcz.
