= Dobromyśl, Chełm County =

Dobromyśl
- Village
- Location within Poland
- Coordinates: 51°13′N 23°11′E
- Country: Poland
- Voivodeship: Lublin
- County: Chełm
- Gmina: Siedliszcze

Population
  - Total: 83

Dobromyśl [dɔˈbrɔmɨɕl] is a village in the administrative district of Gmina Siedliszcze, within Chełm County, Lublin Voivodeship, in eastern Poland.
