= Helenowo, Gmina Kleczew =

Helenowo
- Village
- Location within Poland
- Coordinates: 52°21′36″N 18°13′07″E
- Country: Poland
- Voivodeship: Greater Poland
- County: Konin
- Gmina: Kleczew

Helenowo [xɛlɛˈnɔvɔ] is a village in the administrative district of Gmina Kleczew, within Konin County, Greater Poland Voivodeship, in west-central Poland.
