= Aleksander Jackowski =

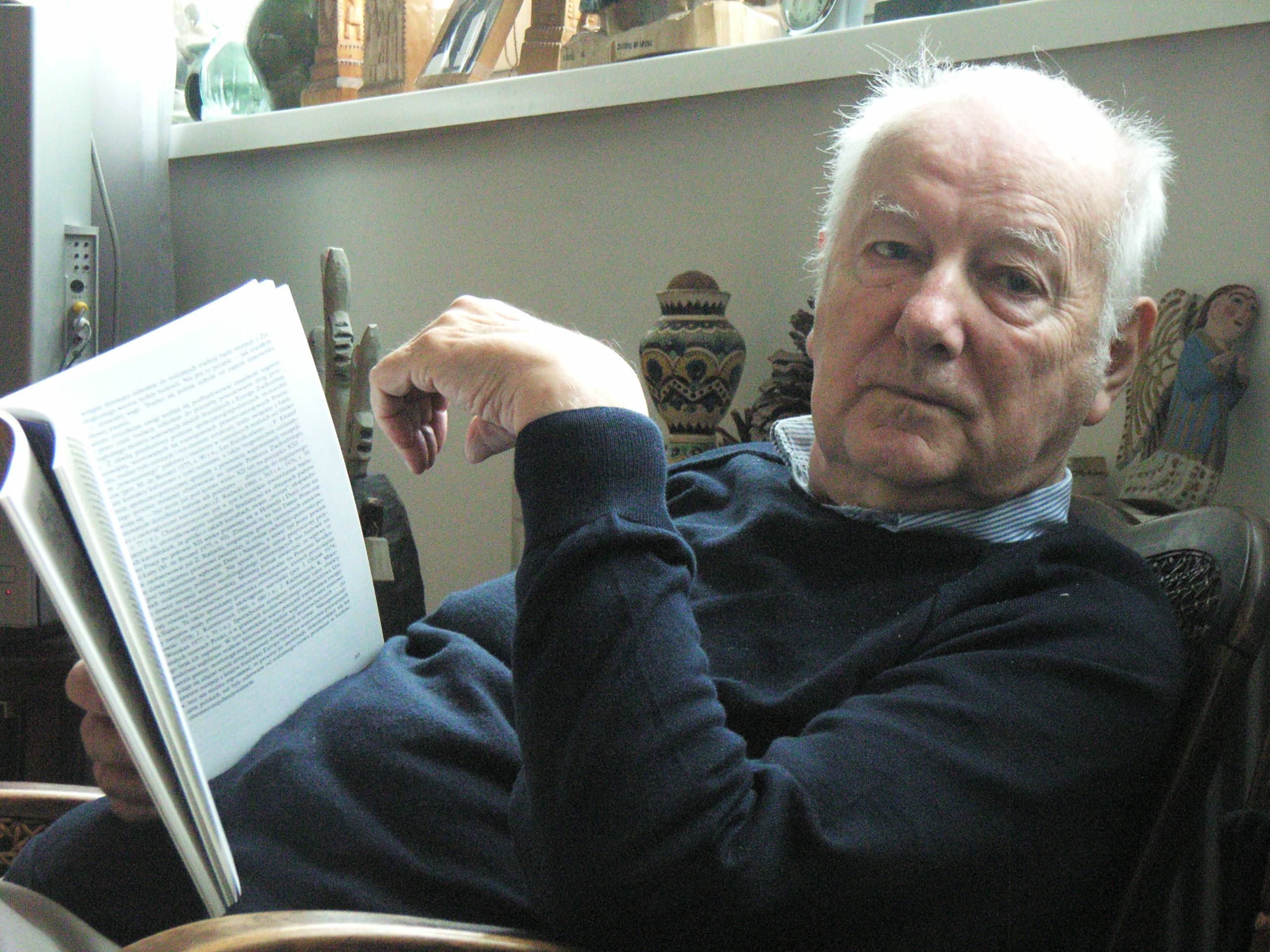
Aleksander Jackowski, Vienna 2007

Aleksander Jackowski (19 January 1920, Warsaw – 1 January 2017, Warsaw) was a Polish cultural anthropologist, ethnographer, art critic. Author of various works on folk, contemporary, naïve art and l’art brut.

== Biography ==
He grew up in Warsaw, in a family of intellectuals. In 1940 he was sent by Soviets from Lviv to Siberia, where he first came in contact with the folk culture of the Khanty. He worked as a lumberjack, bellman, tractor driver, stove fitter, turner and locksmith. His shattered ankle was fixed by a shaman, who was hiding in the woods from the Soviets. He returned to Poland with the General Berling Army in 1943. He took part in the battles of Puławy and Warsaw. He finished his military career as a major, as the Deputy Military Commander of Warsaw in May 1945. He studied sociology and attended art history lectures. Until 1948, he worked in the Ministry of Foreign Affairs, as the director of the Minister's Cabinet managing the Press and Information Department. In 1948, he became the deputy editor in chief of the weekly “Odrodzenie” (Renascence). From the end of 1949, he was the Deputy Director and Head of the Department of Folk and Naïve Art at the Art Institute in the Polish Academy of Sciences. At that time he started a big field project of collecting Polish Music and Verbal Folklores. In the years between 1952 and 1998 he was the editor in chief of the quarterly “Konteksty. Polska Sztuka Ludowa” (Contexts. Polish Folk Art). He managed the Department of Folk and Naïve Art until 1984. He is the author of more than 400 publications on folk art, contemporary art, art naïve and l’art brut. He was the longtime associate of the Institute of Ethnology and Cultural Anthropology at the University of Warsaw and a member of the Committee of Ethnological Sciences in Polish Academy of Sciences, Council of Culture Foundation, Council of the Centre for Contemporary Art and juror of the “Małe ojczyzny” (Small Homelands) competitions.

== Published works ==
=== Books ===
- Sztuka ludu polskiego (1965)
- Sztuka zwana naiwną (1995)
- Obrazy ludowe (1998)
- O rzeźbach i rzeźbiarzach (1997)
- Cepelia. Tradycja i współczesność (1999)
- Pejzaż frasobliwy. Kapliczki i krzyże przydrożnePolska sztuka ludowa (2002)
- Świat Nikifora (2005)

=== Articles ===
- 1954 Z zagadnień historii i metodologii badań nad sztuką ludową, „Materiały do Studiów i Dyskusji z Zakresu Teorii i Historii Sztuki, Krytyki Artystycznej oraz Badań nad Sztuką”, R. 5, nr 3-4.
- 1958 Ignacy Kamiński, rzeźbiarz z Oraczewa, PSL, R. 12, nr 4.
- 1959 Sytuacja i perspektywy sztuki ludowej w Polsce, PSL, R. 13, nr 4.
- 1960 O motywach ludowych i ich adaptacji, PSL, R. 14, nr 4.
- 1964 Współczesna rzeźba ludowa, PSL, R. 18, nr 1.
- 1966 Kicz – sztuka jarmarczna – sztuka ludowa. Dyskusja, PSL, R. 20, nr 3-4.
- 1966 Odpust w Białymstoku 1965 r., PSL, R. 20, nr 3-4.
- 1966 Kolorowe figurki z cukru, PSL, R. 20, nr 3-4.
- 1968 Pogranicze sztuki naiwnej i ludowej, PSL, R. 22, nr 1-2.
- 1974 Kopernik w ludowej rzeźbie, PSL, R. 28, nr 1.
- 1974 Sobota i inni, PSL, R. 28, nr 2.
- 1975 Sztuka ludowa, relikt czy wartość żywa?, PSL, R. 29, nr 3.
- 1976 Współczesna rzeźba zwana ludową, PSL, R. 30, nr 3-4.
- 1977 Współczesne malarstwo ludowe i jego pogranicza, PSL, R. 31, nr 2, 3 i 4.
- 1980 Pojęcie twórcy ludowego, „Lud”, t. 64.
- 1981 Pomniki ludu, PSL, R. 35, nr 3-4.
- 1981 Sztuka ludowa, [w] Etnografia Polski. Przemiany Kultury Ludowej, t. 2, Wrocław-Warszawa-Kraków-Gdańsk-Łódź 1981.
- 1983 Obrazy Rozalii Barańskiej-Dzięciołowskiej, PSL, R. 37, nr 1-2.
- 1991 Kultura ludowa – sztuka ludowa, „Lud”, tom 74.
