= Wola Korybutowa Pierwsza =

- Village
- Location within Poland
- Coordinates: 51°13′08″N 23°06′05″E
- Country: Poland
- Voivodeship: Lublin
- County: Chełm
- Gmina: Siedliszcze

Wola Korybutowa Pierwsza [ˈvɔla kɔrɨbuˈtɔva ˈpjɛrfʂa] is a village in the administrative district of Gmina Siedliszcze, within Chełm County, Lublin Voivodeship, in eastern Poland.
