= Sarniak, Lublin Voivodeship =

Sarniak
- Village
- Location within Poland
- Coordinates: 50°58′N 23°34′E
- Country: Poland
- Voivodeship: Lublin
- County: Chełm
- Gmina: Leśniowice

Sarniak [ˈsarɲak] is a village in the administrative district of Gmina Leśniowice, within Chełm County, Lublin Voivodeship, in eastern Poland. The approximate population is 338.
