= Ignatów-Kolonia =

- Village
- Location within Poland
- Coordinates: 51°8′21″N 23°35′34″E
- Country: Poland
- Voivodeship: Lublin
- County: Chełm
- Gmina: Kamień

Ignatów-Kolonia [iɡˈnatuf kɔˈlɔɲa] is a village in the administrative district of Gmina Kamień, within Chełm County, Lublin Voivodeship, in eastern Poland.
