= Podgórze, Lublin Voivodeship =

Podgórze
- Village
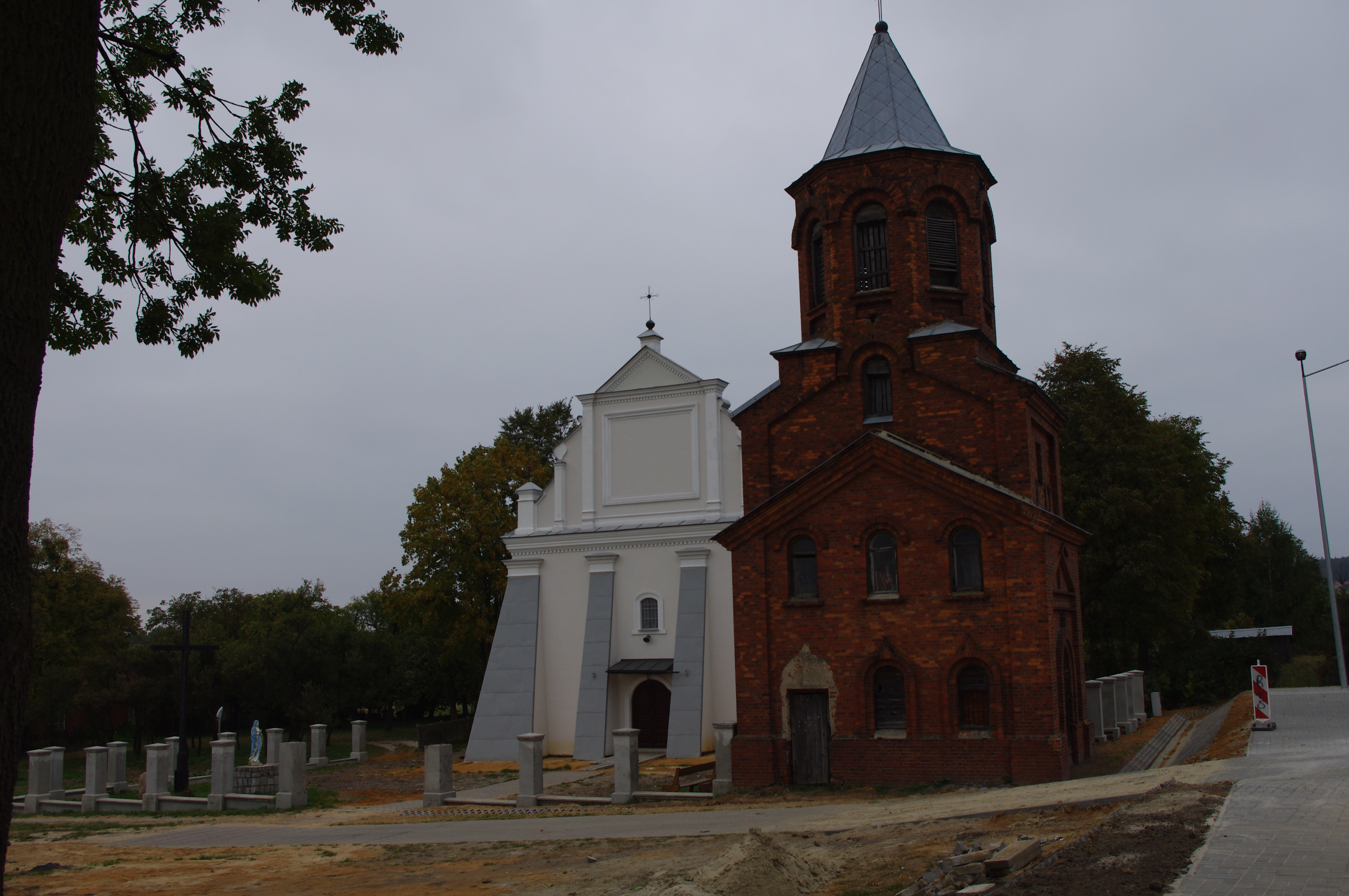
- Salvator church in Podgórze

- Location within Poland
- Coordinates: 51°09′11″N 23°21′20″E
- Country: Poland
- Voivodeship: Lublin
- County: Chełm
- Gmina: Chełm

Podgórze [pɔdˈɡuʐɛ] is a village in the administrative district of Gmina Chełm, within Chełm County, Lublin Voivodeship, in eastern Poland.
