= Tytusin =

- Village
- Location within Poland
- Coordinates: 51°10′N 23°20′E
- Country: Poland
- Voivodeship: Lublin
- County: Chełm
- Gmina: Chełm

Tytusin [tɨˈtuɕin] is a village in the administrative district of Gmina Chełm, within Chełm County, Lublin Voivodeship, in eastern Poland.
