= Stare Depułtycze =

- Village
- Location within Poland
- Coordinates: 51°03′35″N 23°23′22″E
- Country: Poland
- Voivodeship: Lublin
- County: Chełm
- Gmina: Chełm

Stare Depułtycze [ˈstarɛ dɛpuu̯ˈtɨt͡ʂɛ] is a village in the administrative district of Gmina Chełm, within Chełm County, Lublin Voivodeship, in eastern Poland.
