= Wygnańce =

- Village
- Location within Poland
- Coordinates: 50°58′N 23°36′E
- Country: Poland
- Voivodeship: Lublin
- County: Chełm
- Gmina: Leśniowice

Wygnańce [vɨɡˈnaɲt͡sɛ] is a village in the administrative district of Gmina Leśniowice, within Chełm County, Lublin Voivodeship, in eastern Poland.
