= Okszów-Kolonia =

- Village
- Location within Poland
- Coordinates: 51°09′27″N 23°30′12″E
- Country: Poland
- Voivodeship: Lublin
- County: Chełm
- Gmina: Chełm

Okszów-Kolonia [ˈɔkʂuf kɔˈlɔɲa] is a village in the administrative district of Gmina Chełm, within Chełm County, Lublin Voivodeship, in eastern Poland.
