= Zarzecze, Chełm County =

Zarzecze
- Village
- Location within Poland
- Coordinates: 51°12′N 23°28′E
- Country: Poland
- Voivodeship: Lublin
- County: Chełm
- Gmina: Chełm

Zarzecze [zaˈʐɛt͡ʂɛ] is a village in the administrative district of Gmina Chełm, within Chełm County, Lublin Voivodeship, in eastern Poland.
