= Haliczany =

- Village
- Location within Poland
- Coordinates: 51°3′N 23°36′E
- Country: Poland
- Voivodeship: Lublin
- County: Chełm
- Gmina: Kamień

Haliczany [xaliˈt͡ʂanɨ] is a village in the administrative district of Gmina Kamień, within Chełm County, Lublin Voivodeship, in eastern Poland.
