= Karolinów, Lublin Voivodeship =

Karolinów
- Village
- Location within Poland
- Coordinates: 51°12′N 23°35′E
- Country: Poland
- Voivodeship: Lublin
- County: Chełm
- Gmina: Ruda-Huta
- Time zone: UTC+1 (CET)
  - Summer (DST): UTC+2 (CEST)

Karolinów [karɔˈlinuf] is a village in the administrative district of Gmina Ruda-Huta, within Chełm County, Lublin Voivodeship, in eastern Poland, close to the border with Ukraine.

== History ==
Four Polish citizens were murdered by Nazi Germany in the village during World War II.
