= Nowe Depułtycze =

- Village
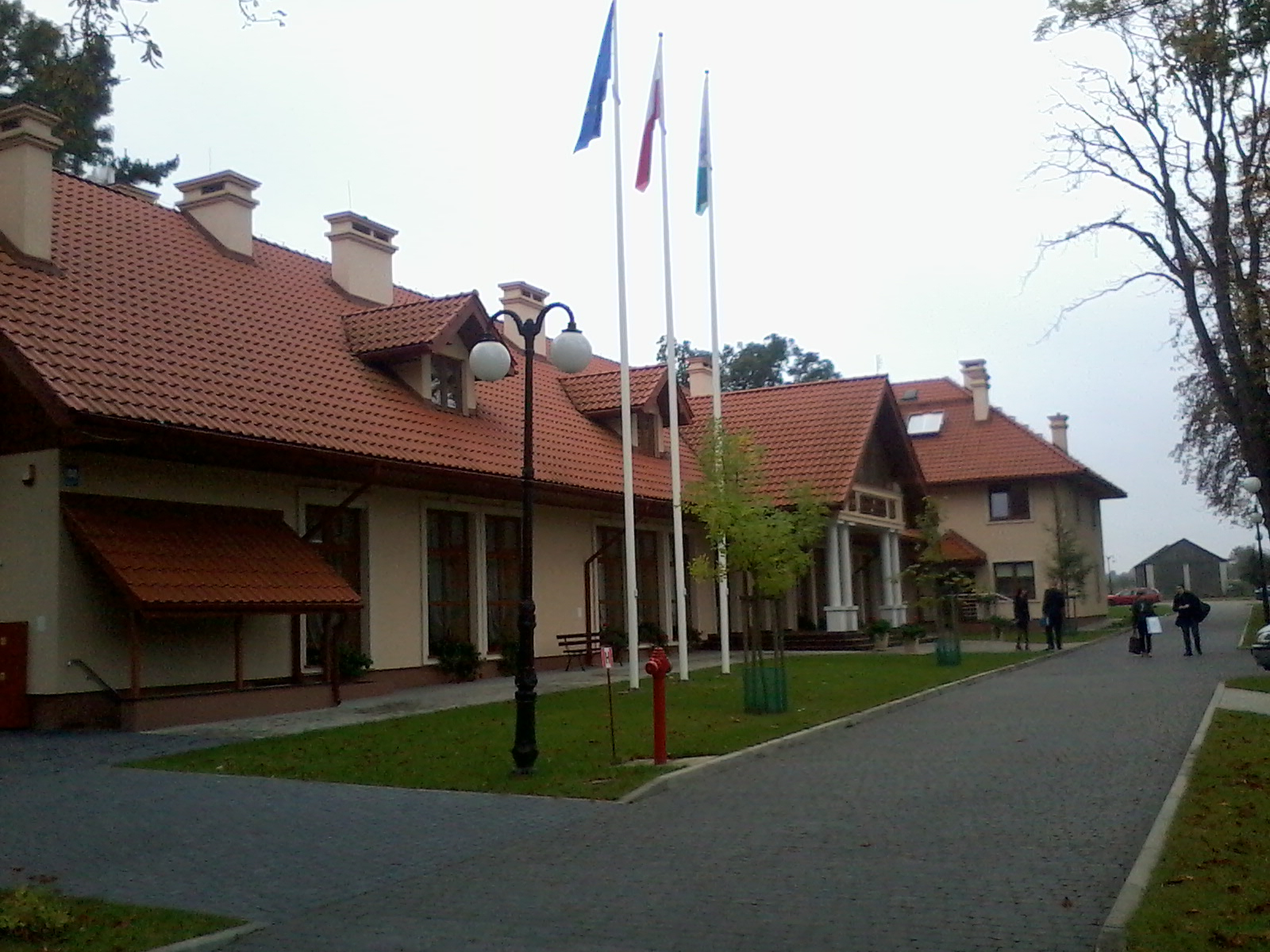
- The State School of Higher Education in Chełm (Poland)

- Location within Poland
- Coordinates: 51°04′09″N 23°23′43″E
- Country: Poland
- Voivodeship: Lublin
- County: Chełm
- Gmina: Chełm

Nowe Depułtycze [ˈnɔvɛ dɛpuu̯ˈtɨt͡ʂɛ] is a village in the administrative district of Gmina Chełm, within Chełm County, Lublin Voivodeship, in eastern Poland.
