= Teresin, Gmina Leśniowice =

Teresin
- Village
- Location within Poland
- Coordinates: 50°58′55″N 23°33′16″E
- Country: Poland
- Voivodeship: Lublin
- County: Chełm
- Gmina: Leśniowice

Teresin (Polish pronunciation: [tɛˈrɛɕin]) is a village in the administrative district of Gmina Leśniowice, within Chełm County, Lublin Voivodeship, in eastern Poland.
