= Józefin, Gmina Chełm =

Józefin
- Village
- Location within Poland
- Coordinates: 51°11′20″N 23°20′44″E
- Country: Poland
- Voivodeship: Lublin
- County: Chełm
- Gmina: Chełm

Józefin [juˈzɛfʲin] is a village in the administrative district of Gmina Chełm, within Chełm County, Lublin Voivodeship, in eastern Poland.
