= Majdan Leśniowski =

- Village
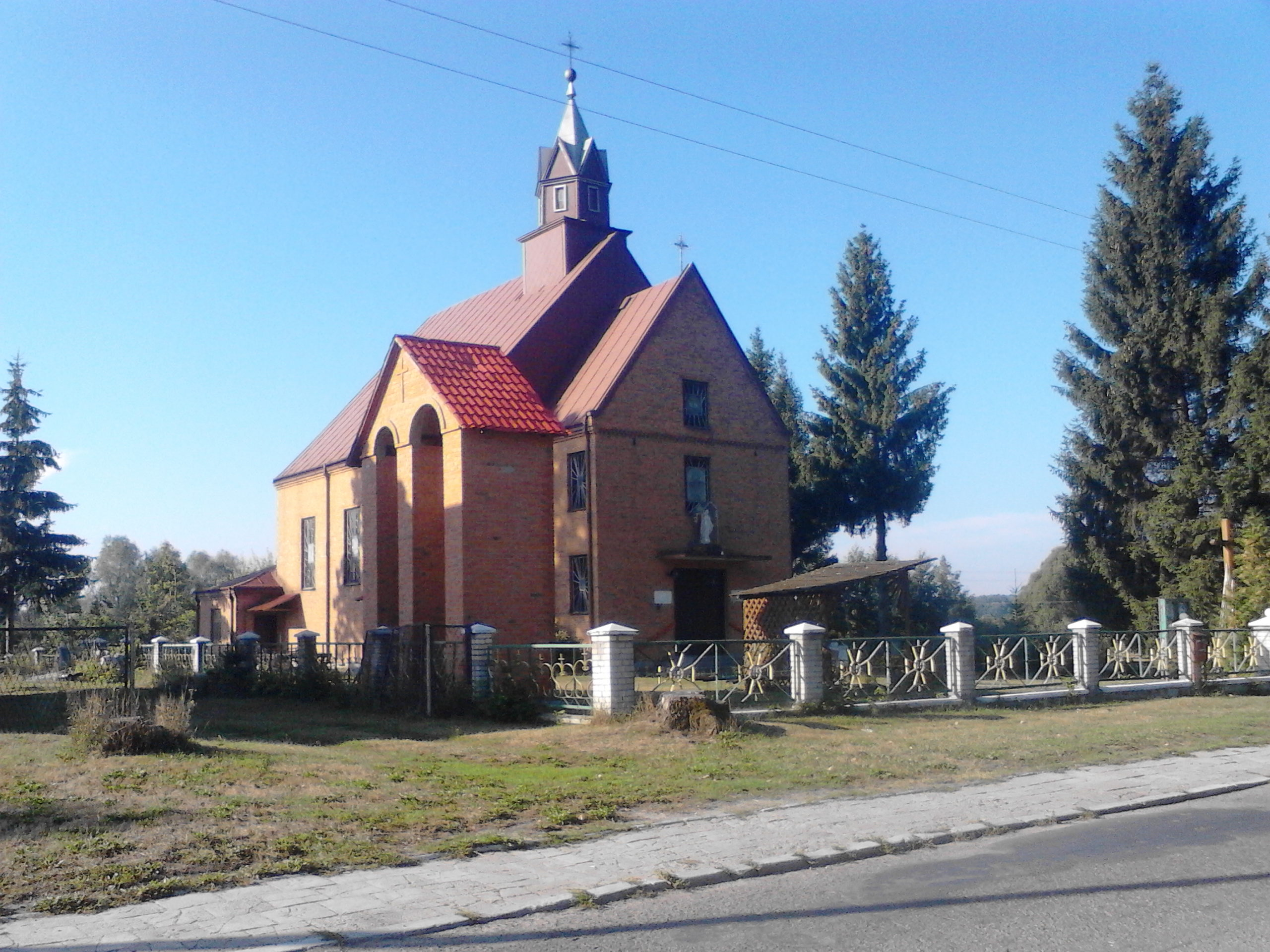
- Polish Catholic church in Majdan Leśniowski

- Location within Poland
- Coordinates: 51°0′N 23°32′E
- Country: Poland
- Voivodeship: Lublin
- County: Chełm
- Gmina: Leśniowice
- Time zone: UTC+1 (CET)
  - Summer (DST): UTC+2 (CEST)

Majdan Leśniowski (Polish pronunciation: [ˈmajdan lɛɕˈɲɔfskʲi]) is a village in the administrative district of Gmina Leśniowice, within Chełm County, Lublin Voivodeship, in eastern Poland.

== History ==
Four Polish citizens were murdered by Nazi Germany in the village during World War II.
