= Nowosiółki, Chełm County =

Nowosiółki
- Village
- Location within Poland
- Coordinates: 51°11′N 23°21′E
- Country: Poland
- Voivodeship: Lublin
- County: Chełm
- Gmina: Chełm

Nowosiółki [nɔvɔˈɕuu̯kʲi] is a village in the administrative district of Gmina Chełm, within Chełm County, Lublin Voivodeship, in eastern Poland. The population is 192 people (as of 2011).

== History ==
From 1975 to 1998, the village was administratively attached to the Voivodeship of Chełm.

Since 1999 it has been part of the Lublin Voivodeship.

== Proper name ==
Initially, in 1564 the name appears as Nowosielce, as Nowoszolky in 1589, and as Nowosielce Chełmskie in 1796, then in modern times was transformed by derivation into Nowosiółki.

== Demography ==
Demographic structure as of March 2011:

	Total	Below working age	Of working age	Post-working age
Men	93	21	63	9
Women	99	24	53	22
Total	192	45	116	31

As of September 1921, the village had 37 houses and 217 inhabitants, of whom:

- 110 men and 107 women;
- 132 Orthodox Christians, 85 Roman Catholics;
- 131 Ukrainians (Ruthenians), 86 Poles.
