= Rudka, Gmina Chełm =

Rudka
- Village
- Location within Poland
- Coordinates: 51°08′00″N 23°04′00″E
- Country: Poland
- Voivodeship: Lublin
- County: Chełm
- Gmina: Chełm

Rudka [ˈrutka] is a village in the administrative district of Gmina Chełm, within Chełm County, Lublin Voivodeship, in eastern Poland.
