= Koczów =

- Village
- Location within Poland
- Coordinates: 51°2′N 23°35′E
- Country: Poland
- Voivodeship: Lublin
- County: Chełm
- Gmina: Kamień

Koczów [ˈkɔt͡ʂuf] is a village in the administrative district of Gmina Kamień, within Chełm County, Lublin Voivodeship, in eastern Poland.
