= Stańków =

- Village
- Location within Poland
- Coordinates: 51°10′20″N 23°28′40″E
- Country: Poland
- Voivodeship: Lublin
- County: Chełm
- Gmina: Chełm

Stańków [ˈstaɲkuf] is a village in the administrative district of Gmina Chełm, within Chełm County, Lublin Voivodeship, in eastern Poland. Stańków used to be the family seat of the Czapski family.
