= Alojzów =

Alojzów may refer to:

- Alojzów, Chełm County in Lublin Voivodeship (east Poland)
- Alojzów, Hrubieszów County in Lublin Voivodeship (east Poland)
- Alojzów, Masovian Voivodeship (east-central Poland)
