= Natalin, Chełm County =

Natalin
- Village
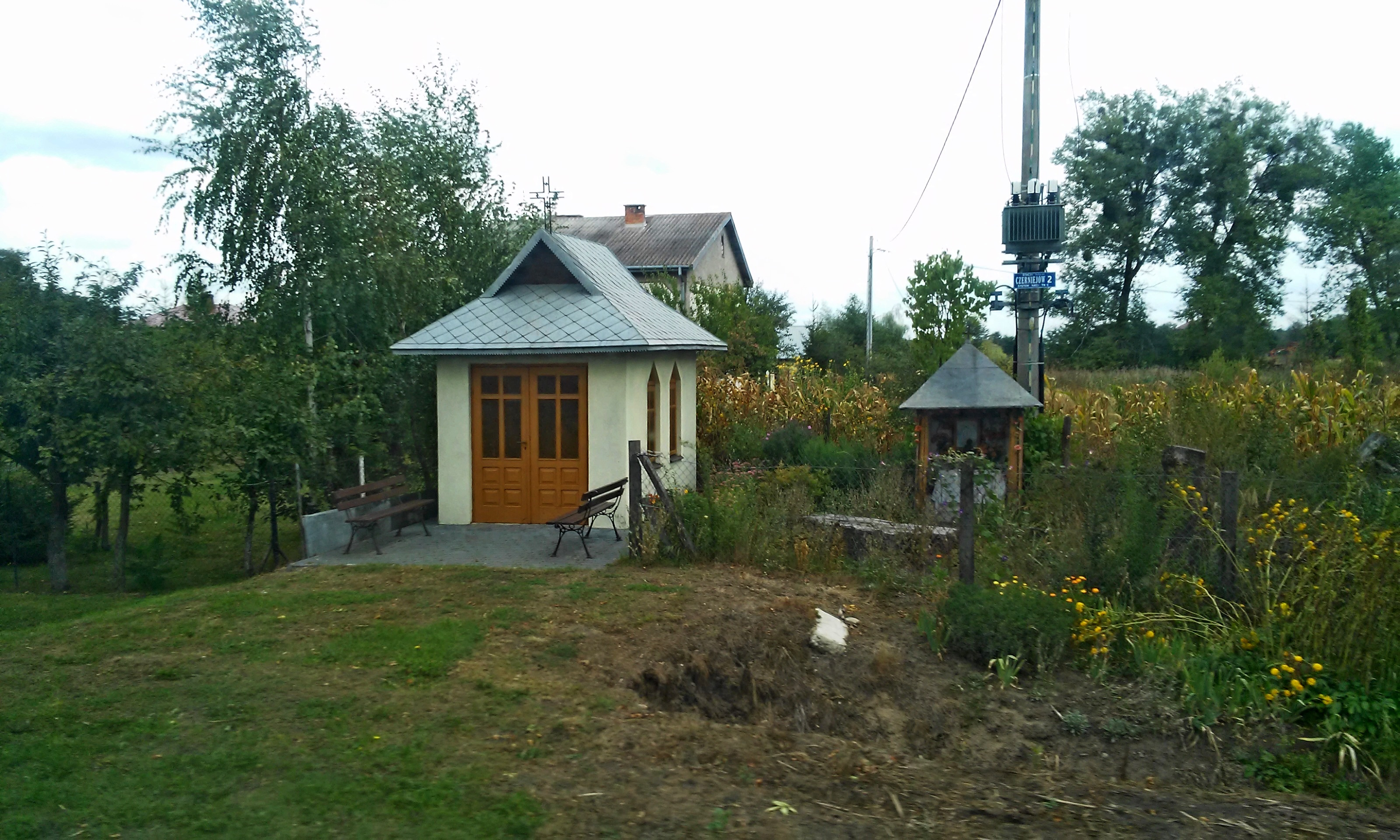

- Location within Poland
- Coordinates: 51°5′N 23°36′E
- Country: Poland
- Voivodeship: Lublin
- County: Chełm
- Gmina: Kamień
- Time zone: UTC+1 (CET)
  - Summer (DST): UTC+2 (CEST)

Natalin [naˈtalin] is a village in the administrative district of Gmina Kamień, within Chełm County, Lublin Voivodeship, in eastern Poland.

== History ==
Four Polish citizens were murdered by Nazi Germany in the village during World War II.
