= Wierzbica, Gmina Leśniowice =

Wierzbica
- Village
- Location within Poland
- Coordinates: 50°58′02″N 23°31′21″E
- Country: Poland
- Voivodeship: Lublin
- County: Chełm
- Gmina: Leśniowice
- Time zone: UTC+1 (CET)
  - Summer (DST): UTC+2 (CEST)

Wierzbica [vjɛʐˈbit͡sa] is a village in the administrative district of Gmina Leśniowice, within Chełm County, Lublin Voivodeship, in eastern Poland.

== History ==
Seven Polish citizens were murdered by Nazi Germany in the village during World War II.
