= Janówka, Chełm County =

Janówka
- Village
- Location within Poland
- Coordinates: 50°59′N 23°29′E
- Country: Poland
- Voivodeship: Lublin
- County: Chełm
- Gmina: Leśniowice

Janówka [jaˈnufka] is a village in the administrative district of Gmina Leśniowice, within Chełm County, Lublin Voivodeship, in eastern Poland.
