= Tomasz Adamczuk =

Polish politician (1953–1993)

- Born: 4 January 1953; Rakołupy Duże, Lublin Voivodeship, Poland
- Died: 21 December 1993 (aged 40); Rakołupy Duże, Lublin Voivodeship, Poland
- Occupation: Politician
- Political party: Polish People's Party

Tomasz Lucjan Adamczuk (4 January 1953 – 21 December 1993) was a Polish politician from the Polish People's Party. born in 1953, he graduated University of Life Sciences in Lublin and joined United People's Party in 1979.

In September 1993, he was elected as member of the Sejm in its 9th term and as member of the Senate in its third term. Months later he died by suicide, hanging himself on 21 December 1993. His mandate formally expired on 3 February 1994.
