= Depułtycze Królewskie =

- Village
- Location within Poland
- Coordinates: 51°5′N 23°27′E
- Country: Poland
- Voivodeship: Lublin
- County: Chełm
- Gmina: Chełm
- Time zone: UTC+1 (CET)
  - Summer (DST): UTC+2 (CEST)
- Vehicle registration: LCH

Depułtycze Królewskie [dɛpuu̯ˈtɨt͡ʂɛ kruˈlɛfskʲɛ] is a village in the administrative district of Gmina Chełm, within Chełm County, Lublin Voivodeship, in eastern Poland.

During the January Uprising, on August 5, 1863, it was the site of the Battle of Depułtycze, in which Polish insurgents defeated Russian troops.
