= Zawadówka, Gmina Chełm =

Zawadówka
- Village
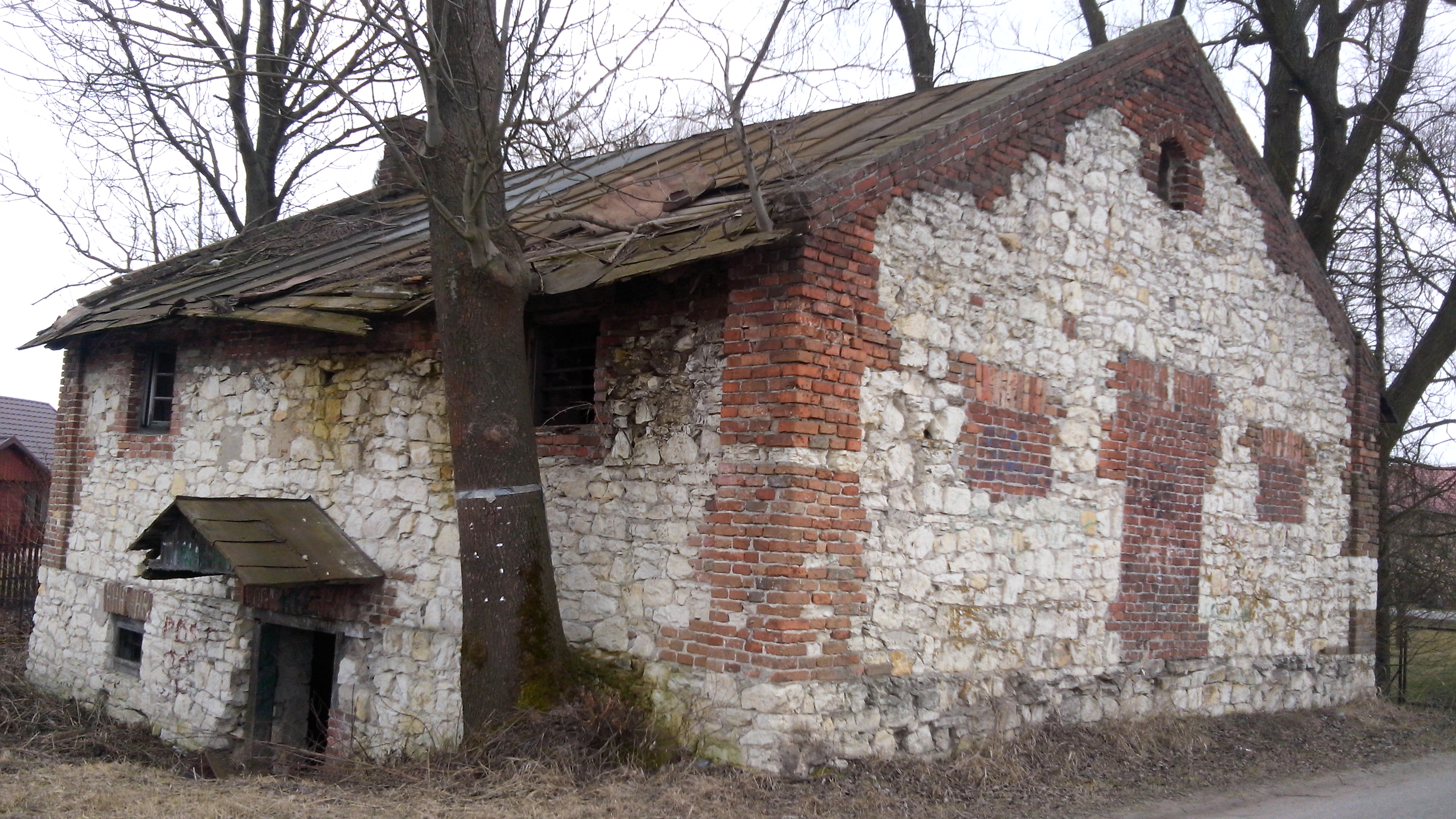

- Location within Poland
- Coordinates: 51°07′57″N 23°24′18″E
- Country: Poland
- Voivodeship: Lublin
- County: Chełm
- Gmina: Chełm

Zawadówka [zavaˈdufka] is a village in the administrative district of Gmina Chełm, within Chełm County, Lublin Voivodeship, in eastern Poland.
