= Andrzejów, Chełm County =

Andrzejów
- Village
- Location within Poland
- Coordinates: 51°5′N 23°41′E
- Country: Poland
- Voivodeship: Lublin
- County: Chełm
- Gmina: Kamień

Andrzejów [anˈdʐɛjuf] is a village in the administrative district of Gmina Kamień, within Chełm County, Lublin Voivodeship, in eastern Poland.
