= Pławanice-Kolonia =

- Village
- Location within Poland
- Coordinates: 51°07′57″N 23°38′05″E
- Country: Poland
- Voivodeship: Lublin
- County: Chełm
- Gmina: Kamień

Pławanice-Kolonia [pwavaˈnit͡sɛ kɔˈlɔɲa] is a village in the administrative district of Gmina Kamień, within Chełm County, Lublin Voivodeship, in eastern Poland.
