= Zagroda, Chełm County =

Zagroda
- Village
- Location within Poland
- Coordinates: 51°4′59″N 23°23′4″E
- Country: Poland
- Voivodeship: Lublin
- County: Chełm
- Gmina: Chełm

Population
  - Total: 278

Zagroda [zaˈɡrɔda] is a village in the administrative district of Gmina Chełm, within Chełm County, Lublin Voivodeship, in eastern Poland.
