= Leśniowice-Kolonia =

- Village
- Location within Poland
- Coordinates: 50°58′41″N 23°28′41″E
- Country: Poland
- Voivodeship: Lublin
- County: Chełm
- Gmina: Leśniowice

Leśniowice-Kolonia [lɛɕɲɔˈvit͡sɛ kɔˈlɔɲa] is a village in the administrative district of Gmina Leśniowice, within Chełm County, Lublin Voivodeship, in eastern Poland.
