= Czerniejów =

Czerniejów may refer to the following places:

- Czerniejów, Chełm County in Lublin Voivodeship (east Poland)
- Czerniejów, Lubartów County in Lublin Voivodeship (east Poland)
- Czerniejów, Gmina Jabłonna in Lublin Voivodeship (east Poland)
