= Kumów Majoracki =

Village in Leśniowice, Lublin Voivodeship, Poland

- Village
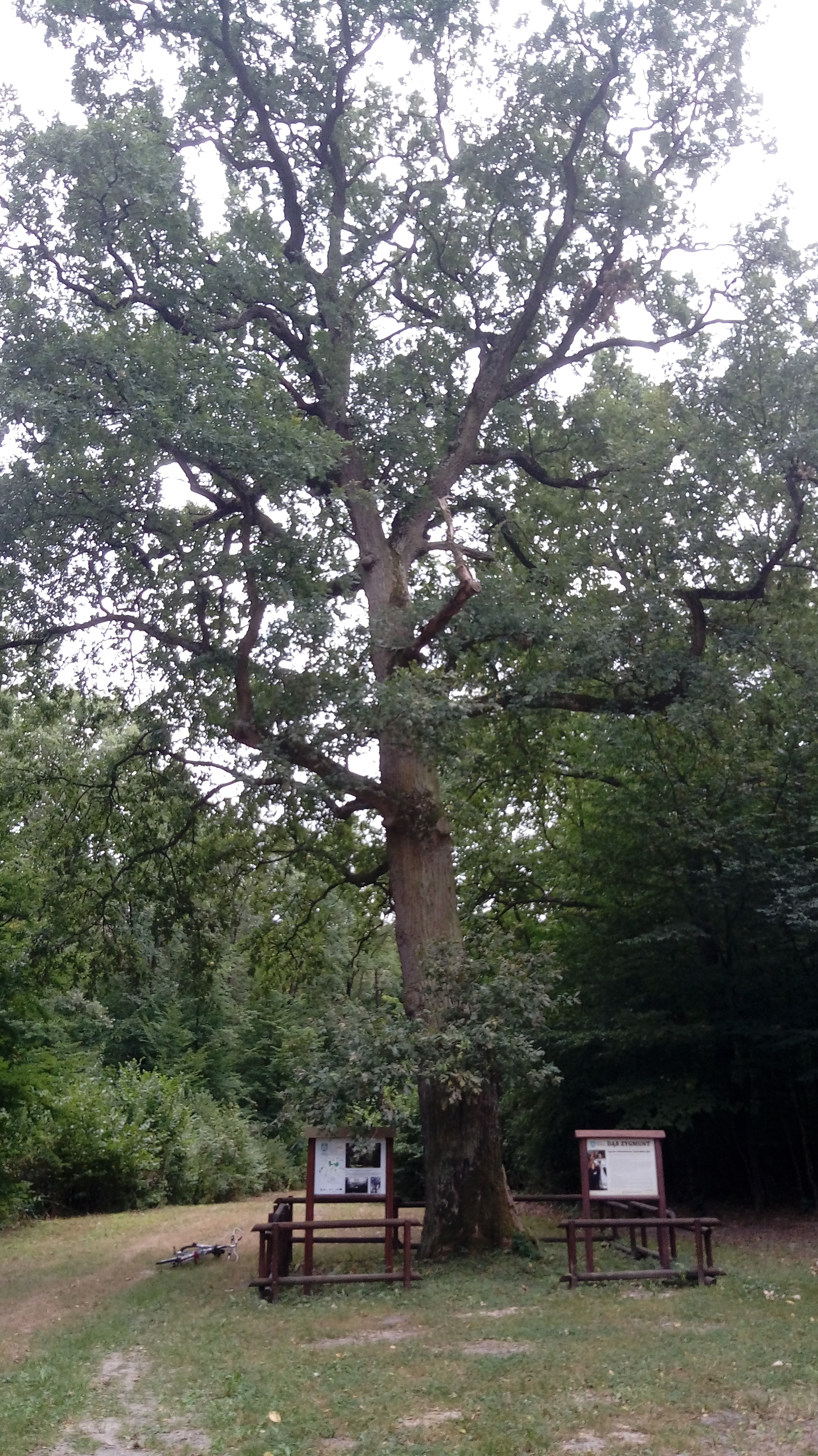

- Location within Poland
- Coordinates: 51°2′N 23°33′E
- Country: Poland
- Voivodeship: Lublin
- County: Chełm
- Gmina: Leśniowice
- Time zone: UTC+1 (CET)
  - Summer (DST): UTC+2 (CEST)

Kumów Majoracki [ˈkumuf majɔˈrat͡ski] is a village in the administrative district of Gmina Leśniowice, within Chełm County, Lublin Voivodeship, in eastern Poland.

== History ==
15 Polish citizens were murdered by Nazi Germany in the village during World War II.
