= Gotówka, Lublin Voivodeship =

Gotówka
- Village
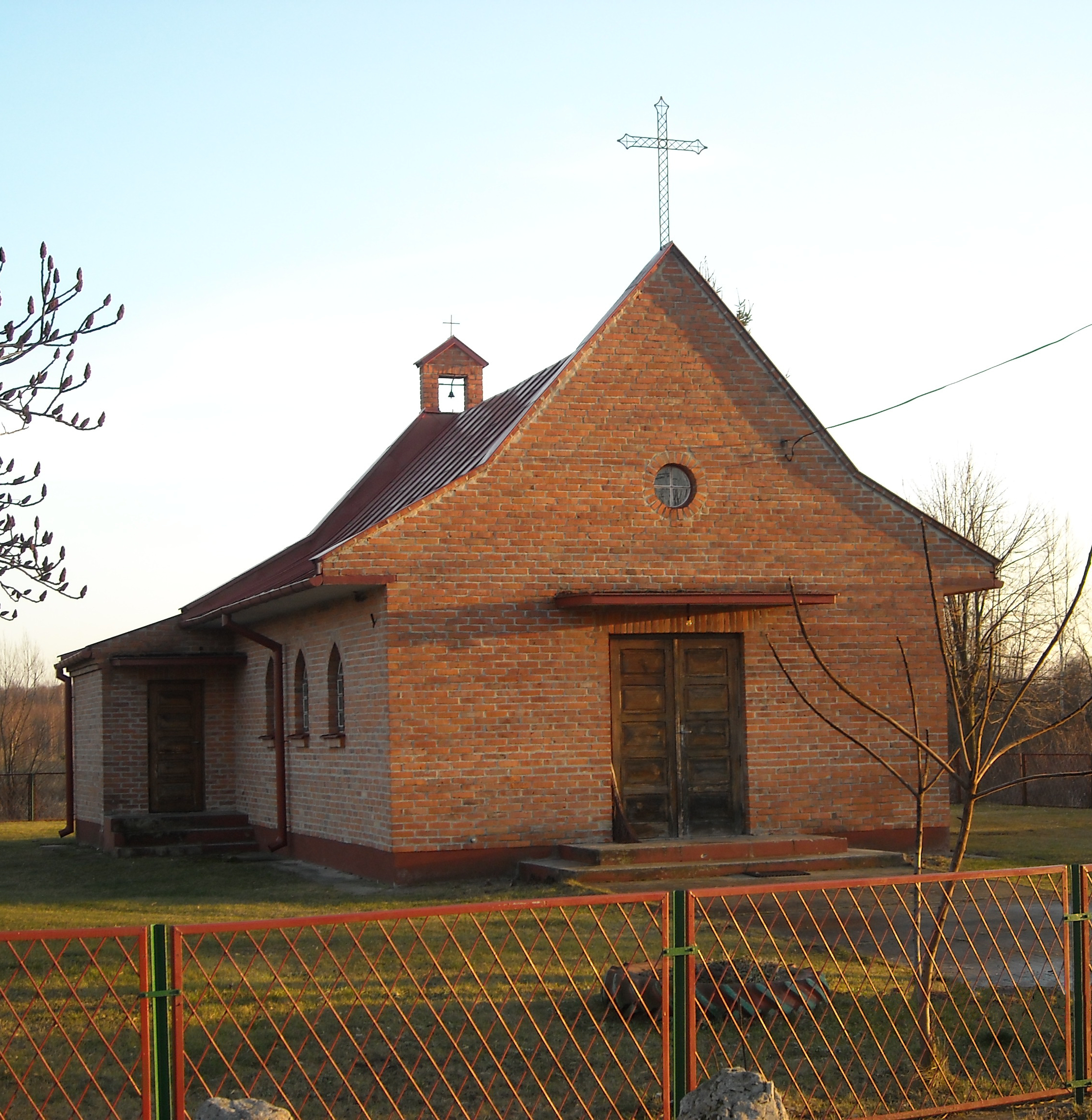
- Rudka (Poland, Lublin diocese, parish Ruda Huta), a shrine dedicated to the holy brothers Albert Chmielowski

- Location within Poland
- Coordinates: 51°10′43″N 23°32′41″E
- Country: Poland
- Voivodeship: Lublin
- County: Chełm
- Gmina: Ruda-Huta

Gotówka [ɡɔˈtufka] is a village in the administrative district of Gmina Ruda-Huta, within Chełm County, Lublin Voivodeship, in eastern Poland, close to the border with Ukraine.
