= Dębina, Chełm County =

Dębina
- Village
- Location within Poland
- Coordinates: 51°00′47″N 23°27′48″E
- Country: Poland
- Voivodeship: Lublin
- County: Chełm
- Gmina: Leśniowice

Dębina [dɛmˈbina] is a village in the administrative district of Gmina Leśniowice, within Chełm County, Lublin Voivodeship, in eastern Poland.
