= Kumów Plebański =

- Village
- Location within Poland
- Coordinates: 51°02′20″N 23°33′05″E
- Country: Poland
- Voivodeship: Lublin
- County: Chełm
- Gmina: Leśniowice

Kumów Plebański [ˈkumuf plɛˈbaɲski] is a village in the administrative district of Gmina Leśniowice, within Chełm County, Lublin Voivodeship, in eastern Poland.
