= Gdola =

- Village
- Location within Poland
- Coordinates: 51°13′N 23°37′E
- Country: Poland
- Voivodeship: Lublin
- County: Chełm
- Gmina: Ruda-Huta

Gdola [ˈɡdɔla] is a village in the administrative district of Gmina Ruda-Huta, within Chełm County, Lublin Voivodeship, in eastern Poland, close to the border with Ukraine.
