= Wojniaki =

- Village
- Location within Poland
- Coordinates: 51°3′N 23°22′E
- Country: Poland
- Voivodeship: Lublin
- County: Chełm
- Gmina: Chełm

Wojniaki [vɔi̯ˈɲakʲi] is a village in the administrative district of Gmina Chełm, within Chełm County, Lublin Voivodeship, in eastern Poland.
