= Staw, Lublin Voivodeship =

Staw
- Village
- Location within Poland
- Coordinates: 51°12′N 23°24′E
- Country: Poland
- Voivodeship: Lublin
- County: Chełm
- Gmina: Chełm

Population
  - Total: 540
- Time zone: UTC+1 (CET)
  - Summer (DST): UTC+2 (CEST)
- Vehicle registration: LCH

Staw [staf] is a village in the administrative district of Gmina Chełm, within Chełm County, Lublin Voivodeship, in eastern Poland.
