= Rakołupy Małe =

- Village
- Location within Poland
- Coordinates: 50°59′43″N 23°26′16″E
- Country: Poland
- Voivodeship: Lublin
- County: Chełm
- Gmina: Leśniowice

Rakołupy Małe [rakɔˈwupɨ ˈmawɛ] is a village in the administrative district of Gmina Leśniowice, within Chełm County, Lublin Voivodeship, in eastern Poland.
