= Strachosław =

- Village
- Location within Poland
- Coordinates: 51°5′N 23°33′E
- Country: Poland
- Voivodeship: Lublin
- County: Chełm
- Gmina: Kamień
- Time zone: UTC+1 (CET)
  - Summer (DST): UTC+2 (CEST)

Strachosław [straˈxɔswaf] is a village in the administrative district of Gmina Kamień, within Chełm County, Lublin Voivodeship, in eastern Poland.

== History ==
Three Polish citizens were murdered by Nazi Germany in the village during World War II.
