= Nowiny, Chełm County =

Nowiny
- Village
- Location within Poland
- Coordinates: 51°11′N 23°30′E
- Country: Poland
- Voivodeship: Lublin
- County: Chełm
- Gmina: Chełm

Nowiny [nɔˈvʲinɨ] is a village in the administrative district of Gmina Chełm, within Chełm County, Lublin Voivodeship, in eastern Poland.
