= Wólka Czułczycka =

- Village
- Location within Poland
- Coordinates: 51°12′N 23°29′E
- Country: Poland
- Voivodeship: Lublin
- County: Chełm
- Gmina: Chełm

Wólka Czułczycka [ˈvulka t͡ʂuu̯ˈt͡ʂɨt͡ska] is a village in the administrative district of Gmina Chełm, within Chełm County, Lublin Voivodeship, in eastern Poland.
