= Janów, Chełm County =

Janów
- Village
- Location within Poland
- Coordinates: 51°9′47″N 23°23′8″E
- Country: Poland
- Voivodeship: Lublin
- County: Chełm
- Gmina: Chełm

Janów [ˈjanuf] is a village in the administrative district of Gmina Chełm, within Chełm County, Lublin Voivodeship, in eastern Poland.
