= Nowy Folwark, Lublin Voivodeship =

Nowy Folwark
- Village
- Location within Poland
- Coordinates: 50°58′N 23°28′E
- Country: Poland
- Voivodeship: Lublin
- County: Chełm
- Gmina: Leśniowice

Nowy Folwark [ˈnɔvɨ ˈfɔlvark] is a village in the administrative district of Gmina Leśniowice, within Chełm County, Lublin Voivodeship, in eastern Poland.
