= Żółtańce-Kolonia =

- Village
- Location within Poland
- Coordinates: 51°06′59″N 23°26′42″E
- Country: Poland
- Voivodeship: Lublin
- County: Chełm
- Gmina: Chełm

Żółtańce-Kolonia [ʐuu̯ˈtaɲt͡sɛ kɔˈlɔɲa] is a village in the administrative district of Gmina Chełm, within Chełm County, Lublin Voivodeship, in eastern Poland.
