= Wolawce =

- Village
- Location within Poland
- Coordinates: 51°4′N 23°35′E
- Country: Poland
- Voivodeship: Lublin
- County: Chełm
- Gmina: Kamień

Wolawce [vɔˈlaft͡sɛ] is a village in the administrative district of Gmina Kamień, within Chełm County, Lublin Voivodeship, in eastern Poland.
