= Plisków-Kolonia =

- Village
- Location within Poland
- Coordinates: 51°00′06″N 23°28′31″E
- Country: Poland
- Voivodeship: Lublin
- County: Chełm
- Gmina: Leśniowice

Plisków-Kolonia [ˈpliskuf kɔˈlɔɲa] is a village in the administrative district of Gmina Leśniowice, within Chełm County, Lublin Voivodeship, in eastern Poland.
