= Depułtycze Królewskie-Kolonia =

- Village
- Location within Poland
- Coordinates: 51°03′24″N 23°25′44″E
- Country: Poland
- Voivodeship: Lublin
- County: Chełm
- Gmina: Chełm

Depułtycze Królewskie-Kolonia [dɛpuu̯ˈtɨt͡ʂɛ kruˈlɛfskʲɛ kɔˈlɔɲa] is a village in the administrative district of Gmina Chełm, within Chełm County, Lublin Voivodeship, in eastern Poland.
