= Antonin, Lublin Voivodeship =

Antonin
- Village
- Location within Poland
- Coordinates: 51°9′5″N 23°35′11″E
- Country: Poland
- Voivodeship: Lublin
- County: Chełm
- Gmina: Chełm

Antonin [anˈtɔɲin] is a village in the administrative district of Gmina Chełm, within Chełm County, Lublin Voivodeship, in eastern Poland.
