= Ignatów, Lublin Voivodeship =

Ignatów
- Village
- Location within Poland
- Coordinates: 51°8′N 23°35′E
- Country: Poland
- Voivodeship: Lublin
- County: Chełm
- Gmina: Kamień

Ignatów [iɡˈnatuf] is a village in the administrative district of Gmina Kamień, within Chełm County, Lublin Voivodeship, in eastern Poland.
