= Nowosiółki-Kolonia =

- Village
- Location within Poland
- Coordinates: 51°10′29″N 23°21′31″E
- Country: Poland
- Voivodeship: Lublin
- County: Chełm
- Gmina: Chełm

Nowosiółki-Kolonia [nɔvɔˈɕuu̯kʲi kɔˈlɔɲa] is a village in the administrative district of Gmina Chełm, within Chełm County, Lublin Voivodeship, in eastern Poland.
