= Ruda-Opalin =

- Village
- Location within Poland
- Coordinates: 51°15′N 23°36′E
- Country: Poland
- Voivodeship: Lublin
- County: Chełm
- Gmina: Ruda-Huta

Ruda-Opalin [ˈruda ɔˈpalin] is a village in the administrative district of Gmina Ruda-Huta, within Chełm County, Lublin Voivodeship, in eastern Poland, close to the border with Ukraine.
