= Józefin, Gmina Kamień =

Józefin
- Village
- Location within Poland
- Coordinates: 51°07′02″N 23°32′04″E
- Country: Poland
- Voivodeship: Lublin
- County: Chełm
- Gmina: Kamień

Józefin [juˈzɛfin] is a village in the administrative district of Gmina Kamień, within Chełm County, Lublin Voivodeship, in eastern Poland.
