= Horodyszcze-Kolonia =

- Village
- Location within Poland
- Coordinates: 51°10′2″N 23°26′10″E
- Country: Poland
- Voivodeship: Lublin
- County: Chełm
- Gmina: Chełm

Horodyszcze-Kolonia [xɔrɔˈdɨʂt͡ʂɛ kɔˈlɔɲa] is a village in the administrative district of Gmina Chełm, within Chełm County, Lublin Voivodeship, in eastern Poland.
