= Strupin Duży =

- Village
- Location within Poland
- Coordinates: 51°5′N 23°30′E
- Country: Poland
- Voivodeship: Lublin
- County: Chełm
- Gmina: Chełm
- Time zone: UTC+1 (CET)
  - Summer (DST): UTC+2 (CEST)
- Vehicle registration: LCH

Strupin Duży [ˈstrupʲin ˈduʐɨ] is a village in the administrative district of Gmina Chełm, within Chełm County, Lublin Voivodeship, in eastern Poland.
