= Stołpie, Lublin Voivodeship =

Stołpie
- Village
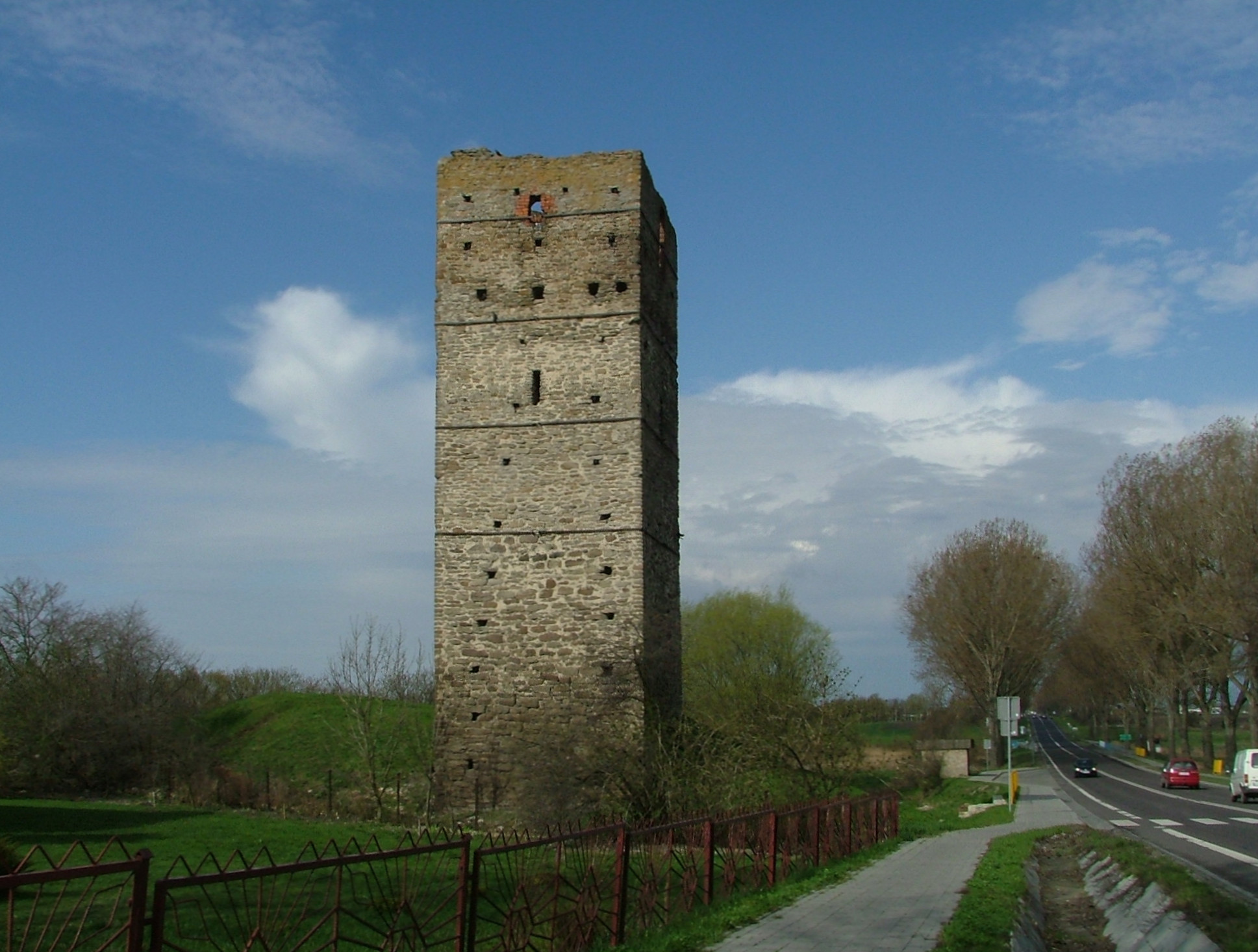
- 12th-century tower

- Location within Poland
- Coordinates: 51°10′28″N 23°19′9″E
- Country: Poland
- Voivodeship: Lublin
- County: Chełm
- Gmina: Chełm
- Time zone: UTC+1 (CET)
  - Summer (DST): UTC+2 (CEST)

Stołpie [ˈstɔu̯pʲɛ] is a village in the administrative district of Gmina Chełm, within Chełm County, Lublin Voivodeship, in eastern Poland.

== History ==
Six Polish citizens were murdered by Nazi Germany in the village during World War II.
