= Kamień-Kolonia, Lublin Voivodeship =

Kamień-Kolonia
- Village
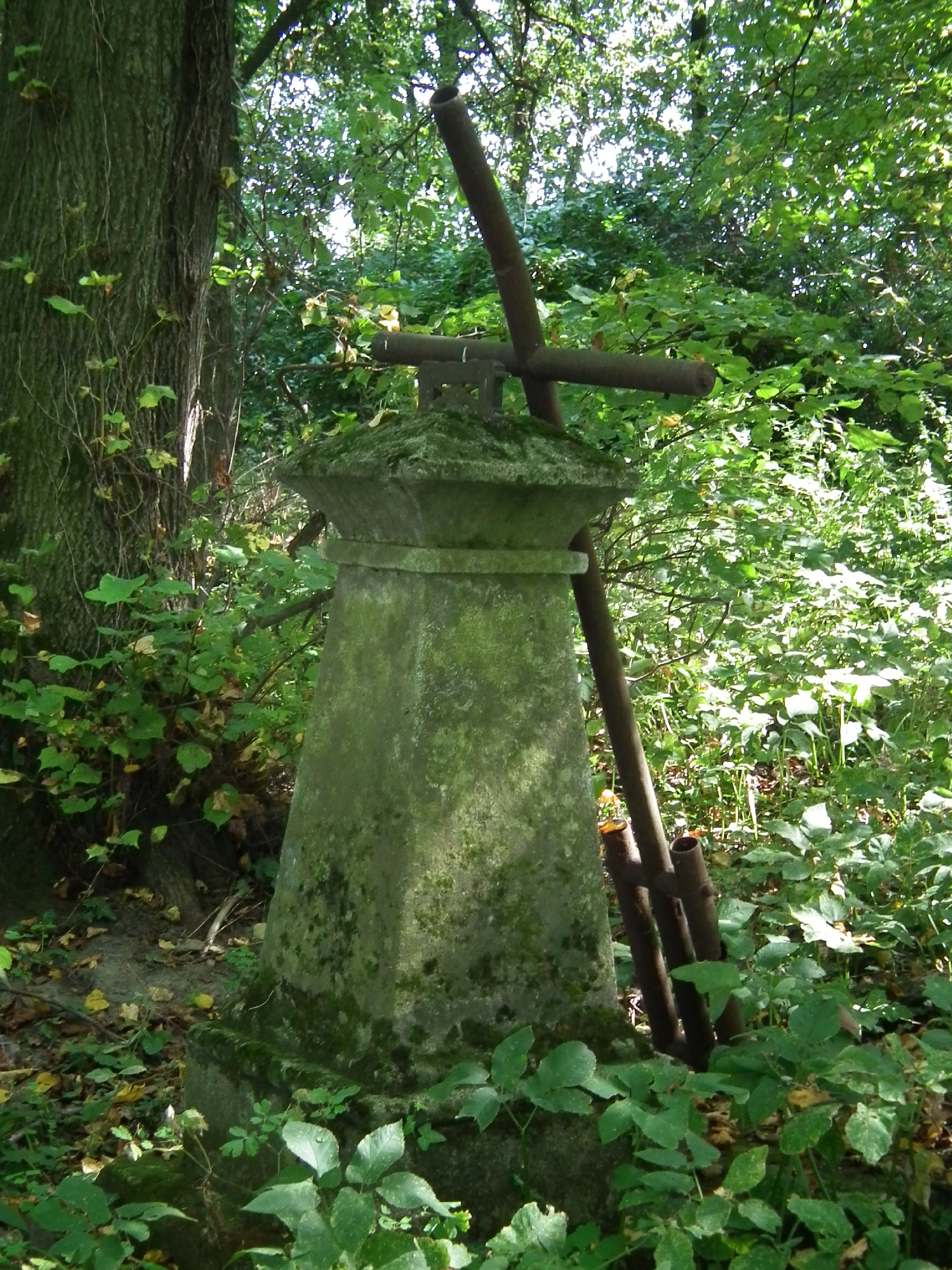
- Cemetery in Kamień-Kolonia

- Location within Poland
- Coordinates: 51°07′24″N 23°35′30″E
- Country: Poland
- Voivodeship: Lublin
- County: Chełm
- Gmina: Kamień

Kamień-Kolonia (Polish pronunciation: [ˈkamjɛj̃ kɔˈlɔɲa]) is a village in the administrative district of Gmina Kamień, within Chełm County, Lublin Voivodeship, in eastern Poland.
