= Majdan Pławanicki =

- Village
- Location within Poland
- Coordinates: 51°06′29″N 23°38′24″E
- Country: Poland
- Voivodeship: Lublin
- County: Chełm
- Gmina: Kamień

Majdan Pławanicki (Polish pronunciation: [ˈmajdan pwavaˈɲitskʲi]) is a village in the administrative district of Gmina Kamień, within Chełm County, Lublin Voivodeship, in eastern Poland.

== History ==
Initially recorded in 1827, the village name Majdan Pławanicki has evolved alongside the settlement’s demographics, which prior to World War II included a significant Ukrainian population. During post-war relocations from 1944 to 1946, many Ukrainian inhabitants were transferred to the Soviet Union, and the vacated land was subsequently populated by Polish settlers from regions of Ukraine that were then part of the USSR.
