= Gmina Kamień, Lublin Voivodeship =

Gmina Kamień Kamień Commune
- Gmina
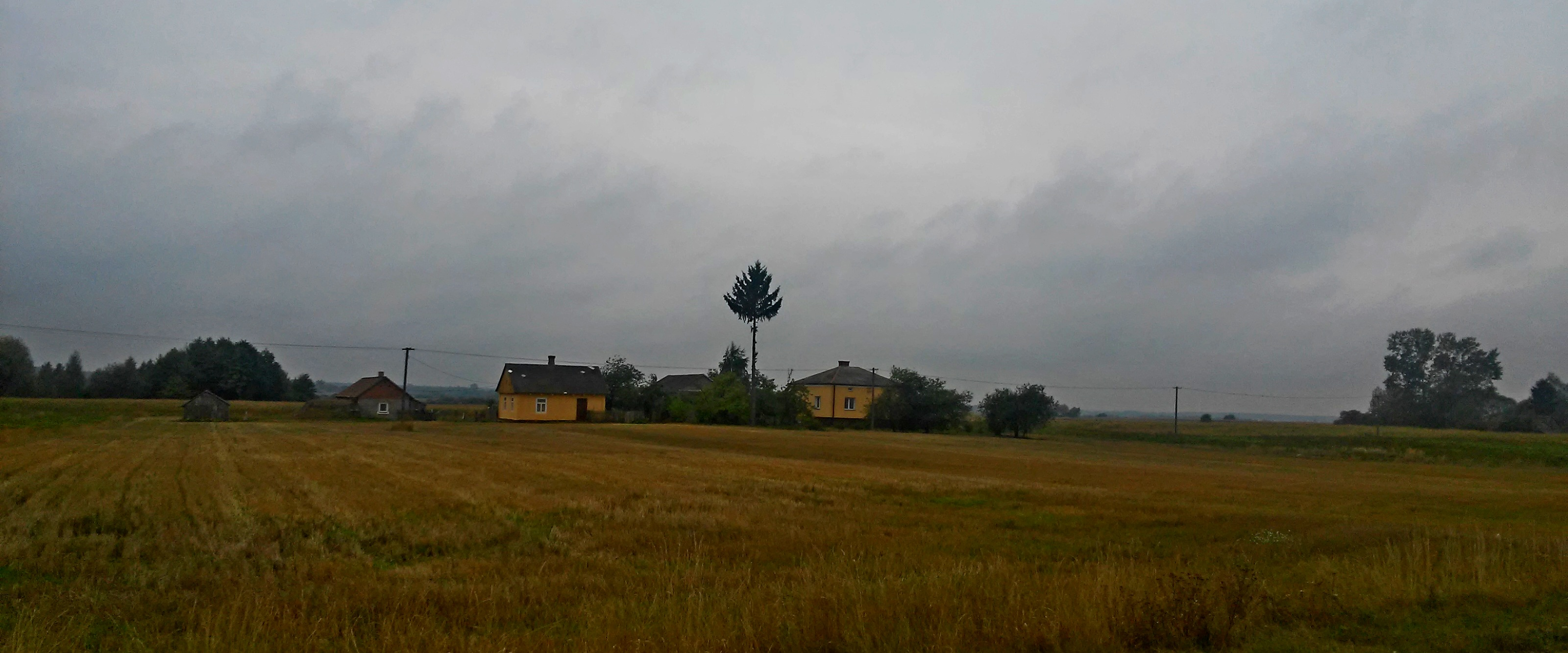

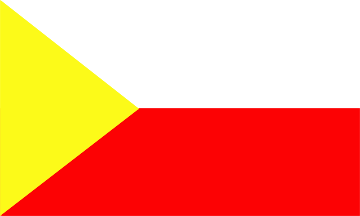
- Flag Coat of arms
- Interactive map of Gmina Kamień
- Coordinates (Kamień): 51°6′N 23°35′E
- Country: Poland
- Voivodeship: Lublin
- County: Chełm County
- Seat: Kamień

Area
  - Total: 96.9 km^{2} (37.4 sq mi)

Population (2006)
  - Total: 4,037
  - Density: 41.7/km^{2} (108/sq mi)
- Website: http://www.kamien.lubelskie.pl/

Gmina Kamień is a rural gmina (administrative district) in Chełm County, Lublin Voivodeship, in eastern Poland. Its seat is the village of Kamień, which lies approximately 9 kilometres (6 mi) south-east of Chełm and 73 km (45 mi) east of the regional capital Lublin.

The gmina covers an area of 96.9 square kilometres (37.4 sq mi), and as of 2006 its total population is 4,037.

== Villages ==
Gmina Kamień contains the villages and settlements of Andrzejów, Czerniejów, Haliczany, Ignatów, Ignatów-Kolonia, Józefin, Kamień, Kamień-Kolonia, Koczów, Majdan Pławanicki, Mołodutyn, Natalin, Pławanice, Pławanice-Kolonia, Rudolfin, Strachosław and Wolawce.

== Neighbouring gminas ==
Gmina Kamień is bordered by the gminas of Chełm, Dorohusk, Leśniowice and Żmudź.
