= Hniszów =

- Village
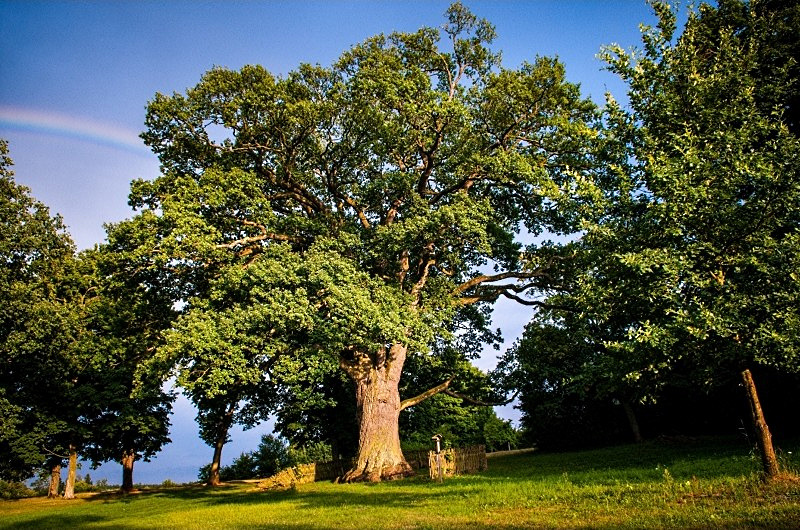
- Bolko Oak in Hniszów, an oak tree over 650 years old

- Location within Poland
- Coordinates: 51°15′N 23°42′E
- Country: Poland
- Voivodeship: Lublin
- County: Chełm
- Gmina: Ruda-Huta

Population
  - Total: 200
- Time zone: UTC+1 (CET)
  - Summer (DST): UTC+2 (CEST)
- Vehicle registration: LCH

Hniszów [ˈxniʂuf] is a village in the administrative district of Gmina Ruda-Huta, within Chełm County, Lublin Voivodeship, in eastern Poland, close to the border with Ukraine.
