= Gmina Chełm =

Gmina Chełm Chełm Commune
- Gmina
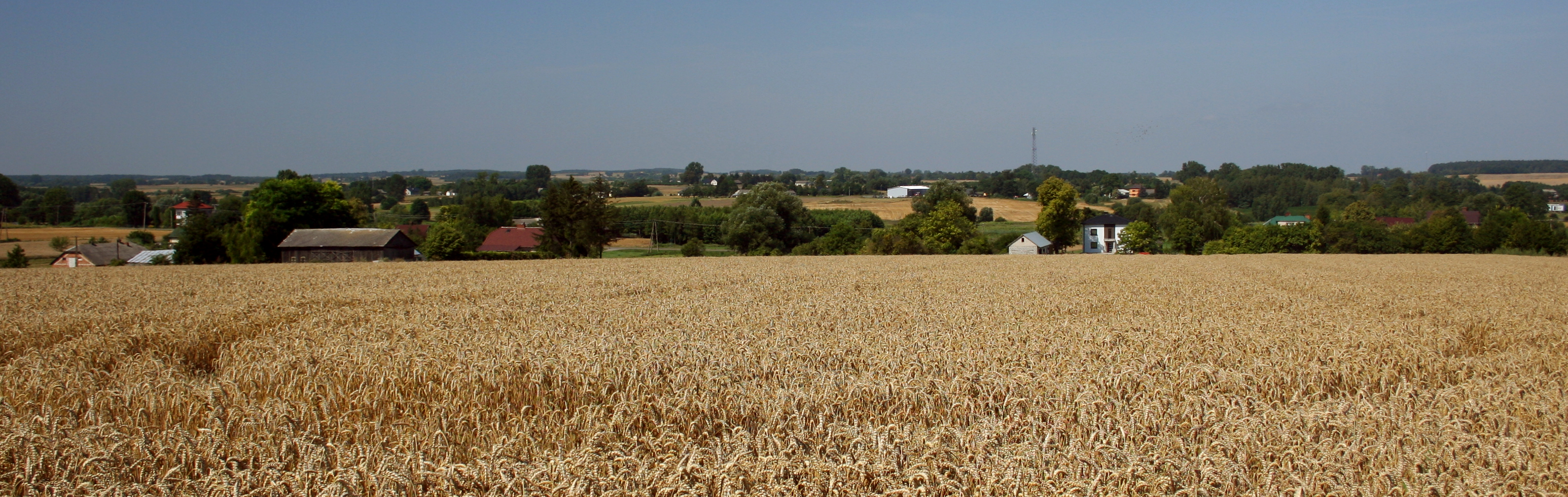

- Flag Coat of arms

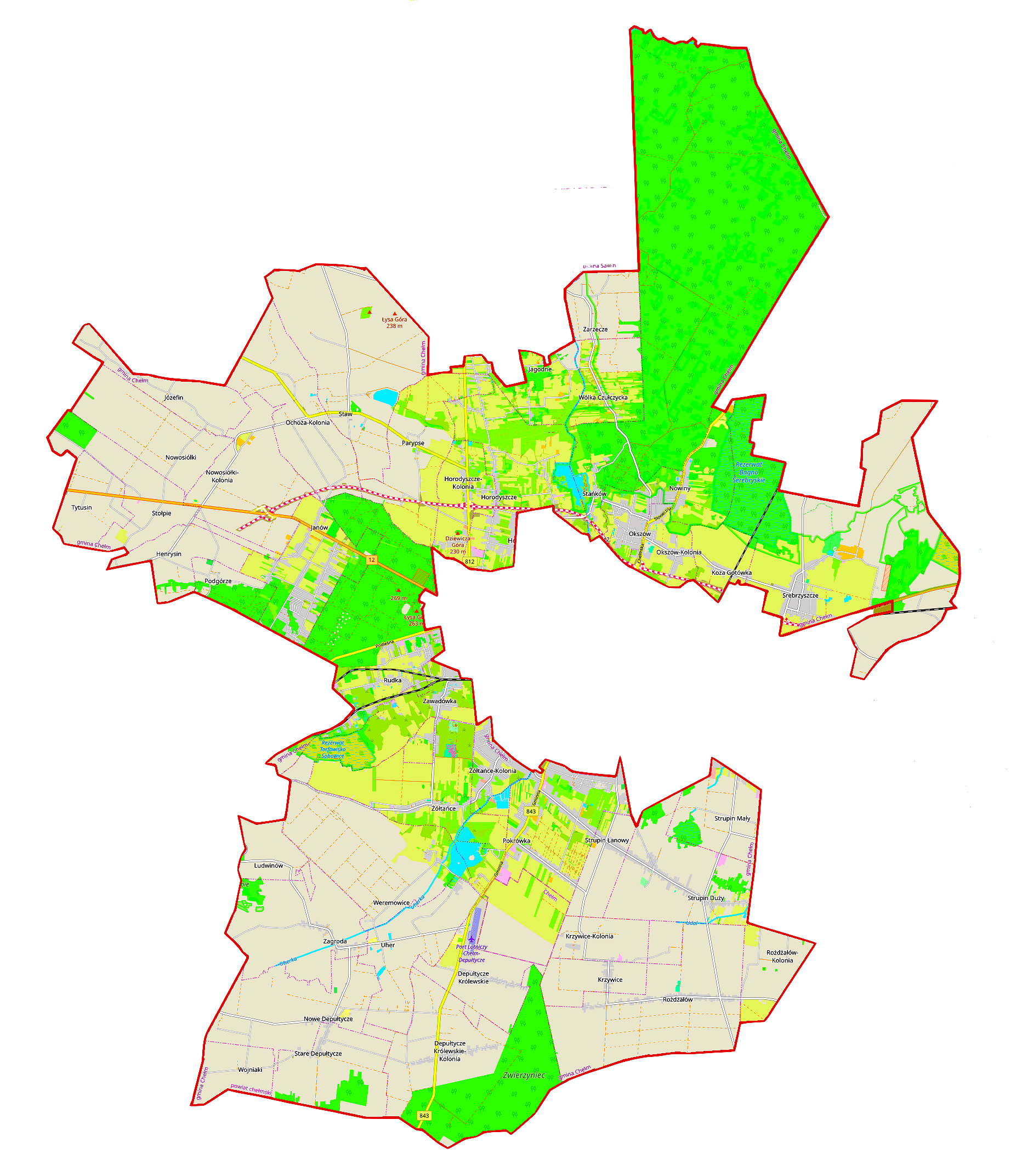

- Location within Poland
- Coordinates (Pokrówka): 51°6′N 23°27′E
- Country: Poland
- Voivodeship: Lublin
- County: Chełm County
- Seat: Pokrówka

Area
  - Total: 221.8 km^{2} (85.6 sq mi)

Population (2016)
  - Total: 14,146
  - Density: 63.78/km^{2} (165.2/sq mi)
- Website: http://www.gmina.chelm.pl/

Gmina Chełm is a rural gmina (administrative district) in Chełm County, Lublin Voivodeship, in eastern Poland. Its seat is the village of Pokrówka, which lies approximately 500 metres (0.31 mi) south-west of border Chełm and 73 km (45 mi) east of the regional capital Lublin.

The gmina covers an area of 221.82 square kilometres (85.6 sq mi), and as of 2014 its total population is 14,146 and is one of the largest municipalities of Lublin Voivodeship.

The gmina contains part of the protected area called Chełm Landscape Park.

== History ==
The municipality was formally established pursuant to the Resolution of the Provincial Council in Lublin of 5 December 1972 (effective as of 1 January 1973). Its shape resembled the 19th century Commune of Chełm. Later transformed into the Commune of Krzywiczki (with its seat in Pokrówka since the intervening period). Municipality of Chełm lies within two geographical regions, Volhynian Polesie and Lublin Upland.

== Architectural monuments ==
- The tower in the Stołpie from the end of the 12th century
- The Roman Catholic All Saints Church in Depułtycze Nowe
- The Jesus Christ Lord Saviour Parish Church
- The Palace and park complex in Srebrzyszcze from 17th century
- An Inn in Nowosiółki-Kolonia
- The old mill in Uher

== Environmental protection ==
The Municipality of Chełm has a natural environment characterized by the Chełm Hills, forest complexes and wetlands. There are several nature reserves:

- The Nature reserve “Stawska Góra” with a scenic hill “Virgin Mountain”
- The Nature reserve “Bagno Serebryskie”
- The Nature reserve “Brzeźno”
- The Nature reserve “”Torfowisko Sobowice”

A natural monument:

- “Virgin Mountain” with the oaks in Horodyszcze-Kolonia (date of creation: 28.01.1983) an area of 1,54 ha
- Horse-chestnut (Aesculus hippocastanum) in Depułtycze Nowe (date of creation: 13.11.1987)
- Pedunculate oak (Quercus robur) in Depułtycze Nowe (date of creation: 13.11.1987)
- Small-leaved Lime (Tilia cordata) in Staw (date of creation: 13.11.1987)
- Small-leaved Lime (Tilia cordata) in Staw (date of creation: 13.11.1987)
- Three European larches (Larix decidua) in Stańków (date of creation: 13.11.1987)
- River source with niche in Nowosiółki-Kolonia (date of creation: 31.07.1992)an area of 4 a
- Lathyrus laevigatus in Rudka (date of creation: 10.11.1998) an area of 2 ha

== Villages ==
Gmina Chełm contains the villages and settlements of Antonin, Depułtycze Królewskie, Depułtycze Królewskie-Kolonia, Henrysin, Horodyszcze, Horodyszcze-Kolonia, Janów, Józefin, Koza-Gotówka, Krzywice, Krzywice-Kolonia, Nowe Depułtycze, Nowiny, Nowosiółki, Nowosiółki-Kolonia, Ochoża-Kolonia, Okszów, Okszów-Kolonia, Parypse, Podgórze, Pokrówka, Rożdżałów, Rożdżałów-Kolonia, Rudka, Srebrzyszcze, Stańków, Stare Depułtycze, Staw, Stołpie, Strupin Duży, Strupin Łanowy, Strupin Mały, Tytusin, Uher, Weremowice, Wojniaki, Wólka Czułczycka, Zagroda, Zarzecze, Zawadówka, Żółtańce and Żółtańce-Kolonia.

== Neighbouring gminas ==
Gmina Chełm is bordered by the city of Chełm and by the gminas of Dorohusk, Kamień, Leśniowice, Rejowiec, Ruda-Huta, Sawin, Siedliszcze, Siennica Różana and Wierzbica.
