= Leśniowice =

- Village
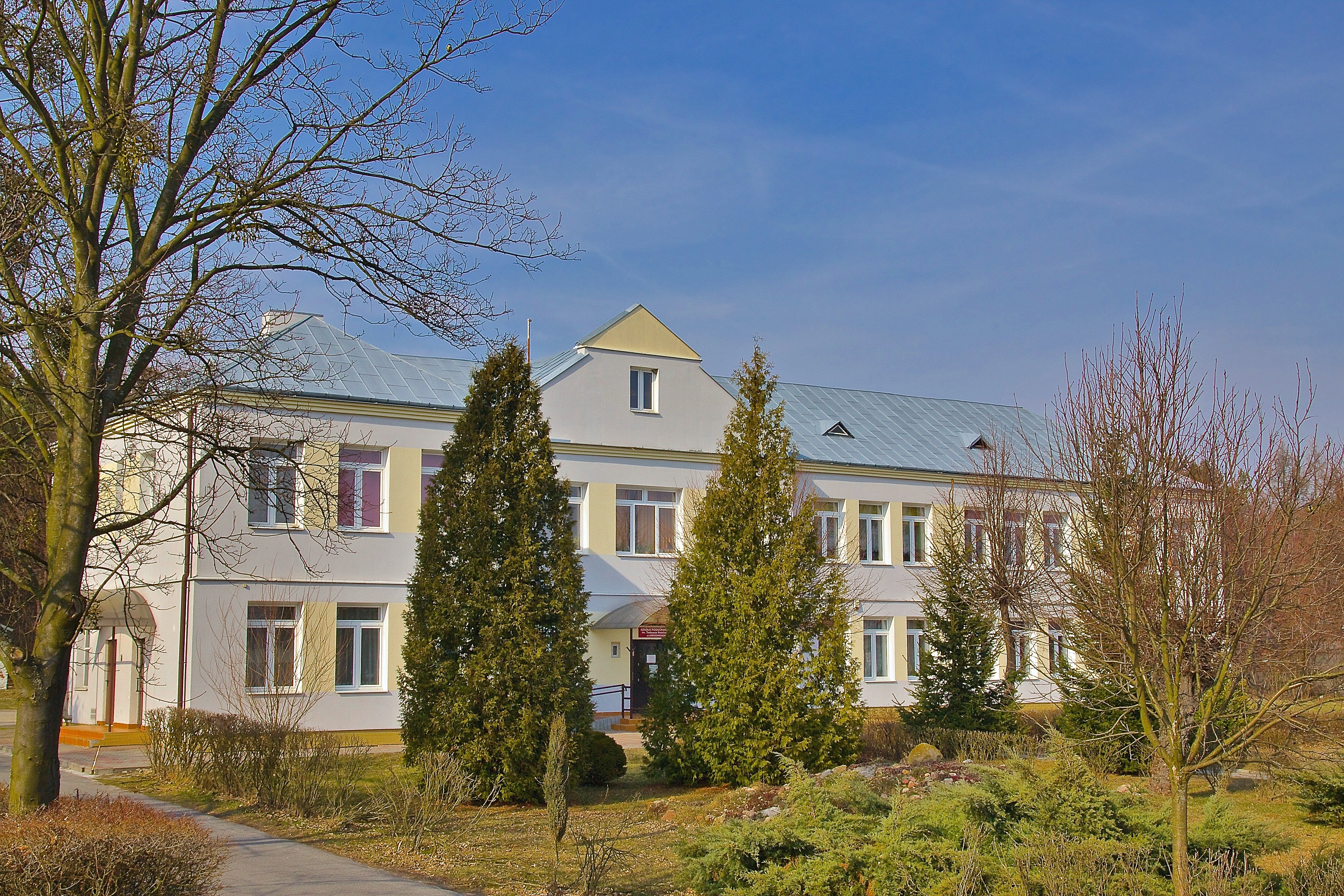

- Location within Poland
- Coordinates: 50°59′N 23°29′E
- Country: Poland
- Voivodeship: Lublin
- County: Chełm
- Gmina: Leśniowice

Population
  - Total: 358

Leśniowice [lɛɕɲɔˈvit͡sɛ] is a village in Chełm County, Lublin Voivodeship, in eastern Poland. It is the seat of the gmina (administrative district) called Gmina Leśniowice.
