= Chełm Landscape Park =

Protected area in Poland

Coordinates: 51.2125°N 23.5175°E

- Chełmski Park Krajobrazowy
- IUCN category V (protected landscape/seascape)
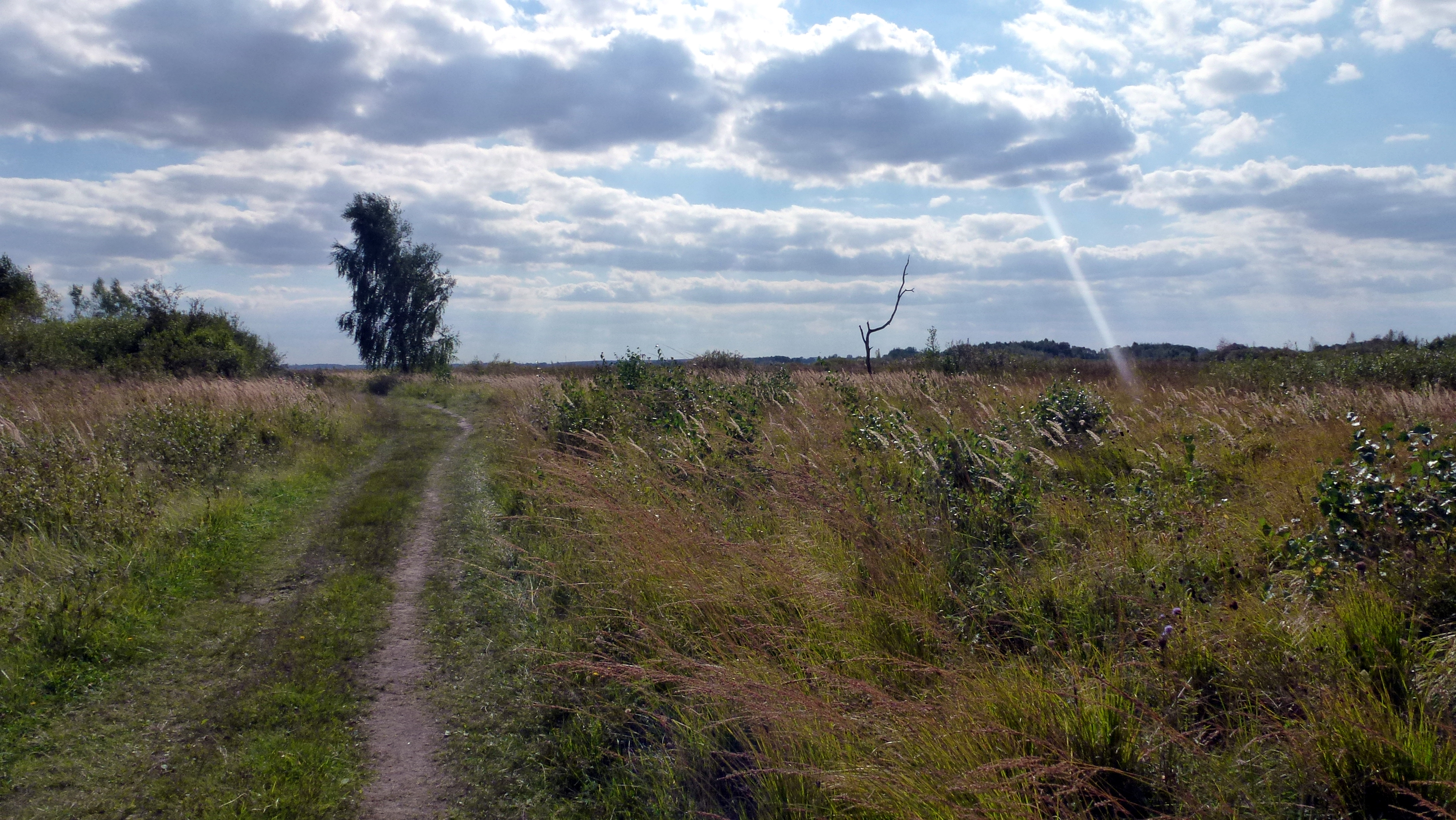
- Bagno Serebryskie Nature Reserve
- Interactive map of Chełm Landscape Park
- Location: Lublin Voivodeship
- Area: 143.50 km^{2} (55.41 sq mi)
- Established: 1983

Chełm Landscape Park (Chełmski Park Krajobrazowy) is a protected area (Landscape Park) in eastern Poland, established in 1983, covering an area of 143.50 square kilometres (55.41 sq mi). The Park lies within Lublin Voivodeship, in Chełm County (Gmina Chełm, Gmina Dorohusk).

There is a large amount of carbon and limestone in the soil and the area is covered with peat-bogs. There are 152 bird species such as black stork, common crane, lesser spotted eagle, aquatic warbler, short-eared owl, Eurasian curlew, whilst reptiles include the European pond turtle. The other three nature reserves located around the area are: Bachus (established in 1958), Brzeźno (1973) and Bagno Serebryjskie (1991).

== Purpose of creation ==
The purpose of establishing the park was to protect valuable forest and peat ecosystems rich in rare and protected species of plants and animals. The specific features of the plant cover are conditioned by the abundance of calcium carbonate in the substrate. Within the park's range there are valuable, slightly transformed forest complexes with a great wealth of biotypes (coniferous, oak-hornbeam and riparian habitats with many rare plants). The vicinity of Chełm is a place of occurrence of carbonate bogs, unique in the scale of the country, with the dominant rush of the log. There are communities of rare species of sedges on the outskirts of the settlements. Other rare plants include the following: pheasant's eye, steppe cherry, star gentian, military orchid and European Michaelmas daisy.
