= Gmina Ruda-Huta =

Gmina Ruda-Huta Ruda-Huta Commune
- Gmina
- Coat of arms
- Interactive map of Gmina Ruda-Huta
- Coordinates (Ruda-Huta): 51°14′N 23°34′E
- Country: Poland
- Voivodeship: Lublin
- County: Chełm County
- Seat: Ruda-Huta

Area
  - Total: 112.48 km^{2} (43.43 sq mi)

Population (2006)
  - Total: 4,813
  - Density: 42.79/km^{2} (110.8/sq mi)
- Website: http://www.ruda-huta.lubelskie.pl/

Gmina Ruda-Huta is a rural gmina (administrative district) in Chełm County, Lublin Voivodeship, in eastern Poland, on the border with Ukraine. Its seat is the village of Ruda-Huta, which lies approximately 11 kilometres (7 mi) north-east of Chełm and 70 km (43 mi) east of the regional capital Lublin.

The gmina covers an area of 112.48 square kilometres (43.4 sq mi), and as of 2006 its total population is 4,813.

== Villages ==
Gmina Ruda-Huta contains the villages and settlements of Chromówka, Dobryłów, Gdola, Gotówka, Hniszów, Jazików, Karolinów, Leśniczówka, Poczekajka, Ruda, Ruda-Huta, Ruda-Opalin, Rudka, Żalin and Zarudnia.

== Neighbouring gminas ==
Gmina Ruda-Huta is bordered by the gminas of Chełm, Dorohusk, Sawin and Wola Uhruska. It also borders Ukraine.
