= Srebrzyszcze =

- Village
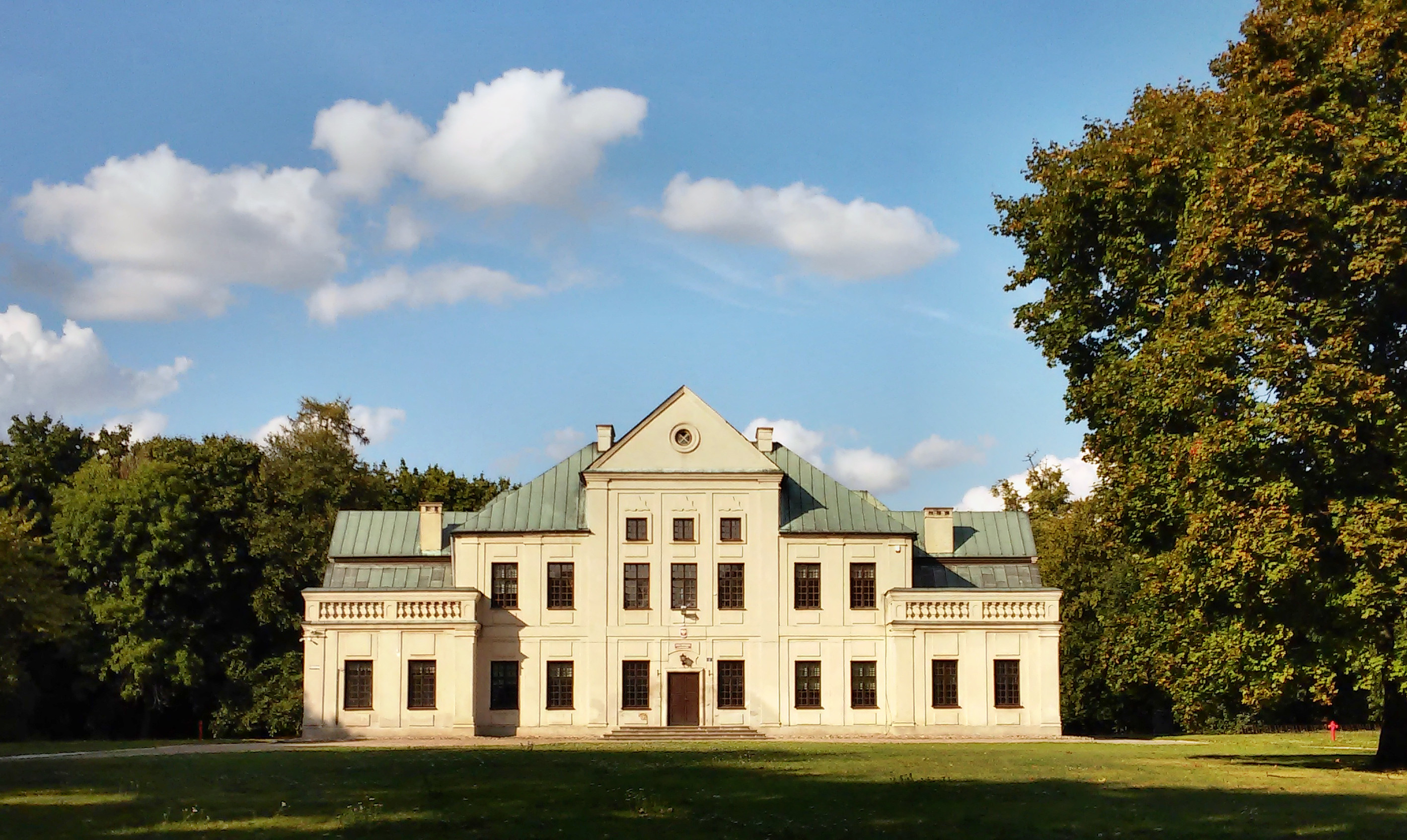
- Srebrzyszcze Palace Complex

- Location within Poland
- Coordinates: 51°09′01″N 23°32′22″E
- Country: Poland
- Voivodeship: Lublin
- County: Chełm
- Gmina: Chełm

Srebrzyszcze [srɛˈbʐɨʂt͡ʂɛ] is a village in the administrative district of Gmina Chełm, within Chełm County, Lublin Voivodeship, in eastern Poland.
