= Kamień, Chełm County =

Kamień
- Village
- Location within Poland
- Coordinates: 51°5′39″N 23°34′59″E
- Country: Poland
- Voivodeship: Lublin
- County: Chełm
- Gmina: Kamień

Population
  - Total: 870
- Website: http://www.kamien.lubelskie.pl/

Kamień (Polish pronunciation: [ˈkamjɛj̃]) is a village in Chełm County, Lublin Voivodeship, in eastern Poland. It is the seat of the gmina (administrative district) called Gmina Kamień.
