= Gmina Leśniowice =

Gmina Leśniowice Leśniowice Commune
- Gmina
- Coat of arms

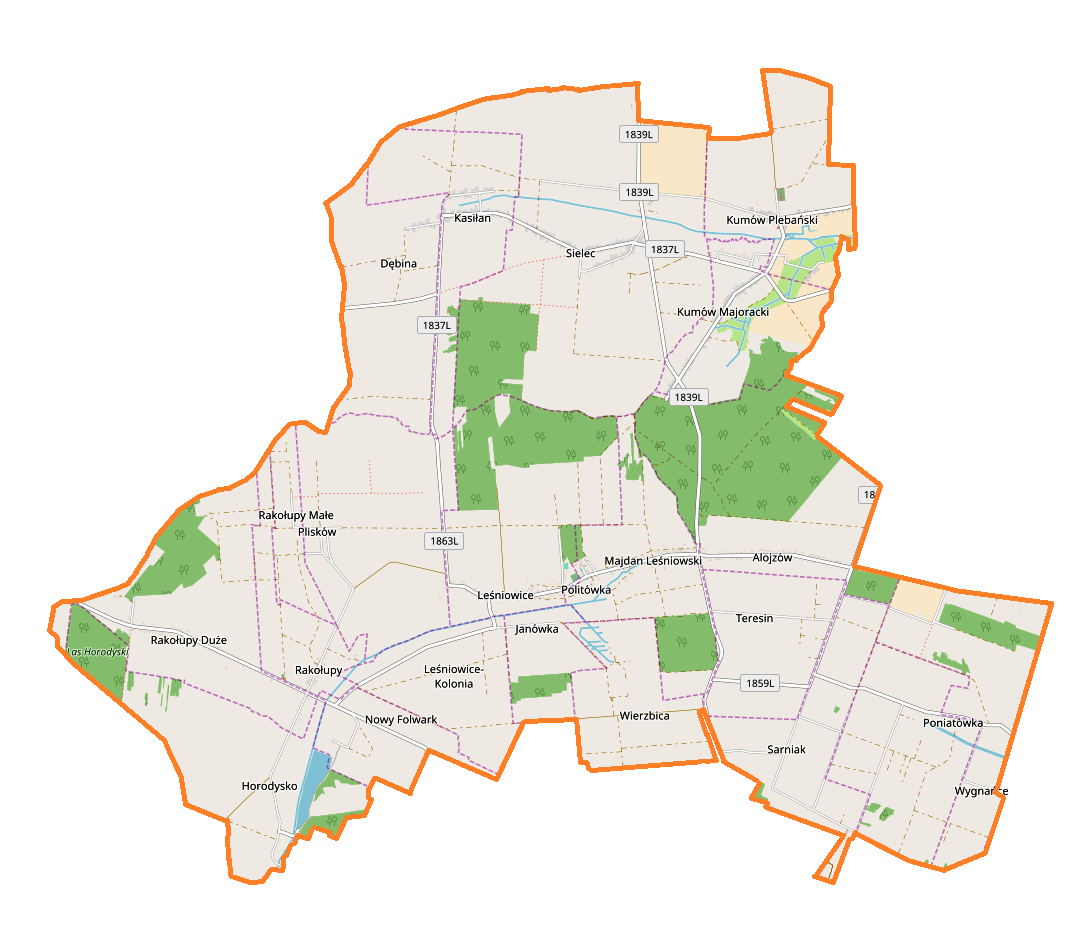

- Location within Poland
- Coordinates (Leśniowice): 50°59′N 23°29′E
- Country: Poland
- Voivodeship: Lublin
- County: Chełm County
- Seat: Leśniowice

Area
  - Total: 117.85 km^{2} (45.50 sq mi)

Population (2006)
  - Total: 3,996
  - Density: 33.91/km^{2} (87.82/sq mi)
- Website: http://www.lesniowice.lubelskie.pl

Gmina Leśniowice is a rural gmina (administrative district) in Chełm County, Lublin Voivodeship, in eastern Poland. Its seat is the village of Leśniowice, which lies approximately 19 kilometres (12 mi) south of Chełm and 71 km (44 mi) south-east of the regional capital Lublin.

The gmina covers an area of 117.85 square kilometres (45.5 sq mi), and as of 2006 its total population is 3,996.

== Villages ==
Gmina Leśniowice contains the villages and settlements of Alojzów, Dębina, Horodysko, Janówka, Kasiłan, Kumów Majoracki, Kumów Plebański, Leśniowice, Leśniowice-Kolonia, Majdan Leśniowski, Nowy Folwark, Plisków, Plisków-Kolonia, Politówka, Poniatówka, Rakołupy, Rakołupy Duże, Rakołupy Małe, Sarniak, Sielec, Teresin, Wierzbica and Wygnańce.

== Neighbouring gminas ==
Gmina Leśniowice is bordered by the gminas of Chełm, Kamień, Kraśniczyn, Siennica Różana, Wojsławice and Żmudź.
