= Ruda-Huta =

- Village
- Interactive map of Ruda-Huta
- Location within Poland
- Coordinates: 51°14′N 23°34′E
- Country: Poland
- Voivodeship: Lublin
- County: Chełm
- Gmina: Ruda-Huta

Population
  - Total: 1,076

Ruda-Huta [ˈruda ˈxuta] is a village in Chełm County, Lublin Voivodeship, in eastern Poland, close to the border with Ukraine. It is the seat of the gmina (administrative district) called Gmina Ruda-Huta.
