= Pokrówka =

- Village
- Location within Poland
- Coordinates: 51°6′N 23°27′E
- Country: Poland
- Voivodeship: Lublin
- County: Chełm
- Gmina: Chełm

Population
  - Total: 1,594
- Time zone: UTC+1 (CET)
  - Summer (DST): UTC+2 (CEST)
- Vehicle registration: LCH

Pokrówka [pɔˈkrufka] is a village in Chełm County, Lublin Voivodeship, in eastern Poland. It is the seat of the gmina (administrative district) called Gmina Chełm.
