= Czerniejów, Chełm County =

Czerniejów
- Village
- Location within Poland
- Coordinates: 51°5′3″N 23°37′39″E
- Country: Poland
- Voivodeship: Lublin
- County: Chełm
- Gmina: Kamień

Czerniejów [t͡ʂɛrˈɲɛjuf] is a village in the administrative district of Gmina Kamień, within Chełm County, Lublin Voivodeship, in eastern Poland.
