= Battle of Depułtycze =

- Part of the January Uprising
Date	5 August 1863
Location	near Depułtycze Królewskie
Result	Polish victory

Belligerents
(Poland) Polish insurgents	Russian Empire

Commanders and leaders
Kajetan Karol Cieszkowski; Władysław Eminowicz; Józef Władysław Rucki	

Casualties and losses
11 dead	23 dead

The Battle of Depułtycze, one of many clashes of the January Uprising, took place on August 5, 1863, near the village of Depułtycze Królewskie, which at that time belonged to Russian-controlled Congress Poland. A Polish insurgent unit clashed with a detachment of the Imperial Russian Army, which was sent there from Krasnystaw. The battle began at 10:30 a.m., and lasted several hours, ending in Polish victory. The insurgents lost 11 men, while Russian losses were 23 killed.

== Sources ==
- Stefan Kieniewicz: Powstanie styczniowe. Warszawa: Państwowe Wydawnictwo Naukowe, 1983. ISBN 83-01-03652-4.
