= Chełm County =

Chełm County Powiat chełmski
- County
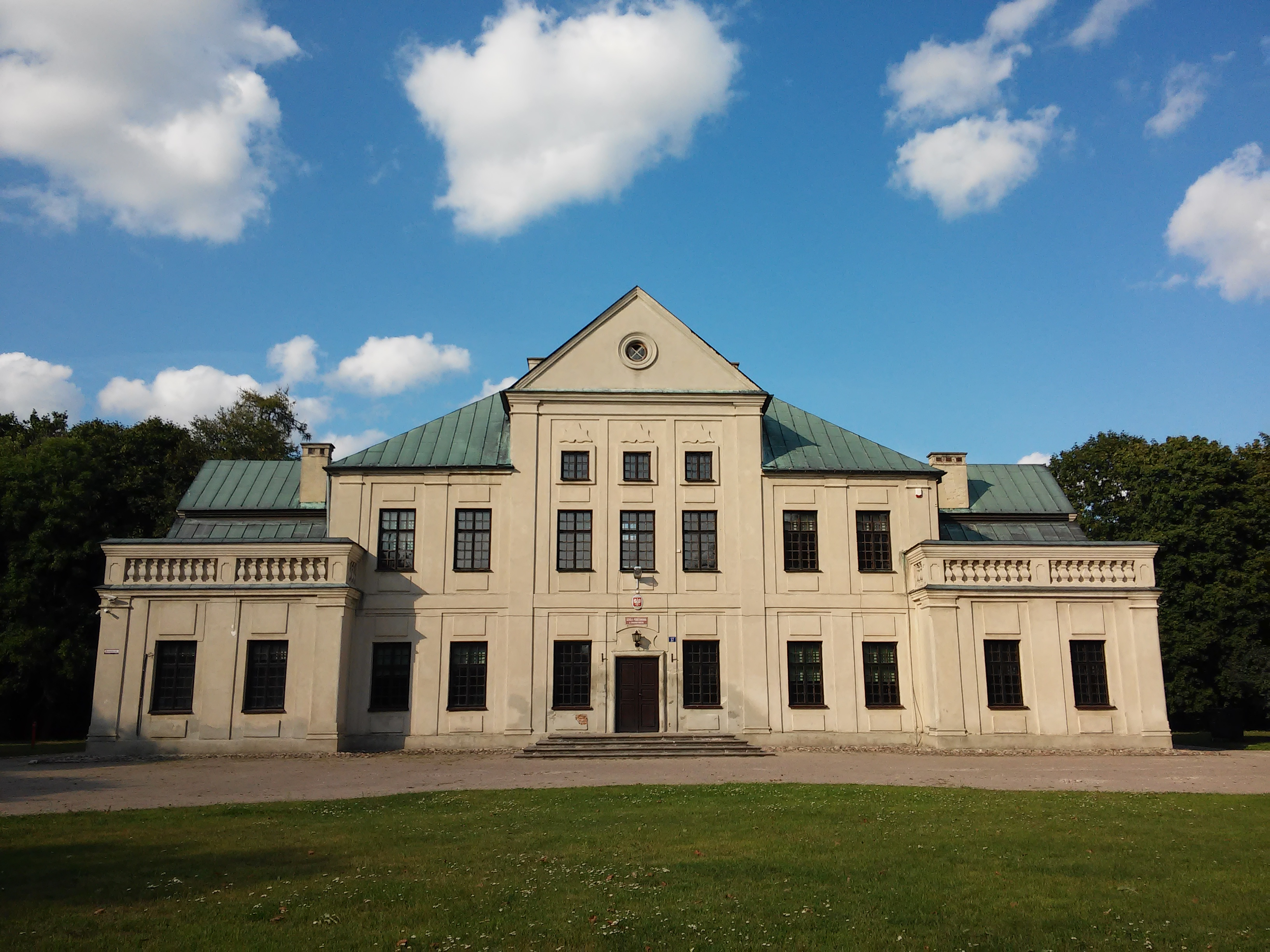
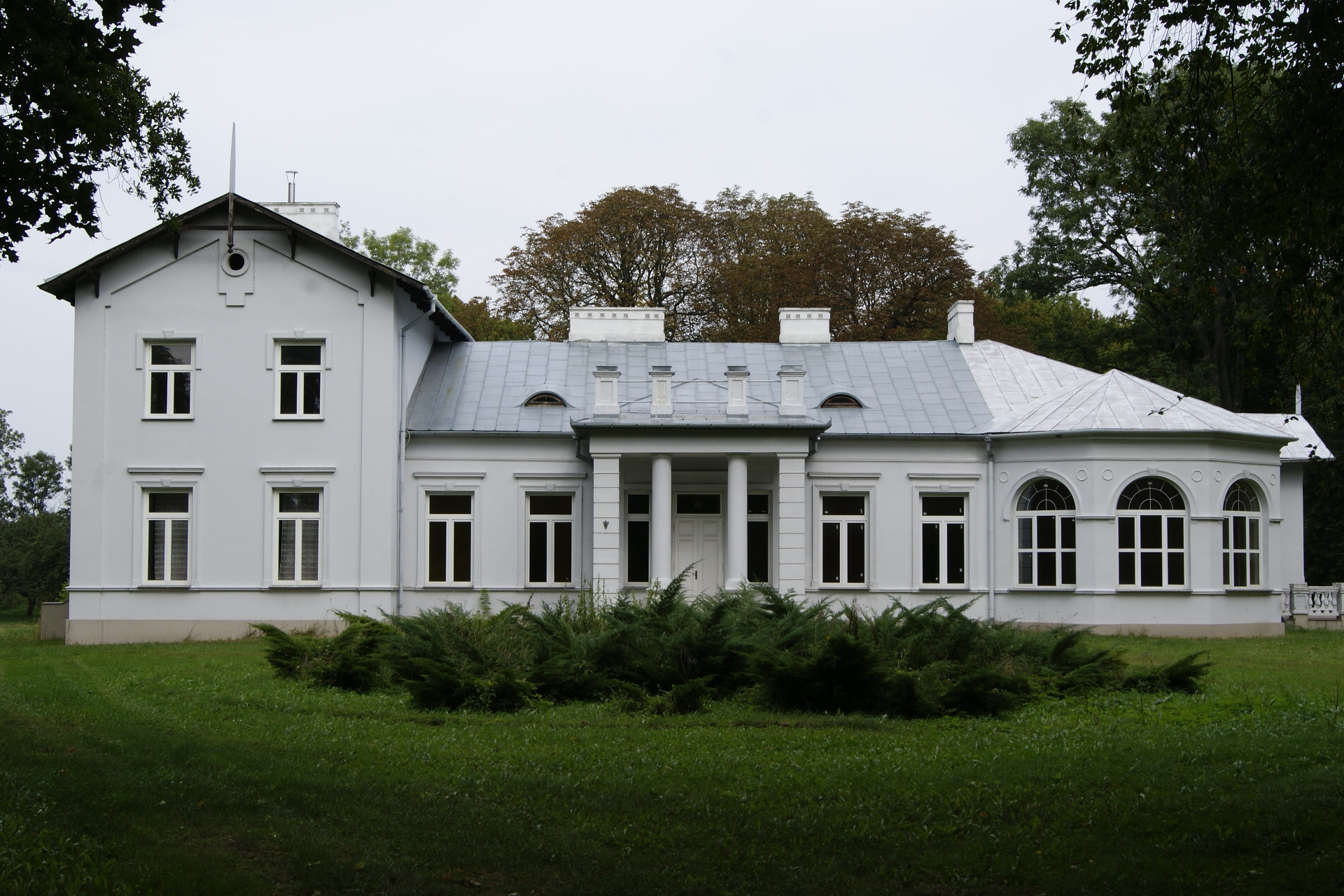
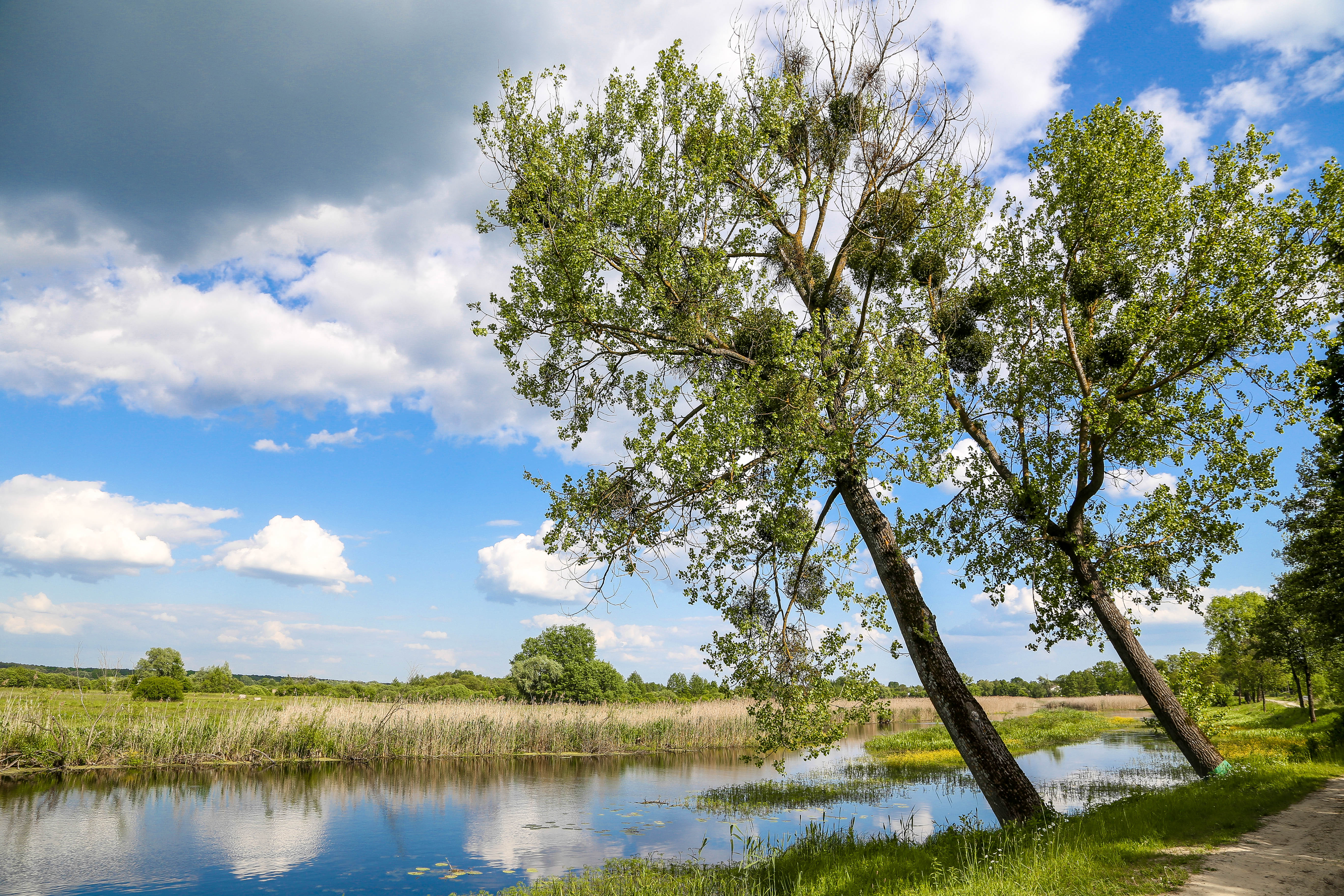
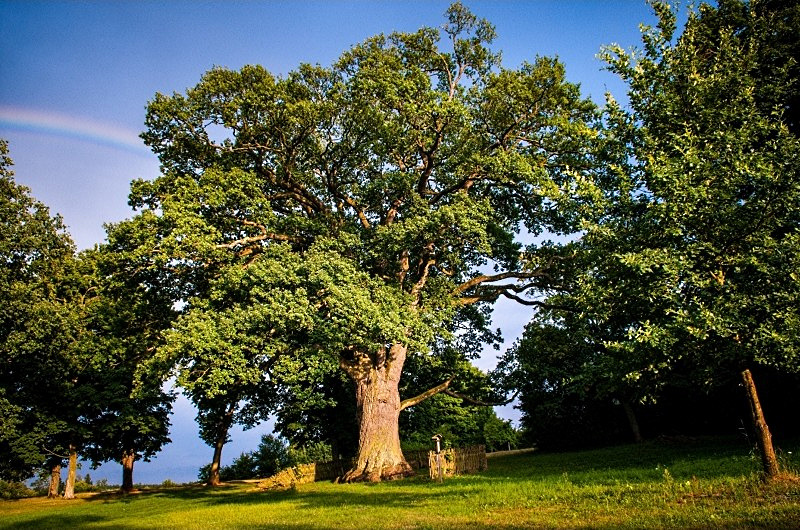
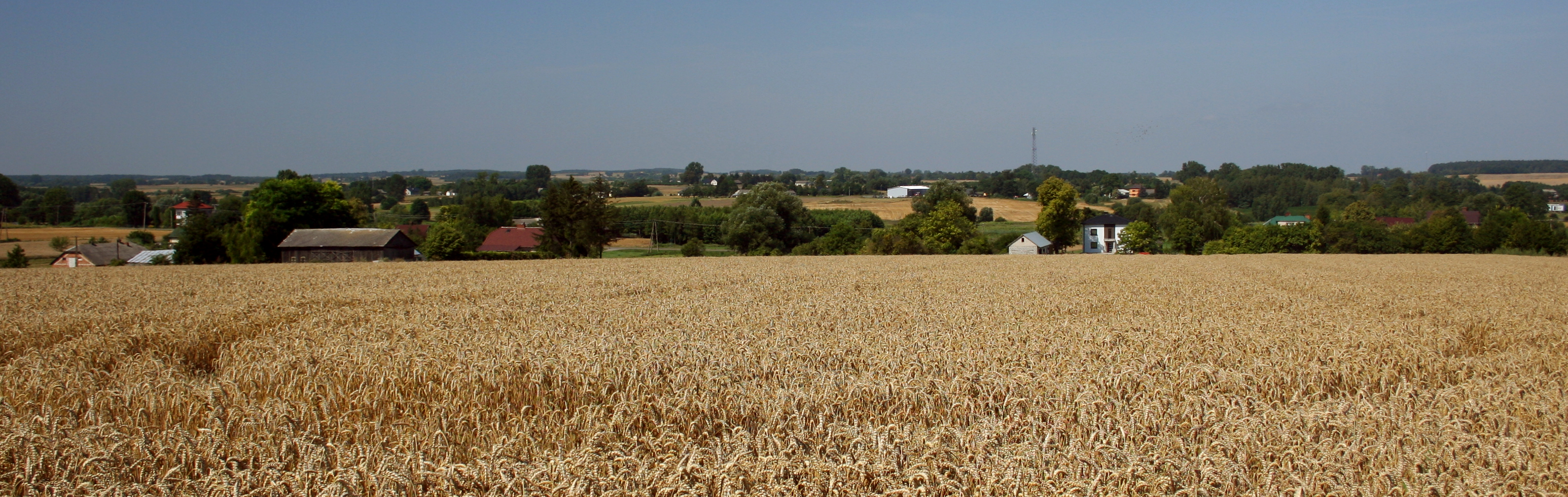
- Srebrzyszcze Palace Manor in Kulik Old riverbed of the Bug Bolko Oak in Hniszów Countryside in Henrysin

- Flag Coat of arms

- Location within the voivodeship
- Coordinates (Chełm): 51°9′N 23°29′E
- Country: Poland
- Voivodeship: Lublin
- Seat: Chełm
- Gminas: Total 15 (incl. 1 urban): Rejowiec Fabryczny; Gmina Białopole; Gmina Chełm; Gmina Dorohusk; Gmina Dubienka; Gmina Kamień; Gmina Leśniowice; Gmina Rejowiec; Gmina Rejowiec Fabryczny; Gmina Ruda-Huta; Gmina Sawin; Gmina Siedliszcze; Gmina Wierzbica; Gmina Wojsławice; Gmina Żmudź

Area
  - Total: 1,779.64 km^{2} (687.12 sq mi)

Population (2019)
  - Total: 74,595
  - Density: 41.916/km^{2} (108.56/sq mi)
  - Urban: 4,406
  - Rural: 70,189
- Time zone: UTC+1 (CET)
  - Summer (DST): UTC+2 (CEST)
- Car plates: LCH
- Website: www.powiat.chelm.pl

Chełm County (Polish: powiat chełmski) is a unit of territorial administration and local government (powiat) in Lublin Voivodeship, eastern Poland, on the border with Ukraine. It was established on January 1, 1999, as a result of the Polish local government reforms passed in 1998. Its administrative seat is the city of Chełm, although the city is not part of the county (it constitutes a separate city county). Towns in Chełm County are Rejowiec, Rejowiec Fabryczny and Siedliszcze.

The county covers an area of 1,779.64 square kilometres (687.1 sq mi). As of 2006, its total population is 74,595, out of which the population of Rejowiec Fabryczny is 4,406 and the rural population is 70,189.

The emblem and flag of Chełm county was designed by Dr. Krzysztof Skupieński, a history teacher. The emblem harkens back to the old emblem of historical Chełm, which itself recounts the traditional folk tale of the great northern bear. She can be seen, coated in silver, as she travels across the green fields of Chełm and its mythical golden oaks.

The county includes part of the protected area called Chełm Landscape Park.

== Neighbouring counties ==
Apart from the city of Chełm, Chełm County is also bordered by Hrubieszów County to the south-east, Zamość County to the south, Krasnystaw County to the south-west, Świdnik County and Łęczna County to the west, and Włodawa County to the north. It also borders Ukraine to the east.

== Administrative divisions ==
The county is subdivided into 15 gminas (one urban, two urban-rural and 12 rural). These are listed in the following table, in descending order of population. (Gmina Rejowiec belonged to Krasnystaw County until 2006.)

Gmina	Type	Area (km^{2})	Population (2019)	Seat
Gmina Chełm	rural	221.8	14,866	Pokrówka
Gmina Dorohusk	rural	192.4	6,409	Dorohusk
Gmina Sawin	rural	190.2	5,457	Sawin
Gmina Siedliszcze	urban-rural	153.9	5,408	Siedliszcze
Gmina Wierzbica	rural	146.4	5,104	Wierzbica
Gmina Ruda-Huta	rural	112.5	4,520	Ruda-Huta
Rejowiec Fabryczny	urban	14.3	4,406	
Gmina Rejowiec	urban-rural	106.3	4,331	Rejowiec
Gmina Rejowiec Fabryczny	rural	87.5	4,231	Rejowiec Fabryczny *
Gmina Kamień	rural	96.9	4,171	Kamień
Gmina Wojsławice	rural	110.2	3,769	Wojsławice
Gmina Leśniowice	rural	117.9	3,598	Leśniowice
Gmina Żmudź	rural	135.8	3,089	Żmudź
Gmina Białopole	rural	103.6	2,901	Białopole
Gmina Dubienka	rural	96.3	2,335	Dubienka
* seat not part of the gmina

== Government ==
The Chełm County Council has 19 elected members, one of whom is the Starosta. As of 2018, the Starosta is Piotr Deniszczuk. In the Sejm, the county is part of the Chełm constituency.
