= Gorodishche =

Gorodishche may refer to:

- Gorodishche, Russia, several inhabited localities in Russia
- Russian name for Haradzishcha - placenames in Belarus
- Russian name for "Horodiște", several inhabited localities in Moldova
- Russian name for "Horodyshche", several inhabited localities in Ukraine

== See also ==
- Horodyszcze (disambiguation) (Ukrainian spelling written in Polish) - placenames in Poland (nearby Ukraine) with this name
- Grodziszcze (disambiguation) (proper Polish spelling) - related placenames in Poland
- Hradiště (disambiguation) - placenames in Czech republic and Slovakia
- Grădiştea (disambiguation) (Romanian form) - placenames in Romania
- Gradište (disambiguation) - placenames in Serbia, Croatia and Macedonia
- Gorodishchensky
