= Hradiště =

Hradiště or Hradište (meaning "gord") may refer to places:

== Places ==
=== Czech Republic ===
- Hradiště (Benešov District), a municipality and village in the Central Bohemian Region
- Hradiště (Domažlice District), a municipality and village in the Plzeň Region
- Hradiště (Plzeň-South District), a municipality and village in the Plzeň Region
- Hradiště (Rokycany District), a municipality and village in the Plzeň Region
- Hradiště, a village and part of Blovice in the Plzeň Region
- Hradiště, a village and part of Bžany (Teplice District) in the Ústí nad Labem Region
- Hradiště, a village and part of České Lhotice in the Pardubice Region
- Hradiště, a part of Cheb in the Karlovy Vary Region
- Hradiště, a hamlet and part of Chlum (Česká Lípa District) in the Liberec Region
- Hradiště, a village and part of Kaplice in the South Bohemian Region
- Hradiště, a village and part of Klášterec nad Ohří in the Ústí nad Labem Region
- Hradiště, a village and part of Koldín in the Pardubice Region
- Hradiště, a village and part of Kolinec in the Plzeň Region
- Hradiště, a village and part of Malovice in the South Bohemian Region
- Hradiště, a village and part of Nová Bystřice in the South Bohemian Region
- Hradiště, a part of Písek in the South Bohemian Region
- Hradiště, a part of Plzeň in the Plzeň Region
- Hradiště, a village and part of Postoloprty in the Moravian-Silesian Region
- Hradiště (Těrlicko), a village and part of Těrlicko in the Moravian-Silesian Region
- Hradiště, a military training area in the Karlovy Vary Region
- Choustníkovo Hradiště, a market town in the Hradec Králové Region
- Dolní Hradiště, a municipality and village in the Plzeň Region
- Klášter Hradiště nad Jizerou, a municipality and village in the Central Bohemian Region
- Mnichovo Hradiště, a town in the Central Bohemian Region
- Staré Hradiště, a municipality and village in the Pardubice Region
- Uherské Hradiště, a town in the Zlín Region

=== Slovakia ===
- Hradište, Banská Bystrica, a municipality and village in the Banská Bystrica Region
- Hradište, Partizánske District, a municipality and village in the Trenčín Region
- Hradište, Poltár District, a municipality and village in the Banská Bystrica Region
- Hradište pod Vrátnom, a municipality and village in the Trnava Region

== See also ==
- Hradištko (disambiguation) (diminutive form)
- Gradište (disambiguation) (South-Slavic form)
- Horodyshche (Ukrainian form)
- Gorodishche, Russia (Russian form)
- Grădiştea (disambiguation) (Romanian form)
- Grodziszcze (disambiguation) (Polish form)
