= Horodyshche (disambiguation) =

There are 35 placenames and 1 district in Ukraine called Horodyshche (Ukrainian: Городище). This widely popular placename stems from old Ukrainian word horod, which means a fortified town, settlement but also can mean a garden in modern Ukrainian, depending on the stress of the syllable.

Among these:

- Horodyshche - city in Cherkasy Oblast of central Ukraine, formerly the administrative center of Horodyshche Raion
- Horodyshche, Alchevsk Raion, Luhansk Oblast - urban-type settlement in Perevalsk Raion of Luhansk Oblast
- Horodyshche, Bilovodsk settlement hromada, Starobilsk Raion, Luhansk Oblast - village in Starobilsk Raion of Luhansk Oblast
- Horodyshche, Markivka settlement hromada, Starobilsk Raion, Luhansk Oblast - village in Starobilsk Raion of Luhansk Oblast
- Horodyshche, Kozova settlement hromada, Ternopil Raion, Ternopil Oblast - village in Ternopil Raion of Ternopil Oblast of western Ukraine
- Horodyshche, Ternopil urban hromada, Ternopil Raion, Ternopil Oblast - village in Ternopil Raion of Ternopil Oblast of western Ukraine
- Horodyshche, Kivertsi Raion - village in Kivertsi raion of Volyn Oblast in western Ukraine
- Horodyshche, Kovel Raion - village in Kovel Raion of Volyn Oblast in western Ukraine
- Horodyshche, Lutsk Raion - village in Lutsk Raion of Volyn Oblast
- Horodyshche, Lityn Raion - village in Lityn Raion of Vinnytsia Oblast, western Ukraine
- Horodyshche, Stryi Raion - village in Stryi Raion of Lviv Oblast
- Horodyshche, Dubrovytsia Raion - village in Dubrovytsia Raion of Rivne Oblast
- Horodyshche is also former name of Hradyzk in Poltava Oblast, Ukraine
- Horodyshche (border checkpoint) - border checkpoint in Ukraine on the border with Belarus across from Verkhniy Trebezhov

== See also ==
- Horodyszcze (disambiguation) (Ukrainian spelling written in Polish) - placenames in Poland (nearby Ukraine) with this name
- Grodziszcze (disambiguation) (proper Polish spelling) - related placenames in Poland
- Gorodishche, Russia - placenames in Russia with this name
- Haradzishcha - placenames in Belarus with this name
- Horodişte (disambiguation) - four placenames in Moldova
- Hradiště (disambiguation) - placenames in Czech republic and Slovakia
- Grădiştea (disambiguation) (Romanian form) - placenames in Romania
- Gradište (disambiguation) - placenames in Serbia, Croatia and Macedonia
