= Gorodishche, Russia =

Gorodishche (Russian: Городи́ще) is the name of several inhabited localities in Russia.

== Belgorod Oblast ==
As of 2010, three rural localities in Belgorod Oblast bear this name:

- Gorodishche, Alexeyevsky District, Belgorod Oblast, a khutor in Alexeyevsky District
- Gorodishche, Korochansky District, Belgorod Oblast, a selo in Korochansky District
- Gorodishche, Starooskolsky District, Belgorod Oblast, a selo in Starooskolsky District

== Bryansk Oblast ==
As of 2010, one rural locality in Bryansk Oblast bears this name:

- Gorodishche, Bryansk Oblast, a selo in Gorodishchensky Selsoviet of Pogarsky District

== Chelyabinsk Oblast ==
As of 2010, one rural locality in Chelyabinsk Oblast bears this name:

- Gorodishche, Chelyabinsk Oblast, a selo in Krasnooktyabrsky Selsoviet of Varnensky District

== Ivanovo Oblast ==
As of 2010, one rural locality in Ivanovo Oblast bears this name:

- Gorodishche, Ivanovo Oblast, a village in Zavolzhsky District

== Kaluga Oblast ==
As of 2010, two rural localities in Kaluga Oblast bear this name:

- Gorodishche, Dzerzhinsky District, Kaluga Oblast, a village in Dzerzhinsky District
- Gorodishche, Meshchovsky District, Kaluga Oblast, a village in Meshchovsky District

== Kirov Oblast ==
As of 2010, three rural localities in Kirov Oblast bear this name:

- Gorodishche, Nemsky District, Kirov Oblast, a village in Gorodishchensky Rural Okrug of Nemsky District
- Gorodishche, Sanchursky District, Kirov Oblast, a selo in Gorodishchensky Rural Okrug of Sanchursky District
- Gorodishche, Zuyevsky District, Kirov Oblast, a village in Oktyabrsky Rural Okrug of Zuyevsky District

== Kostroma Oblast ==
As of 2010, two rural localities in Kostroma Oblast bear this name:

- Gorodishche, Kostromskoy District, Kostroma Oblast, a village in Kotovskoye Settlement of Kostromskoy District
- Gorodishche, Parfenyevsky District, Kostroma Oblast, a village in Matveyevskoye Settlement of Parfenyevsky District

== Krasnoyarsk Krai ==
As of 2010, one rural locality in Krasnoyarsk Krai bears this name:

- Gorodishche, Krasnoyarsk Krai, a selo in Gorodishchensky Selsoviet of Yeniseysky District

== Kursk Oblast ==
As of 2010, six rural localities in Kursk Oblast bear this name:

- Gorodishche, Dmitriyevsky District, Kursk Oblast, a village in Berezovsky Selsoviet of Dmitriyevsky District
- Gorodishche, Kursky District, Kursk Oblast, a village in Besedinsky Selsoviet of Kursky District
- Gorodishche, Ponyrovsky District, Kursk Oblast, a village in 2-y Ponyrovsky Selsoviet of Ponyrovsky District
- Gorodishche, Kozinsky Selsoviet, Rylsky District, Kursk Oblast, a village in Kozinsky Selsoviet of Rylsky District
- Gorodishche, Nikolnikovsky Selsoviet, Rylsky District, Kursk Oblast, a khutor in Nikolnikovsky Selsoviet of Rylsky District
- Gorodishche, Sovetsky District, Kursk Oblast, a village in Gorodishchensky Selsoviet of Sovetsky District

== Leningrad Oblast ==
As of 2010, four rural localities in Leningrad Oblast bear this name:

- Gorodishche, Kirishsky District, Leningrad Oblast, a village in Pchevskoye Settlement Municipal Formation of Kirishsky District
- Gorodishche, Kirovsky District, Leningrad Oblast, a village under the administrative jurisdiction of Naziyevskoye Settlement Municipal Formation of Kirovsky District
- Gorodishche, Melegezhskoye Settlement Municipal Formation, Tikhvinsky District, Leningrad Oblast, a village in Melegezhskoye Settlement Municipal Formation of Tikhvinsky District
- Gorodishche, Tsvylevskoye Settlement Municipal Formation, Tikhvinsky District, Leningrad Oblast, a village in Tsvylevskoye Settlement Municipal Formation of Tikhvinsky District

== Moscow Oblast ==
As of 2010, eleven rural localities in Moscow Oblast bear this name:

- Gorodishche, Chekhovsky District, Moscow Oblast, a village in Stremilovskoye Rural Settlement of Chekhovsky District
- Gorodishche, Klinsky District, Moscow Oblast, a village in Petrovskoye Rural Settlement of Klinsky District
- Gorodishche, Leninsky District, Moscow Oblast, a village in Voskresenskoye Rural Settlement of Leninsky District
- Gorodishche, Gazoprovodskoye Rural Settlement, Lukhovitsky District, Moscow Oblast, a village in Gazoprovodskoye Rural Settlement of Lukhovitsky District
- Gorodishche, Golovachevskoye Rural Settlement, Lukhovitsky District, Moscow Oblast, a village in Golovachevskoye Rural Settlement of Lukhovitsky District
- Gorodishche, Volkovskoye Rural Settlement, Ruzsky District, Moscow Oblast, a village in Volkovskoye Rural Settlement of Ruzsky District
- Gorodishche, Volkovskoye Rural Settlement, Ruzsky District, Moscow Oblast, a village in Volkovskoye Rural Settlement of Ruzsky District
- Gorodishche, Volkovskoye Rural Settlement, Ruzsky District, Moscow Oblast, a village in Volkovskoye Rural Settlement of Ruzsky District
- Gorodishche, Shakhovskoy District, Moscow Oblast, a village in Seredinskoye Rural Settlement of Shakhovskoy District
- Gorodishche, Stupinsky District, Moscow Oblast, a village under the administrative jurisdiction of the Town of Stupino in Stupinsky District
- Gorodishche, Voskresensky District, Moscow Oblast, a village in Fedinskoye Rural Settlement of Voskresensky District

== Novgorod Oblast ==
As of 2010, three rural localities in Novgorod Oblast bear this name:

- Gorodishche, Shimsky District, Novgorod Oblast, a village in Utorgoshskoye Settlement of Shimsky District
- Gorodishche, Soletsky District, Novgorod Oblast, a village in Gorskoye Settlement of Soletsky District
- Gorodishche, Volotovsky District, Novgorod Oblast, a village in Slavitinskoye Settlement of Volotovsky District

== Novosibirsk Oblast ==
As of 2010, one rural locality in Novosibirsk Oblast bears this name:

- Gorodishche, Novosibirsk Oblast, a village in Zdvinsky District

== Orenburg Oblast ==
As of 2010, one rural locality in Orenburg Oblast bears this name:

- Gorodishche, Orenburg Oblast, a selo in Gorodishchensky Selsoviet of Orenburg

== Oryol Oblast ==
As of 2010, seven rural localities in Oryol Oblast bear this name:

- Gorodishche, Bolkhovsky District, Oryol Oblast, a selo in Bagrinovsky Selsoviet of Bolkhovsky District
- Gorodishche, Bashkatovsky Selsoviet, Mtsensky District, Oryol Oblast, a village in Bashkatovsky Selsoviet of Mtsensky District
- Gorodishche, Telchensky Selsoviet, Mtsensky District, Oryol Oblast, a village in Telchensky Selsoviet of Mtsensky District
- Gorodishche, Soskovsky District, Oryol Oblast, a village in Kirovsky Selsoviet of Soskovsky District
- Gorodishche, Sverdlovsky District, Oryol Oblast, a village in Bogodukhovsky Selsoviet of Sverdlovsky District
- Gorodishche, Uritsky District, Oryol Oblast, a selo in Gorodishchensky Selsoviet of Uritsky District
- Gorodishche, Znamensky District, Oryol Oblast, a village in Znamensky Selsoviet of Znamensky District

== Penza Oblast ==
The following inhabited localities in Penza Oblast bear this name:

- Gorodishche, Gorodishchensky District, Penza Oblast, a town in Gorodishchensky District
- Gorodishche Urban Settlement, the municipal divisioin in which the town Gorodishche, Gorodishchensky District, Penza Oblast is incorporated
- Gorodishche, Mokshansky District, Penza Oblast, a settlement in Chernozersky Selsoviet of Mokshansky District
- Gorodishche, Zemetchinsky District, Penza Oblast, a settlement in Kirillovsky Selsoviet of Zemetchinsky District

== Perm Krai ==
As of 2010, seven rural localities in Perm Krai bear this name:

- Gorodishche, Dobryanka, Perm Krai, a village under the administrative jurisdiction of the city of Dobryanka
- Gorodishche, Osinsky District, Perm Krai, a village in Osinsky District
- Gorodishche, Solikamsky District, Perm Krai, a selo in Solikamsky District
- Gorodishche, Usolsky District, Perm Krai, a village in Usolsky District
- Gorodishche, Yelovsky District, Perm Krai, a village in Yelovsky District
- Gorodishche (Pozhvinskoye Rural Settlement), Yusvinsky District, Perm Krai, a village in Yusvinsky District; municipally, a part of Pozhvinskoye Rural Settlement of that district
- Gorodishche (Maykorskoye Rural Settlement), Yusvinsky District, Perm Krai, a village in Yusvinsky District; municipally, a part of Maykorskoye Rural Settlement of that district

== Pskov Oblast ==
As of 2010, eleven rural localities in Pskov Oblast bear this name:

- Gorodishche, Bezhanitsky District, Pskov Oblast, a village in Bezhanitsky District
- Gorodishche, Dnovsky District, Pskov Oblast, a village in Dnovsky District
- Gorodishche (Artemovskaya Rural Settlement), Nevelsky District, Pskov Oblast, a village in Nevelsky District; municipally, a part of Artemovskaya Rural Settlement of that district
- Gorodishche (Plisskaya Rural Settlement), Nevelsky District, Pskov Oblast, a village in Nevelsky District; municipally, a part of Plisskaya Rural Settlement of that district
- Gorodishche, Novorzhevsky District, Pskov Oblast, a village in Novorzhevsky District
- Gorodishche, Ostrovsky District, Pskov Oblast, a village in Ostrovsky District
- Gorodishche, Palkinsky District, Pskov Oblast, a village in Palkinsky District
- Gorodishche, Pechorsky District, Pskov Oblast, a village in Pechorsky District
- Gorodishche, Pytalovsky District, Pskov Oblast, a village in Pytalovsky District
- Gorodishche (Cherpesskaya Rural Settlement), Velikoluksky District, Pskov Oblast, a village in Velikoluksky District; municipally, a part of Cherpesskaya Rural Settlement of that district
- Gorodishche (Lychevskaya Rural Settlement), Velikoluksky District, Pskov Oblast, a village in Velikoluksky District; municipally, a part of Lychevskaya Rural Settlement of that district

== Rostov Oblast ==
As of 2010, one rural locality in Rostov Oblast bears this name:

- Gorodishche, Rostov Oblast, a khutor in Yelizavetinskoye Rural Settlement of Azovsky District

== Ryazan Oblast ==
As of 2010, one rural locality in Ryazan Oblast bears this name:

- Gorodishche, Ryazan Oblast, a selo in Khodyninsky Rural Okrug of Rybnovsky District

== Smolensk Oblast ==
As of 2010, six rural localities in Smolensk Oblast bear this name:

- Gorodishche, Demidovsky District, Smolensk Oblast, a village in Vorobyevskoye Rural Settlement of Demidovsky District
- Gorodishche, Gagarinsky District, Smolensk Oblast, a village in Tokarevskoye Rural Settlement of Gagarinsky District
- Gorodishche, Khislavichsky District, Smolensk Oblast, a village in Gorodishchenskoye Rural Settlement of Khislavichsky District
- Gorodishche, Safonovsky District, Smolensk Oblast, a village in Bogdanovshchinskoye Rural Settlement of Safonovsky District
- Gorodishche, Ugransky District, Smolensk Oblast, a village in Mikhalevskoye Rural Settlement of Ugransky District
- Gorodishche, Velizhsky District, Smolensk Oblast, a village in Zaozerskoye Rural Settlement of Velizhsky District

== Tambov Oblast ==
As of 2010, one rural locality in Tambov Oblast bears this name:

- Gorodishche, Tambov Oblast, a selo in Krivopolyansky Selsoviet of Bondarsky District

== Republic of Tatarstan ==
As of 2010, three rural localities in the Republic of Tatarstan bear this name:

- Gorodishche, Drozhzhanovsky District, Republic of Tatarstan, a selo in Drozhzhanovsky District
- Gorodishche, Nizhnekamsky District, Republic of Tatarstan, a selo in Nizhnekamsky District
- Gorodishche, Zelenodolsky District, Republic of Tatarstan, a village in Zelenodolsky District

== Tver Oblast ==
As of 2010, eleven rural localities in Tver Oblast bear this name:

- Gorodishche (Emmausskoye Rural Settlement), Kalininsky District, Tver Oblast, a village in Kalininsky District; municipally, a part of Emmausskoye Rural Settlement of that district
- Gorodishche (Chernogubovskoye Rural Settlement), Kalininsky District, Tver Oblast, a village in Kalininsky District; municipally, a part of Chernogubovskoye Rural Settlement of that district
- Gorodishche, Kimrsky District, Tver Oblast, a village in Kimrsky District
- Gorodishche (Vakhoninskoye Rural Settlement), Konakovsky District, Tver Oblast, a village in Konakovsky District; municipally, a part of Vakhoninskoye Rural Settlement of that district
- Gorodishche (Pervomayskoye Rural Settlement), Konakovsky District, Tver Oblast, a village in Konakovsky District; municipally, a part of Pervomayskoye Rural Settlement of that district
- Gorodishche, Ostashkovsky District, Tver Oblast, a village in Ostashkovsky District
- Gorodishche, Rzhevsky District, Tver Oblast, a village in Rzhevsky District
- Gorodishche, Sandovsky District, Tver Oblast, a village in Sandovsky District
- Gorodishche, Selizharovsky District, Tver Oblast, a village in Selizharovsky District
- Gorodishche, Staritsky District, Tver Oblast, a village in Staritsky District
- Gorodishche, Udomelsky District, Tver Oblast, a village in Udomelsky District

== Tyumen Oblast ==
As of 2010, one rural locality in Tyumen Oblast bears this name:

- Gorodishche, Tyumen Oblast, a village in Sorokinsky District

== Vladimir Oblast ==
As of 2010, one rural locality in Vladimir Oblast bears this name:

- Gorodishche, Vladimir Oblast, a selo in Yuryev-Polsky District

== Volgograd Oblast ==
As of 2010, one urban locality in Volgograd Oblast bears this name:

- Gorodishche, Volgograd Oblast, a work settlement in Gorodishchensky District

== Vologda Oblast ==
As of 2010, four rural localities in Vologda Oblast bear this name:

- Gorodishche, Cherepovetsky District, Vologda Oblast, a village in Domozerovsky Selsoviet of Cherepovetsky District
- Gorodishche, Kichmengsko-Gorodetsky District, Vologda Oblast, a village in Kichmengsky Selsoviet of Kichmengsko-Gorodetsky District
- Gorodishche, Kirillovsky District, Vologda Oblast, a village in Migachevsky Selsoviet of Kirillovsky District
- Gorodishche, Vozhegodsky District, Vologda Oblast, a village in Yavengsky Selsoviet of Vozhegodsky District

== Yaroslavl Oblast ==
As of 2010, four rural localities in Yaroslavl Oblast bear this name:

- Gorodishche, Borisoglebsky District, Yaroslavl Oblast, a village in Davydovsky Rural Okrug of Borisoglebsky District
- Gorodishche, Glebovsky Rural Okrug, Pereslavsky District, Yaroslavl Oblast, a village in Glebovsky Rural Okrug of Pereslavsky District
- Gorodishche, Troitsky Rural Okrug, Pereslavsky District, Yaroslavl Oblast, a selo in Troitsky Rural Okrug of Pereslavsky District
- Gorodishche, Uglichsky District, Yaroslavl Oblast, a village in Pokrovsky Rural Okrug of Uglichsky District
