= Oltișor =

Oltișor Criva
- Location within Romania

Location
- Country: Romania
- Counties: Olt County
- Villages: Grădiștea, Dranovățu, Găneasa, Oltișoru, Criva de Jos, Ociogi, Greci

Physical characteristics
- Source: near Cepari
  - coordinates: 44°29′08″N 24°09′47″E
  - elevation: 207 m (679 ft)
- Mouth: Balta Dascălului
  - location: Osica Forest
  - coordinates: 44°15′05″N 24°22′20″E
  - elevation: 86 m (282 ft)
- Length: 26 km (16 mi)
- Basin size: 159 km^{2} (61 sq mi)

Basin features
- Progression: Balta Dascălului→ Olteț→ Olt→ Danube→ Black Sea
- Tributaries
  - right: Voinicești, Vaslui, Jugălia
- River code: VIII.1.173.16.1

The Oltișor is a left tributary of the river Balta Dascălului in Romania. It flows into the Balta Dascălului near Cioroiu. Its length is 26 km (16 mi) and its basin size is 159 km^{2} (61 sq mi). The upper reach of the river is also known as Criva.
