= Jugălia =

- Location within Romania

Location
- Country: Romania
- Counties: Olt County
- Villages: Piatra-Olt, Piatra

Physical characteristics
- Source: Bistrița-Dranovăț Forest
  - coordinates: 44°23′20″N 24°11′36″E
  - elevation: 104 m (341 ft)
- Mouth: Oltișor
  - location: Piatra
  - coordinates: 44°20′58″N 24°18′03″E
  - elevation: 87 m (285 ft)
- Length: 16 km (9.9 mi)
- Basin size: 42 km^{2} (16 sq mi)

Basin features
- Progression: Oltișor→ Balta Dascălului→ Olteț→ Olt→ Danube→ Black Sea
- River code: VIII.1.173.16.1.3

The Jugălia is a right tributary of the river Oltișor in Romania. It flows into the Oltișor near Piatra. Its length is 16 km (9.9 mi) and its basin size is 42 km^{2} (16 sq mi).
