= Gradište =

Gradište may refer to several places:

== In Serbia ==
- Veliko Gradište, town and municipality in Braničevo District
- Bačko Gradište, village in Bečej municipality
- Malo Gradište, village in Malo Crniće municipality
- Gradište (Bela Palanka), village in Bela Palanka municipality
- Gradište (Knjaževac), village in Knjaževac municipality
- Gradište (Merošina), village in Merošina municipality
- Gradište (Pirot), village in Pirot municipality
- Gradište (Vlasotince), village in Vlasotince municipality

== Montenegro ==
- Gradište Monastery

== In Croatia ==
- Gradište, Croatia, municipality in Vukovar-Syrmia County

== In Kosovo ==
- Gradište (Binačko), fortress and archaeological site in Gjilan municipality

== In Moldova ==
- Gradiște, a commune in Cimișlia District

== In North Macedonia ==
- Dolno Gradište, archaeological site in Kočani Municipality
- Gradište (Skopje), known in ancient times as Tauresium, a fortified settlement from the early Byzantine empire
- Gradište, a village in Kumanovo Municipality

== See also ==
- Grădiște River, Romania
- Grădiştea (disambiguation) (Romanian form)
- Horodyshche (Ukrainian form)
- Hradiště (disambiguation) (Czech and Slovak form)
- Grodziszcze (disambiguation) (Polish form)
- Gradistë belt-plate, an Illyrian silvered bronze belt-plate found in the village of Gradistë in south-eastern Albania near Lake Ohrid
- Horodyshche (disambiguation)
