= Vaslui (disambiguation) =

Vaslui may refer to the following places in Romania:

- Vaslui, a city in eastern Romania
- Vaslui County, an administrative division in eastern Romania
- Vaslui (river), a river in Iași and Vaslui Counties
- Vaslui (Oltișor), a small river in Olt County
- Vasloi (Hasidic dynasty) founded in Vaslui
