= Mircea Damian =

Romanian businessman, writer and journalist (1899 - 1948)

- Born: March 14, 1899; Izvoru, Olt County, Kingdom of Romania
- Died: June 16, 1948 (aged 49)
- Other name: Constantin Mătușa
- Occupations: Writer, Journalist

Mircea Damian (pen name of Constantin Mătușa; March 14, 1899–June 16, 1948) was a Romanian prose writer and journalist.

== Biography ==
Born in Izvoru, Olt County, he attended primary school in his native village, followed by high school in Slatina. He led a disorganized and nomadic life, living from one day to another while wandering from city to city (Bistrița, Dej, Bacău, Galați, Constanța) and founding or working on various obscure publications. He finally settled in Bucharest, where he worked as an editor on several publications and founded and led one of his own, the magazine Vitrina literară (1929–1934). He solidified a reputation as an apt polemicist. He also delved into literature, as an author of humorous stories. He was well-received in the Sburătorul literary circle, although in Istoria literaturii române contemporane, its leader Eugen Lovinescu gave a much more modest opinion of Damian's merits.

His first book was the 1929 Eu sau frate- meu?!..., a collection of humorous sketches. Two others appeared in the same genre (Două și-un cățel, 1933; Bolșevicul, 1936); the latter was retrospective in nature. Other books fit into the genre of literary reportage: Celula nr. 13 (1932), București (1935) and Rogojina (1945). His novels generally were of the journal or confessional variety: De-a curmezișul (1935) and Gheorghe I. Marin (1937). Only the 1936 novel Om had literary pretensions; this love story rings rather false, particularly in its poetic and lyrical passages. Toward the end of his life, he returned to journalism, heading the newspapers București (1941) and Fapta (1945–1947). In May 1941, Nichifor Crainic, Minister of National Propaganda in the Ion Antonescu regime, suspended București, citing its pro-democracy outlook. Damian sent a protest telegram that Crainic, due to its references to his personal life, found violent and offensive. Referred to military prosecutors, the journalist was sentenced to a year's imprisonment for offending the public authorities, and carried out his sentence in full. He later wrote Rogojina, which deals with his incarceration at Văcărești Prison. In 1933, he was awarded the Romanian Writers' Society prize. He died of throat cancer.
