= Diaconești =

Diaconeşti may refer to several villages in Romania:

- Diaconeşti, a village in Agăș Commune, Bacău County
- Diaconeşti, a village in the town of Pucioasa, Dâmboviţa County
- Diaconeşti, a village in Grădiștea, Vâlcea
