= Gorodishchensky District =

Location of Penza Oblast in Russia

Location of Volgograd Oblast in Russia

Gorodishchensky District is the name of several administrative and municipal districts in Russia.

- Gorodishchensky District, Penza Oblast, an administrative and municipal district of Penza Oblast
- Gorodishchensky District, Volgograd Oblast, an administrative and municipal district of Volgograd Oblast

== See also ==
- Gorodishchensky (disambiguation)
- Gorodishche (disambiguation)
