= Grodziszcze =

Grodziszcze may refer to:

- Grodziszcze, Polkowice County in Lower Silesian Voivodeship (south-west Poland)
- Grodziszcze, Świdnica County in Lower Silesian Voivodeship (south-west Poland)
- Grodziszcze, Ząbkowice County in Lower Silesian Voivodeship (south-west Poland)
- Grodziszcze, Świebodzin County in Lubusz Voivodeship (west Poland)
- Grodziszcze, Żary County in Lubusz Voivodeship (west Poland)
- Grodziszcze, Opole Voivodeship (south-west Poland)

== See also ==
- Horodyszcze (disambiguation) (Ukrainian form written in Polish)
- Horodyshche (disambiguation) (proper Ukrainian form)
- Gorodishche, Russia (Russian form)
- Hradiště (disambiguation) (Czech and Slovak form)
- Grădiştea (disambiguation) (Romanian form)
- Gradište (disambiguation) (South-Slavic form)
