= Hradištko =

Hradištko, Hradišťko or Hradíšťko may refer to places in the Czech Republic:

- Hradištko (Nymburk District), a municipality and village in the Central Bohemian Region
- Hradištko (Prague-West District), a municipality and village in the Central Bohemian Region
- Hradišťko, a village and part of Dačice in the South Bohemian Region
- Hradišťko, a village and part of Sedlčany in the Central Bohemian Region
- Hradišťko I, a village and part of Veltruby in the Central Bohemian Region
- Hradišťko II, a village and part of Žiželice (Kolín District) in the Central Bohemian Region
- Hradíšťko, a village and part of Žeretice in the Hradec Králové Region

== See also ==
- Hradiště (disambiguation)
