= Vaslui (Oltișor) =

- Location within Romania

Location
- Country: Romania
- Counties: Olt County
- Villages: Bistrița Nouă, Găneasa

Physical characteristics
- Source
  - coordinates: 44°27′56″N 24°09′35″E
  - elevation: 213 m (699 ft)
- Mouth: Oltișor
  - location: Găneasa
  - coordinates: 44°23′41″N 24°17′01″E
  - elevation: 105 m (344 ft)
- Length: 17 km (11 mi)
- Basin size: 33 km^{2} (13 sq mi)

Basin features
- Progression: Oltișor→ Balta Dascălului→ Olteț→ Olt→ Danube→ Black Sea
- River code: VIII.1.173.16.1.2

The Vaslui is a right tributary of the river Oltișor in Romania. It flows into the Oltișor in Găneasa. Its length is 17 km (11 mi) and its basin size is 33 km^{2} (13 sq mi).
