= Horodiștea =

Horodiştea may refer to several villages in Romania:

- Horodiştea, a village in Păltiniș, Botoșani commune, Botoşani County
- Horodiştea, a village in Cotnari commune, Iaşi County

== See also ==
- Horodiște (disambiguation)
