= Piatra-Olt =

- Town
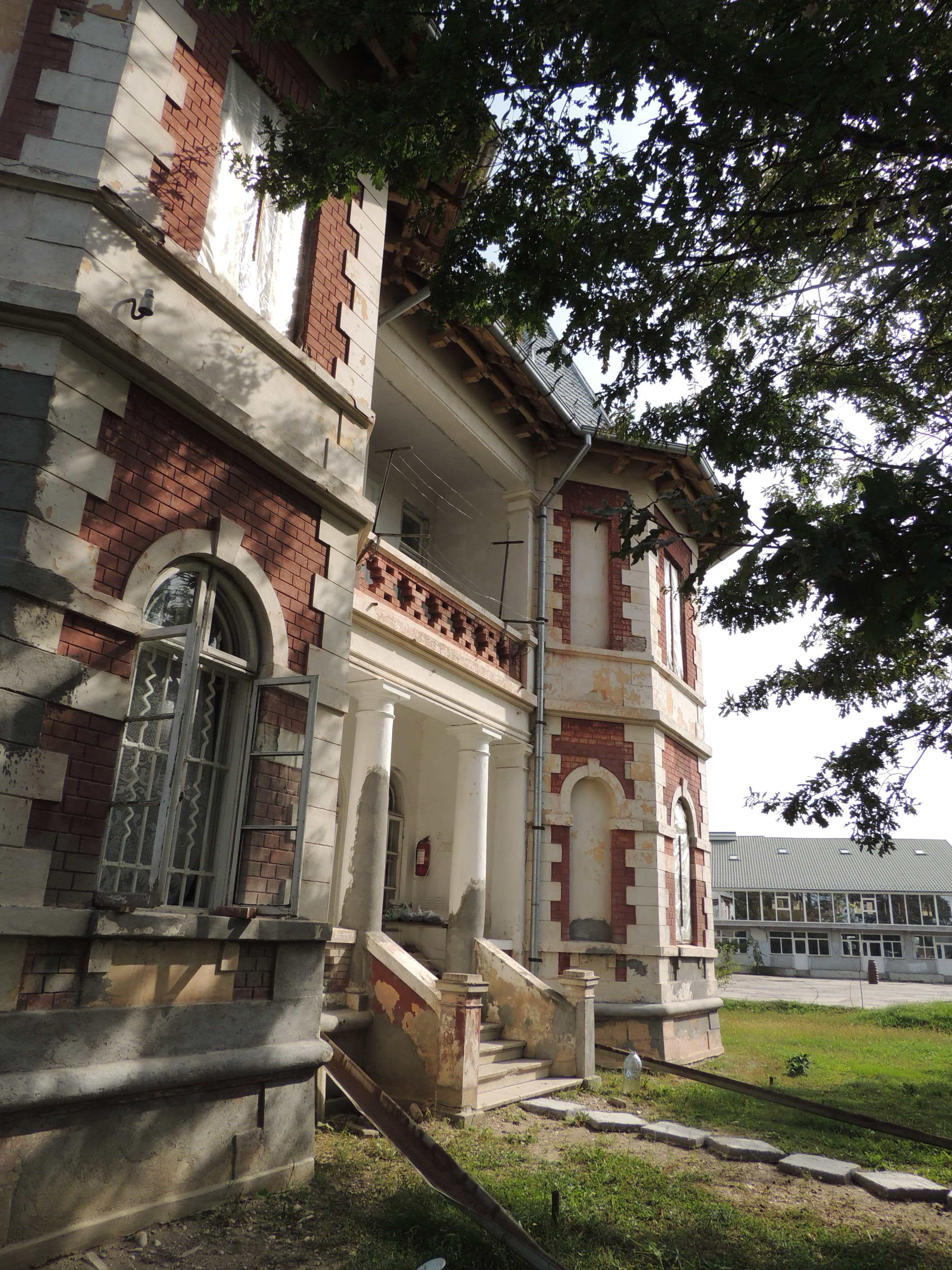
- Argeșanu mansion

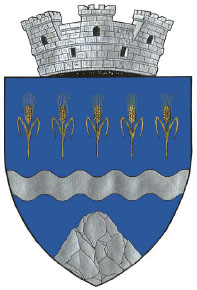
- Coat of arms

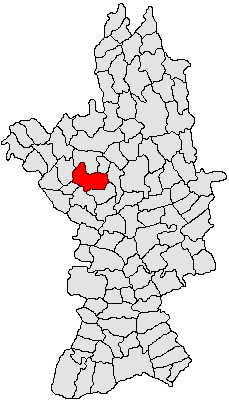
- Location in Olt County

- Location in Romania
- Coordinates: 44°22′N 24°16′E
- Country: Romania
- County: Olt

Government
  - Mayor (2024–2028): Nicușor Rada (PSD)
- Area: 76.83 km^{2} (29.66 sq mi)
- Elevation: 110 m (360 ft)
- Population (2021-12-01): 6,000
  - Density: 78/km^{2} (200/sq mi)
- Time zone: UTC+02:00 (EET)
  - Summer (DST): UTC+03:00 (EEST)
- Postal code: 235500
- Area code: (+40) 02 49
- Vehicle reg.: OT
- Website: primariapiatraolt.ro

Piatra-Olt is a town in Olt County, Oltenia, Romania. The town administers five villages: Bistrița Nouă, Criva de Jos, Criva de Sus, Enoșești, and Piatra. The town is an important railway station and road intersection. It officially became a town in 1989, as a result of the Romanian rural systematization program.

== History ==
Historical population
Year	Pop.	±%
1992	6,615	—
2002	6,583	−0.5%
2011	6,299	−4.3%
2021	6,000	−4.7%
Source: Census data

The oldest relics are from the Neolithic period, when there was a small settlement.

In Antiquity, the local Dacic population built a fortress, Acidava. The Romans conquered the area. The Romans built a road and rebuilt the fortress Acidava. The ruins of the fortress can be seen even today. The area was still inhabited after the retreat of the Roman legios.

From the Middle Ages come the first written documents about the villages that now compose the town.

- Bistrița Nouă is first attested in 1835. The name comes from the Bistrița Monastery. The land where is the village today was the property of the monastery. The village was also called Fleștenoagele or Fleșcinogele.
- Criva, also known as Criva de Jos, was attested on May 26, 1630, as a property of a local boyar, jupan Gorgan biv vel spătar. Part of the village has been known as Criva de Sus since 1940. The ruins of the Dacic fortress, Acidava, are located here.
- Enosești, also known as Ienușești or Ienoșești, was officially formed on March 31, 1864, as an independent commune. The first notices about the village are from 1814. The Roman fortress, Acidava, is located here.
- Piatra is noted for the first time on April 14, 1529, as the place where an important boyar, marele ban Pârvu Craioves-cu died. On May 15, 1592, Ștefan Surdu voievod, ruler over Valahia at that time, confirmed that Piatra and several villages around it were the property of jupânița Neacsa si fiului ei Mihail (local boyars). Part of the village appears through history as Piatra de Jos and Piatra de Sus.
- Some village names were previously mentioned, but are no longer used today, like Flestenoaga (1941), Jegălia (17th century) and Matei Basarab (an official name of Enoșești).

In 1878, the Pitești - Vîrciorova railroad was operational and the Piatra Olt railway station (known at that time as Piatra) was built. This was the beginning of the modern history of the town as a railway town. Later, other railways were built along the Olt River.

Piatra-Olt was officially declared a town in 1989.

== Location ==
The town is situated in the central-eastern part of the Wallachian Plain, at the eastern border of the Oltenia historical region and in the western part of Olt County. Nearby towns to the east are: Slatina (11 km (6.8 mi)) and Pitești (93 km (58 mi)); to the west: Balș (19 km (12 mi)) and Craiova (45 km (28 mi)); to the north: Drăgășani (31 km (19 mi)) and Râmnicu Vâlcea (86 km (53 mi)); and to the south Caracal (33 km (21 mi)) and Corabia (74 km (46 mi)). Note that these are intermediate values between road and railway distances.

== General ==
The main village, Piatra, is located near the train station and expands to the southeast. It is divided into two parts: the eastern part (named Piatra Sat by the locals) and the western part, near the station, called Gară (in English, 'station'). Enoșești is located east of Piatra, on the 64 National Road and is the road access way to Piatra. Criva is located southeast of Piatra and has a small railway station. Bistrița Nouă is north of Piatra, 2 km (1.2 mi) by foot and more than 7 km (4.3 mi) by road.

== Geography ==
The town is at the northeastern end of the Romanați Plain, a subdivision of the Wallachian Plain. The average altitude is 100 to 120 m (330 to 390 ft). Despite the relatively high altitude and a big number of valleys and smooth hills, the area is very good for agriculture. The town is placed near the Olt River, on a terrace that protects it from floods. There are several dams on the river. There are some other small rivers that sometimes dry up in summer, like the Vaslui and the Oltișor. They are all tributaries of the Olt and are formed near Piatra Olt.

== Climate ==
Like all the southern part of Romania, Piatra-Olt has a temperate climate. Usually, summers are hot and with little precipitation, while winters have moderate temperatures, with occasional wind intensification. Sometimes, snow can cause blockades on the roads and railways.

== Demographics ==
At the 2021 census, Piatra Olt had a population of 6,000, down from 6,299 in 2011. At the 2002 census, 90.6% of inhabitants were Romanians and 9.4% Roma. In terms of religious affiliation, 97.7% were Romanian Orthodox and 1.6% Seventh-day Adventist.

There are ethnic conflicts between the Romanian and Roma groups. In 2007, forced intervention was required to calm down the population and avoid violent conflicts.

== Natives ==
- Răzvan Raț (born 1981), footballer

== Transportation ==
The main way to get to Piatra-Olt is by train. There are four railways that lead to Piatra-Olt:

- 201 railway connects Piatra-Olt with Sibiu and Râmnicu Vâlcea (note that the train station is named Rîmnicu Vîlcea because the train stations are written with î and not with â).
- 901 railway (eastern part) connects Piatra-Olt with Slatina, Pitești, and Bucharest.
- 901 railway (western part) continues the eastern sector from Piatra-Olt to Craiova. Several trains pass from Bucharest to Craiova, while others have the last station at Piatra-Olt.
- 910 railway connects Piatra-Olt with Caracal and Corabia. The sector between Caracal and Corabia is used by a private railway company.

The town is also an important road intersection. The intersection is in fact in the nearby commune, Găneasa. The access way to Piatra-Olt is county road DJ 677. It is 5 km (3.1 mi) from Piatra-Olt to Găneasa by road and 2 km (1.2 mi) in a straight line. All national roads are paved, while the county road is a concrete road, like other smaller roads in the town. The roads follow nearly the same path as the railways:

- The national road DN64 connects to the South Găneasa with Caracal and Corabia; to the North, it continues to Râmnicu Vâlcea.
- The national road DN65 (part of European route E574) connects Găneasa to the East with Pitești and to the West with Craiova. The road crosses the Olt River to Slatina over the Lotru Bridge.

== Economy ==
The main industries are related to railway maintenance and transportation. There are 66 trains traveling every day through the station. However, agriculture is well represented (large-scale agriculture with grain and corn fields, fishing and pomiculture.) There are large companies in the agricultural sector. The industry is based on textiles, metallic and concrete products, the food industry, and a wood mill. Many firms have their headquarters in other places but develop business in Piatra Olt.

== Institutions ==
The institutions are placed near the train station. The town hall is on Florilor Street, not far from the police station. Every village except Bistrița Nouă has its own church. There is also an Adventist church. There are several schools and a high school.

=== Other places ===
The town has a stadium and a football team. There is a park with a musical fountain. There is a small market and there are small shops that provide goods for the local population, including human and veterinary pharmacies.

== Tourism ==
There are many tourist attractions in the town. The following attractions can be visited in a few hours, so a traveller can see them while waiting to catch a train.

- The ruins of Acidava are still visible. Many artefacts can be seen at the local museum or at the Olt County Museum in Slatina.
- The local museum contains artefacts from Acidava fortress and has a section about railroad history. The museum is not far from the train station.
- The haunted house of Piatra Olt is a ruin of an old boyar house, where people say there are ghosts.
- Piatra Olt railroad complex includes a vast number of buildings, aligned along the railway. The most impressive and oldest is the trainyard.

There are other tourist attractions that can be seen nearby:

- The Olt River, with its large artificial lakes, is an important destination for fishing and a beautiful landscape. There are also several fishing lakes around the town.
- The Brâncoveni Monastery is 15 km (9.3 mi) to the south, with both access by road and railway.
- Piatra Olt is the gateway to many tourist destinations, like Călimănești, a resort on the Olt River.
