= Alro Slatina =

Coordinates: 44°26′40″N 24°23′13″E

Alro SA
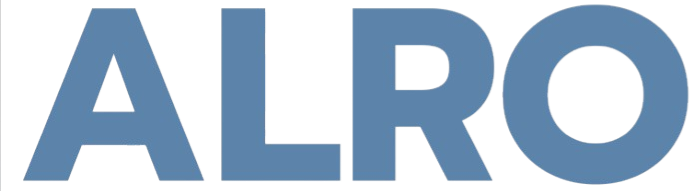
- Type: Public company
- Traded as: BVB: ALR
- Industry: Aluminium
- Founded: 1963
- Headquarters: Slatina, Romania
- Key people: Marin CILIANU (CEO)
- Products: Aluminium products, Aluminium alloys
- Revenue: US$673 million (2017)
- Number of employees: 3,932 (2017)
- Website: www.alro.ro

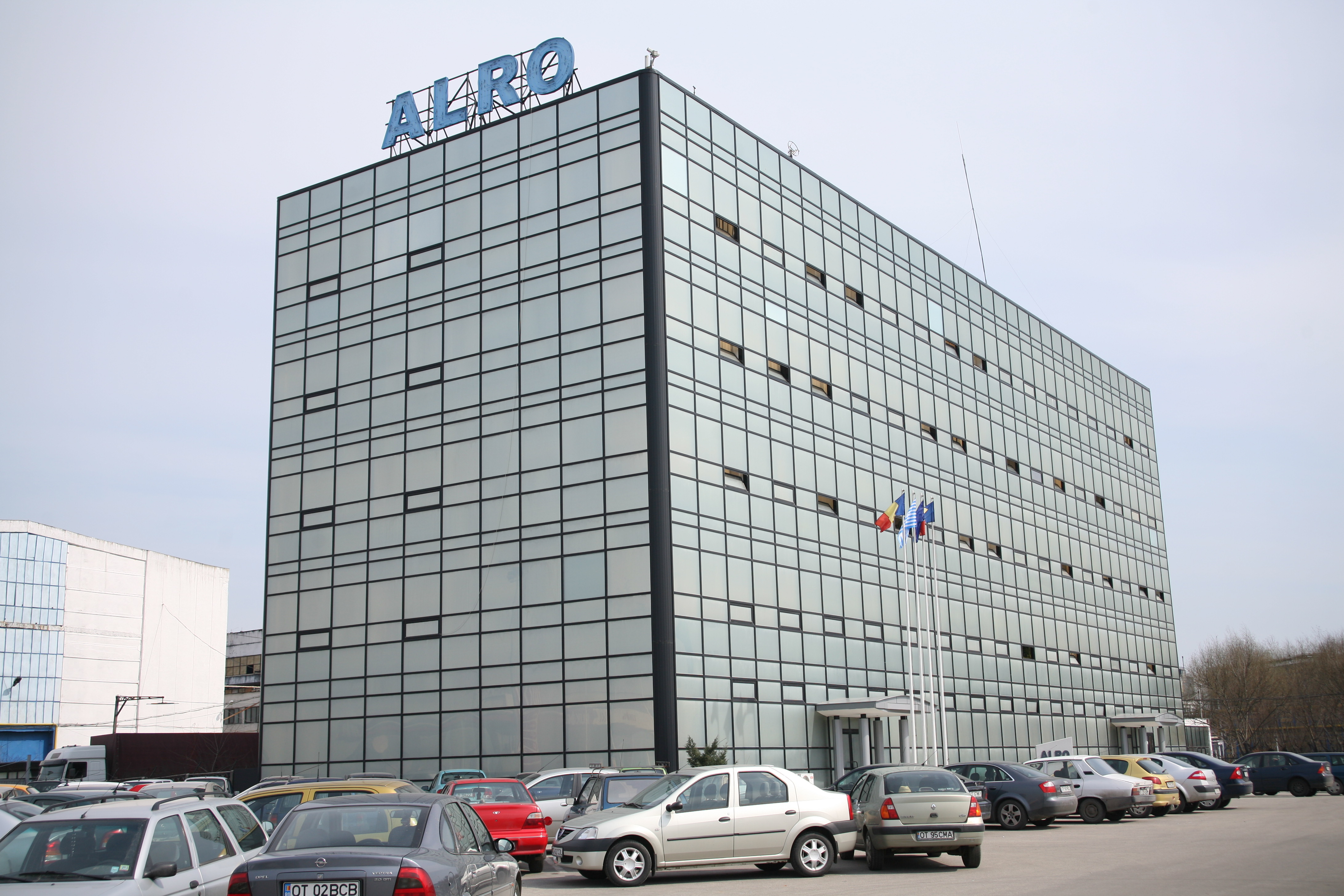
Alro SA headquarters in Slatina (Romania)

Alro SA, established in 1963, is one of the biggest aluminium companies in Romania and in Europe. It started operation in 1965. Alro's primary aluminium facilities are located in Slatina and currently are a smelter and processing facilities. It also includes a cast house, hot and cold rolling mills and an extrusion shop.

In 2007 the output of primary aluminium reached 283,000 tonnes thus making Alro the largest aluminium producer in Central Europe, Southeast Europe and in Eastern Europe excluding CIS countries.

More than 80% of Alro output is sold on the international market. Alro's products are sold throughout the European Union, in Italy, Greece, Austria and Hungary, as well as Turkey, the Balkan countries and the United States. Alro is a metal brand registered on the London Metal Exchange.

Alro is also the largest electric-power consumer in Romania accounting for 8% of the national electric-power consumption.

Alro is listed on the Bucharest Stock Exchange (ALR ticker) and has a market capitalisation of around US$2 billion.

== Takeover ==
In September 2005, Alro bought from Balli Group 67% of Alum a Romanian company based in Tulcea that produced 540,000 tonnes of alumina in 2006 for around US$ 9 million. In December 2005 Alro bought a remaining 25% of Alum shares from SIF1 for around US$4.4 million.

== Parent ==
In 2002, Alro was privatised and taken over by Marco Industries BV (later renamed into Vimetco NV). Vimetco NV, a Dutch company listed on the London Stock Exchange (Vico), owns 84% of Alro's shares.
