= Grădinari =

Grădinari may refer to several places in Romania:

- Grădinari, Caraş-Severin, a commune in Caraş-Severin County
- Grădinari, Giurgiu, a commune in Giurgiu County
- Grădinari, Olt, a commune in Olt County
- Grădinari, a village in Drăgăneşti Commune, Bihor County
- Grădinari, a village in Golăiești Commune, Iaşi County

== See also ==
- Grădiștea (disambiguation)
