= Grădiștea =

Grădiştea may refer to:

- Grădiștea, Brăila, a commune in Brăila County, Romania
- Grădiștea, Călărași, a commune in Călăraşi County, Romania
- Grădiștea, Ilfov, a commune in Ilfov County, Romania
- Grădiștea, Vâlcea, a commune in Vâlcea County, Romania
- Grădiştea, a village in Grecești Commune, Dolj County, Romania
- Grădiştea, a village in Comana Commune, Giurgiu County, Romania
- Grădiştea, a village in Găneasa Commune, Olt County, Romania
- Grădiştea, a village in Boldeşti-Grădiştea Commune, Prahova County, Romania
- Grădiştea de Munte, a village in Orăștioara de Sus Commune, Hunedoara County, Romania
- Grădişte, the official name until 1941 of Sarmizegetusa Commune, Hunedoara County, Romania

== See also ==
- Grădiște River, Romania
- Grădinari (disambiguation)
- Gradište (disambiguation)
- Hradiště (disambiguation)
- Grodziszcze (disambiguation)
