= Lotru Bridge =

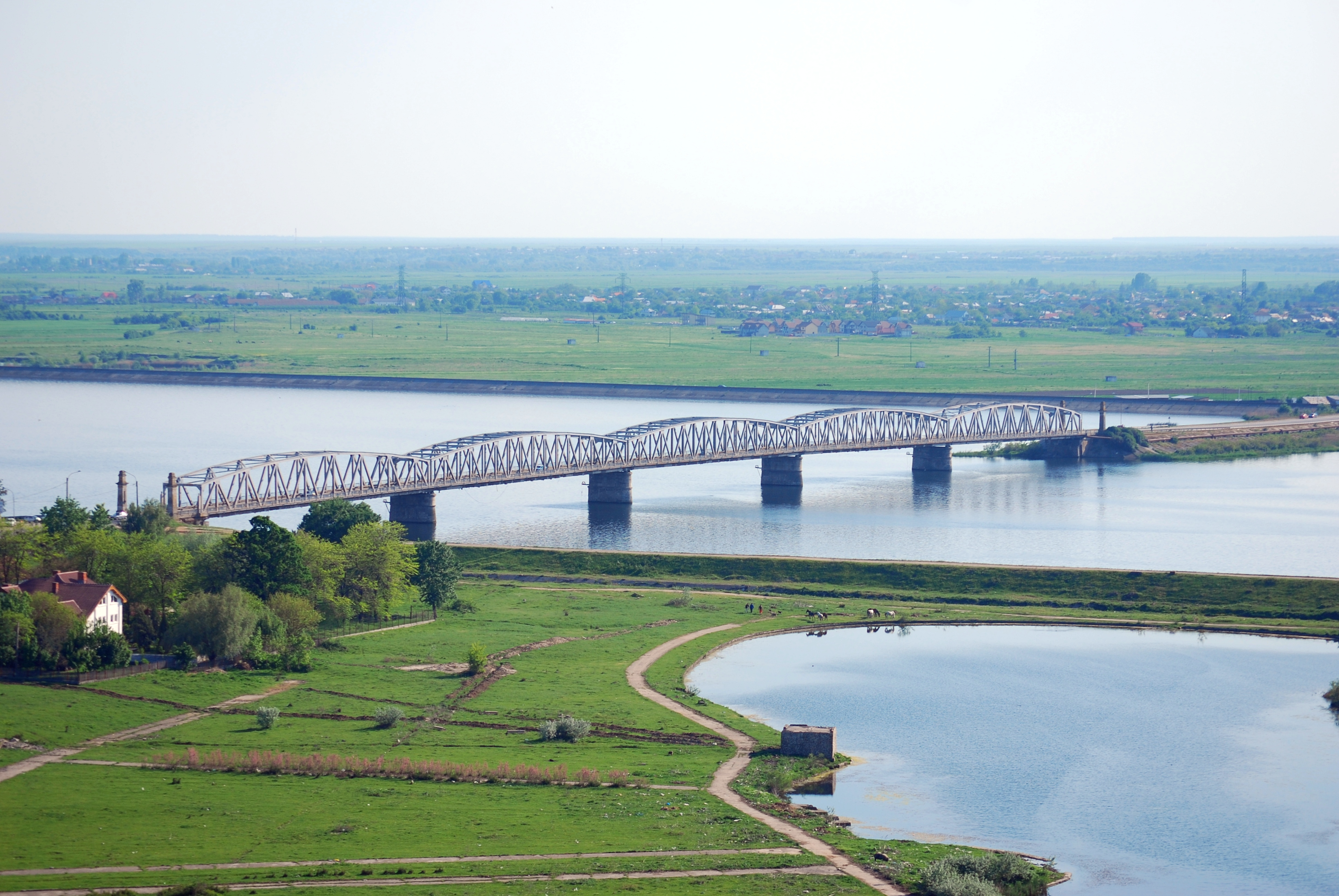
- The bridge seen from Grădiște Hill in Slatina
- Coordinates: 44.419761°N 24.338833°E
- Carries: road and railway track
- Crosses: Olt River
- Locale: between Piatra-Olt and Slatina

Characteristics
- Total length: 200 m

History
- Opened: 1899

Location
- Interactive map of Lotru Bridge

The Lotru Bridge is a bridge that spans the Olt River connecting the cities of Piatra-Olt and Slatina.

The bridge is 200 m (660 ft) in length with 4 spans of 50 m, each being constructed as a steel truss bridge. The bridge carries the national road DN65, which connects Craiova to Pitești.

== See also ==
- List of bridges in Romania
