= Balta Dascălului =

- Location within Romania

Location
- Country: Romania
- Counties: Olt County

Physical characteristics
- Mouth: Olteț
  - location: Cioroiu
  - coordinates: 44°13′54″N 24°24′31″E
  - elevation: 83 m (272 ft)

Basin features
- Progression: Olteț→ Olt→ Danube→ Black Sea
- Tributaries
  - left: Oltișor
- River code: VIII.1.173.16

The Balta Dascălului is a left tributary of the river Olteț in Romania. It flows into the Olteț near Cioroiu, close to the confluence of the Olteț and Olt. Its length is 12 km (7.5 mi) and its basin size is 222 km^{2} (86 sq mi).
