= Gorodishche, Cherepovetsky District, Vologda Oblast =

Gorodishche Городище
- Village
- Location within Vologda Oblast Location within Russia
- Coordinates: 59°03′N 37°51′E
- Country: Russia
- Region: Vologda Oblast
- District: Cherepovetsky District
- Time zone: UTC+3:00

Gorodishche (Russian: Городище) is a rural locality (a village) in Yugskoye Rural Settlement, Cherepovetsky District, Vologda Oblast, Russia. The population was 54 as of 2002. There are 26 streets.

== Geography ==
Gorodishche is located 12 km (7.5 mi) south of Cherepovets (the district's administrative centre) by road. Kostyayevka is the nearest rural locality.
