= Gorodishchensky =

Gorodishchensky (masculine), Gorodishchenskaya (feminine), or Gorodishchenskoye (neuter) may refer to:

- Gorodishchensky District, name of several districts in Russia
- Gorodishchenskaya, a rural locality (a village) in Arkhangelsk Oblast, Russia
