= Gradište (Merošina) =

Gradište Градиште
- Village
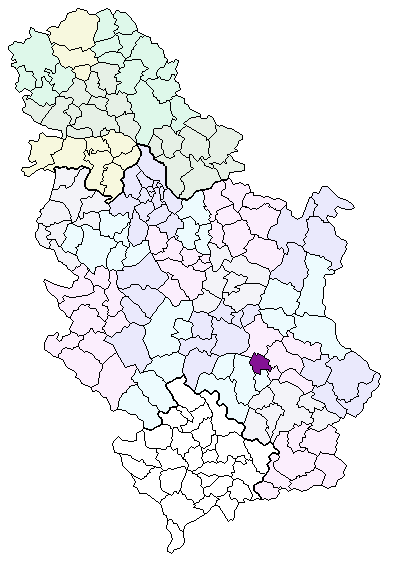
- Location of Merošina municipality in Serbia

- Location within Serbia
- Country: Serbia
- District: Nišava
- Municipality: Merošina

Population (2002)
  - Total: 596
- Time zone: UTC+1 (CET)
  - Summer (DST): UTC+2 (CEST)

Gradište is a village in Serbia in the municipality Merošina in Nisava district . According to the census of 2002, there were 596 people (according to the census of 1991, there were 652 inhabitants). In the near Gradiste, is the archeological site Kulina.

== Demographics ==
In the village of Gradiste live 493 adult inhabitants, and the average age is 44.9 years (44.3 for men and 45.6 for women). The village has 174 households, and the average number of members per household is 3.43. This village is largely populated by Serbs (according to the census of 2002) and in the last three censuses, noticed a decline in population.
