= Koldín =

- Municipality
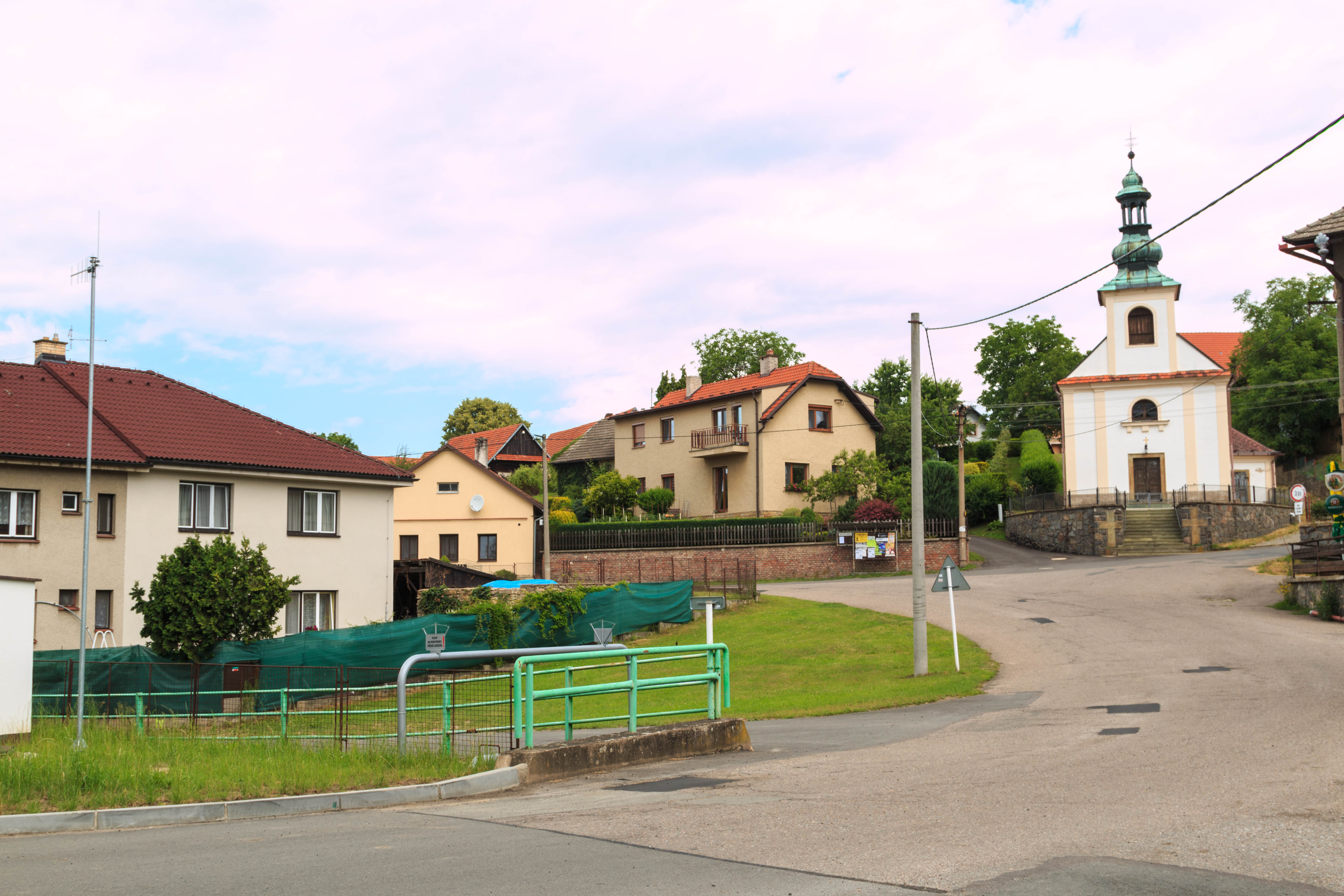
- Centre of Koldín

- Flag Coat of arms

- Location in the Czech Republic
- Coordinates: 50°2′13″N 16°15′6″E
- Country: Czech Republic
- Region: Pardubice
- District: Ústí nad Orlicí
- First mentioned: 1309

Area
  - Total: 6.35 km^{2} (2.45 sq mi)
- Elevation: 341 m (1,119 ft)

Population (2026-01-01)
  - Total: 368
  - Density: 58.0/km^{2} (150/sq mi)
- Time zone: UTC+1 (CET)
  - Summer (DST): UTC+2 (CEST)
- Postal code: 565 01
- Website: www.koldin.cz

Koldín is a municipality and village in Ústí nad Orlicí District in the Pardubice Region of the Czech Republic. It has about 400 inhabitants.

Koldín lies approximately 13 kilometres (8 mi) north-west of Ústí nad Orlicí, 35 km (22 mi) east of Pardubice, and 132 km (82 mi) east of Prague.

== Administrative division ==
Koldín consists of two municipal parts (in brackets population according to the 2021 census):

- Koldín (239)
- Hradiště (126)

== Demographics ==
Historical population
Year	Pop.	±%
1869	606	—
1880	635	+4.8%
1890	610	−3.9%
1900	596	−2.3%
1910	575	−3.5%
1921	545	−5.2%
1930	547	+0.4%
1950	463	−15.4%
1961	416	−10.2%
1970	406	−2.4%
1980	340	−16.3%
1991	320	−5.9%
2001	335	+4.7%
2011	346	+3.3%
2021	365	+5.5%
Source: Censuses
