= Staré Hradiště =

- Municipality
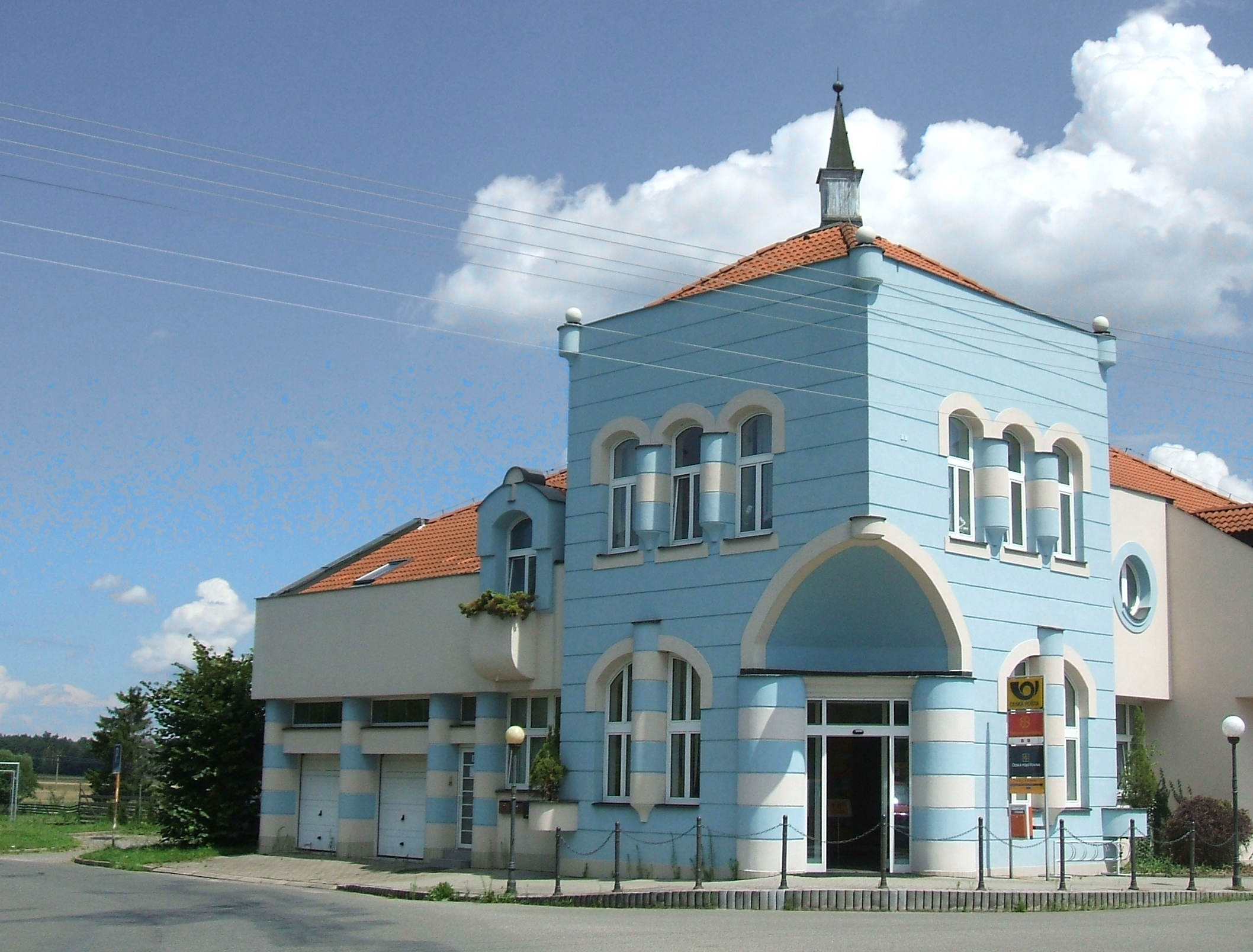
- Post office

- Flag Coat of arms

- Location in the Czech Republic
- Coordinates: 50°3′56″N 15°46′44″E
- Country: Czech Republic
- Region: Pardubice
- District: Pardubice
- First mentioned: 1142

Area
  - Total: 8.79 km^{2} (3.39 sq mi)
- Elevation: 220 m (720 ft)

Population (2026-01-01)
  - Total: 2,079
  - Density: 237/km^{2} (613/sq mi)
- Time zone: UTC+1 (CET)
  - Summer (DST): UTC+2 (CEST)
- Postal code: 533 52
- Website: www.stare-hradiste-obec.cz

Staré Hradiště (German: Alt Hradischt) is a municipality and village in Pardubice District in the Pardubice Region of the Czech Republic. It has about 2,100 inhabitants.

== Administrative division ==
Staré Hradiště consists of three municipal parts (in brackets population according to the 2021 census):

- Staré Hradiště (1,173)
- Brozany (516)
- Hradiště na Písku (261)

== Etymology ==
The name Staré Hradiště means 'old gord'. Because the name Hradiště is common name of Czech places, the prefix starý was given to distinguish it from other places.

== Geography ==
Staré Hradiště is located north of Pardubice, in its immediate vicinity. It lies in a flat landscape in the East Elbe Table. The highest point is at 241 m (791 ft) above sea level. The municipality is situated on the right bank of the Elbe River.

== History ==
The first written mention of Hradiště is from 1142. Until the Hussite Wars, the village was owned by the monastery in Opatovice. In 1436, Staré Hradiště was acquired by Diviš Bořek of Miletínek. The village was then joined to the Pardubice estate and shared its owners and destinies.

== Demographics ==
Historical population

Year	Pop.	±%
1869	862	—
1880	902	+4.6%
1890	876	−2.9%
1900	834	−4.8%
1910	875	+4.9%

Year	Pop.	±%
1921	846	−3.3%
1930	1,038	+22.7%
1950	958	−7.7%
1961	1,087	+13.5%
1970	1,121	+3.1%

Year	Pop.	±%
1980	1,121	+0.0%
1991	1,097	−2.1%
2001	1,170	+6.7%
2011	1,624	+38.8%
2021	1,950	+20.1%

Source: Censuses

== Transport ==
There are no railways or major roads passing through the municipality.

== Sights ==
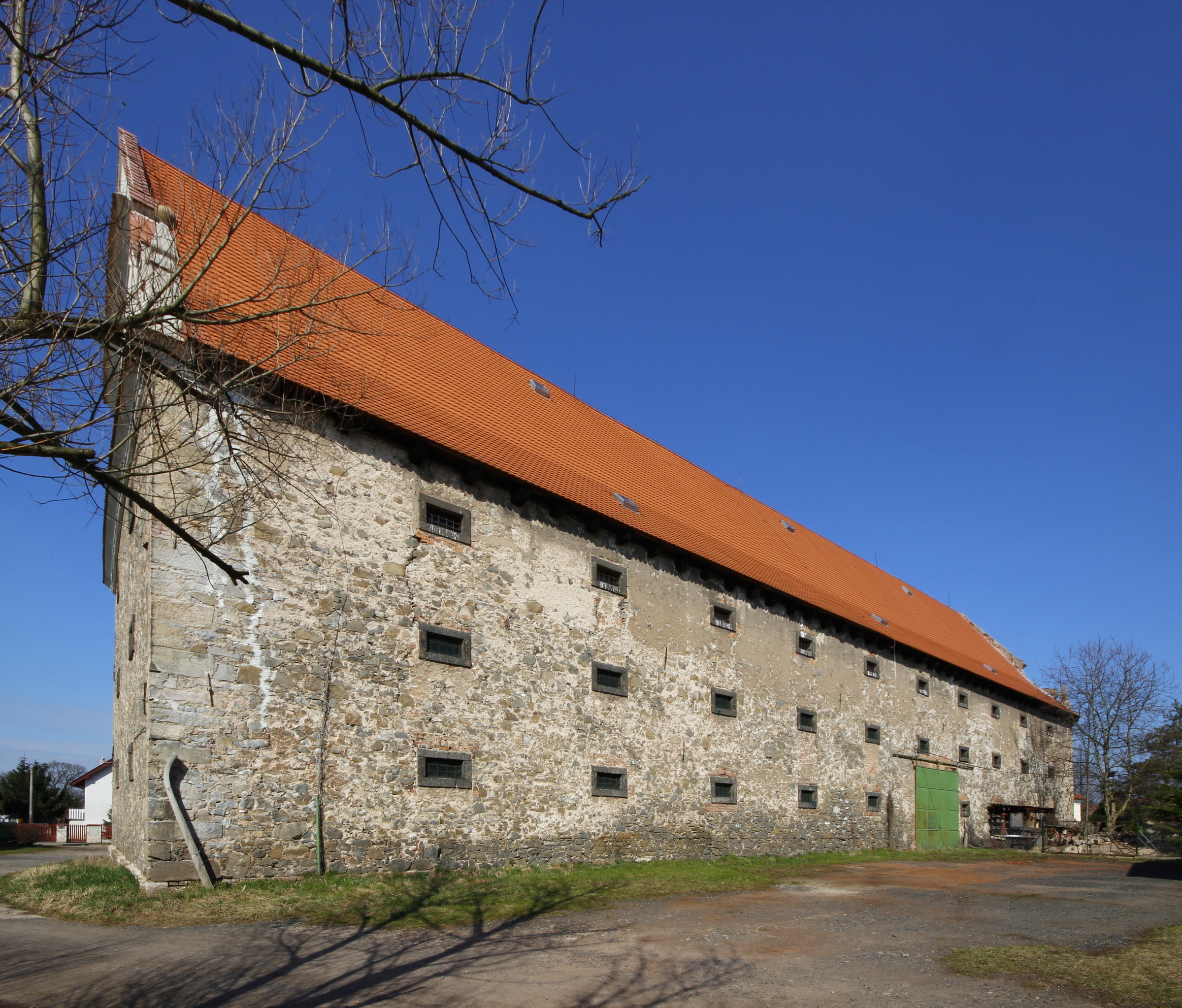
Baroque granary

The only protected cultural monument in the municipality is a Baroque granary.
