= Hradiště (Domažlice District) =

- Municipality
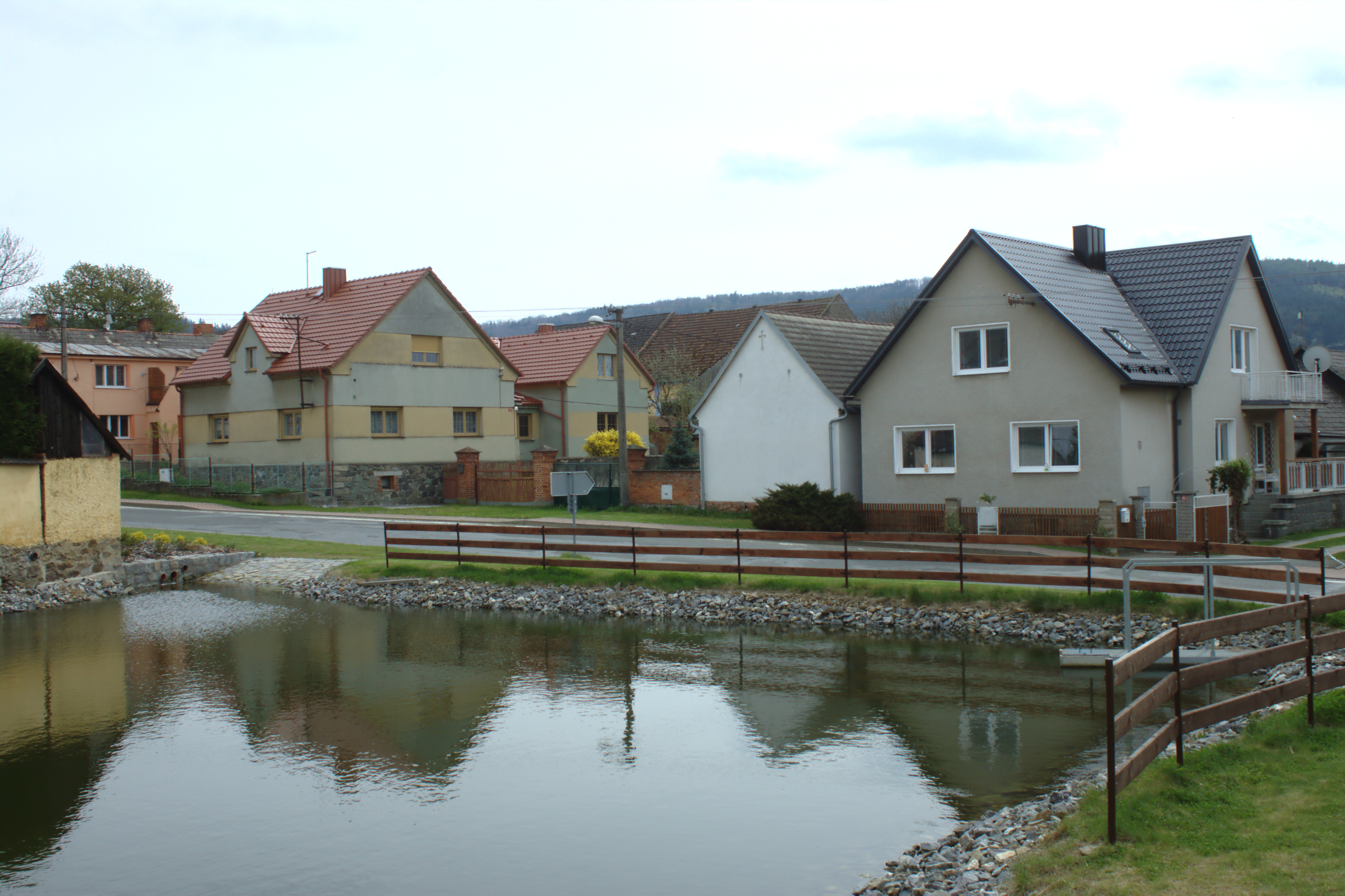
- Centre of Hradiště

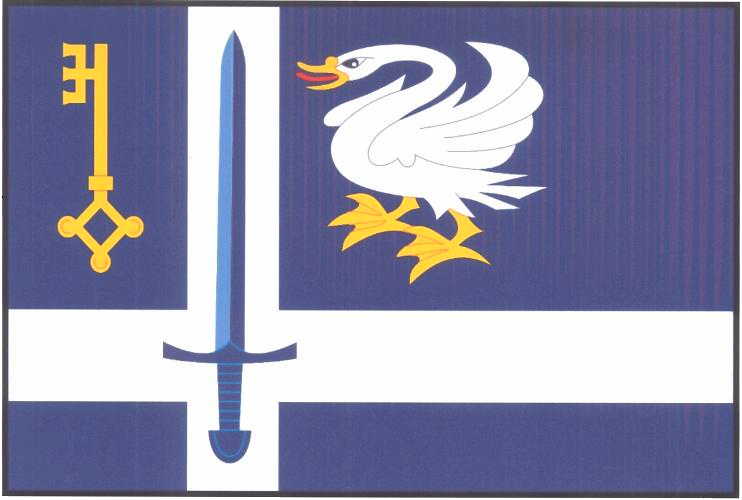
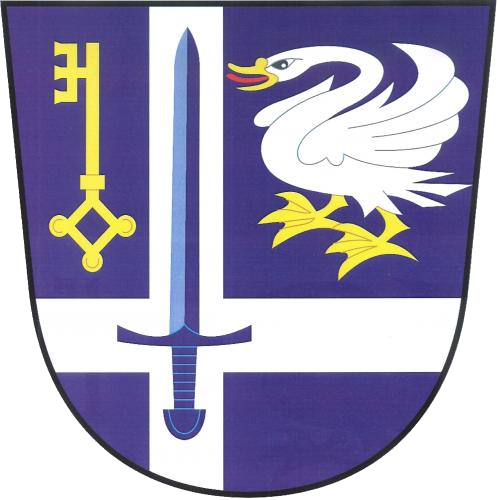
- Flag Coat of arms

- Location in the Czech Republic
- Coordinates: 49°27′54″N 13°3′6″E
- Country: Czech Republic
- Region: Plzeň
- District: Domažlice
- First mentioned: 1379

Area
  - Total: 5.70 km^{2} (2.20 sq mi)
- Elevation: 421 m (1,381 ft)

Population (2026-01-01)
  - Total: 190
  - Density: 33/km^{2} (86/sq mi)
- Time zone: UTC+1 (CET)
  - Summer (DST): UTC+2 (CEST)
- Postal code: 345 43
- Website: www.obechradiste.cz

Hradiště is a municipality and village in Domažlice District in the Plzeň Region of the Czech Republic. It has about 200 inhabitants.

Hradiště lies approximately 10 kilometres (6 mi) east of Domažlice, 40 km (25 mi) south-west of Plzeň, and 121 km (75 mi) south-west of Prague.

== History ==
The first written mention of Hradiště is from 1379, at which time it belonged to a lord named Ratimír. The village was then owned by various lesser noblemen. From the beginning of the 16th century until the establishment of an independent municipality in 1850, Hradiště was divided into two parts with different owners.

== Demographics ==
Historical population
| Year | Pop. | ±% |
|---|---|---|
| 1869 | 388 | — |
| 1880 | 388 | +0.0% |
| 1890 | 353 | −9.0% |
| 1900 | 333 | −5.7% |
| 1910 | 383 | +15.0% |
| 1921 | 362 | −5.5% |
| 1930 | 333 | −8.0% |
| 1950 | 225 | −32.4% |
| 1961 | 215 | −4.4% |
| 1970 | 183 | −14.9% |
| 1980 | 144 | −21.3% |
| 1991 | 169 | +17.4% |
| 2001 | 158 | −6.5% |
| 2011 | 164 | +3.8% |
| 2021 | 181 | +10.4% |
Source: Censuses
