= Hradište, Poltár District =

Hradište Várkút
- Municipality
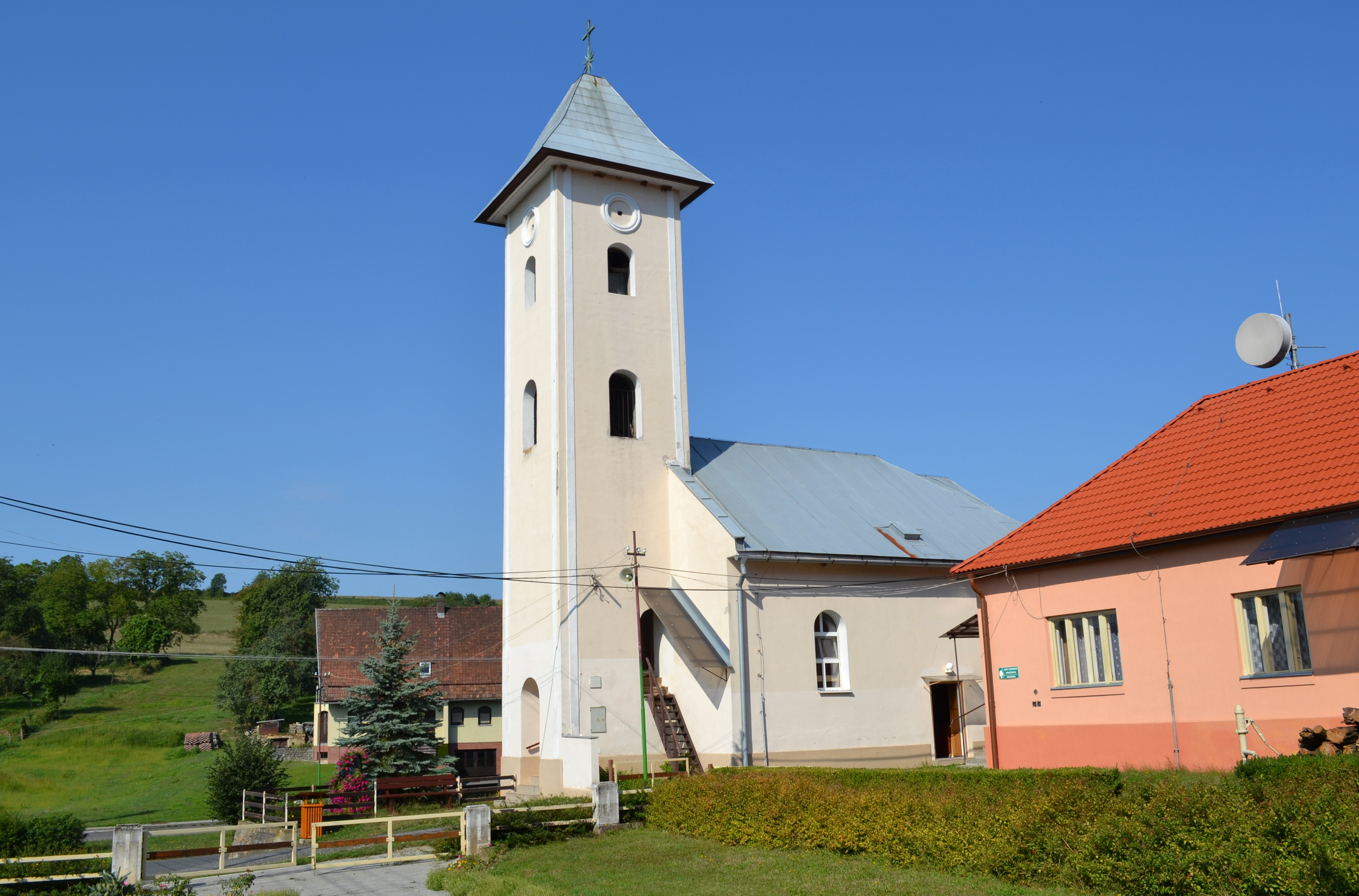

- Flag

- Location of Hradište in the Banská Bystrica Region Location of Hradište in Slovakia
- Coordinates: 48°29′N 19°43′E
- Country: Slovakia
- Region: Banská Bystrica Region
- District: Poltár District
- First mentioned: 1411

Area
  - Total: 14.56 km^{2} (5.62 sq mi)
- Elevation: 297 m (974 ft)

Population (2025)
  - Total: 219
- Time zone: UTC+1 (CET)
  - Summer (DST): UTC+2 (CEST)
- Postal code: 985 25
- Area code: +421 47
- Vehicle registration plate (until 2022): PT
- Website: hradiste.sk

Hradište (Hungarian: Várkút) is a village and municipality in the Poltár District in the Banská Bystrica Region of Slovakia.

== History ==
Before the establishment of independent Czechoslovakia in 1918, Hradište was part of Nógrád County within the Kingdom of Hungary. From 1939 to 1945, it was part of the Slovak Republic.

== Population ==
Population statistic (10 years)
Year	1995	2005	2015	2025
Count	299	286	241	219
Difference		−4.34%	−15.73%	−9.12%

Population statistic
Year	2024	2025
Count	226	219
Difference		−3.09%

It has a population of 219 people (31 December 2025).

=== Ethnicity ===
Census 2021 (1+ %)
Ethnicity	Number	Fraction
Slovak	229	95.41%
Not found out	8	3.33%
Romani	6	2.5%
Czech	3	1.25%
Total	240	

In year 2021 was 240 people by ethnicity 229 as Slovak, 8 as Not found out, 6 as Romani, 3 as Czech, 2 as German and 1 as Russian.

Note on population: The difference values of population numbers in the table "Population statistic" and in the sections "Ethnicity" & "Religion" is caused by the use of various statistical methods.

=== Religion ===
Census 2021 (1+ %)
Religion	Number	Fraction
Evangelical Church	99	41.25%
Roman Catholic Church	78	32.5%
None	53	22.08%
Not found out	7	2.92%
Total	240	

In year 2021 was 240 people by religion 99 from Evangelical Church, 78 from Roman Catholic Church, 53 from None, 7 from Not found out, 2 from Greek Catholic Church and 1 from Ad hoc movements.

== Genealogical resources ==
The records for genealogical research are available at the state archive "Statny Archiv in Banska Bystrica, Slovakia"

- Roman Catholic church records (births/marriages/deaths): 1776-1905 (parish B)
- Lutheran church records (births/marriages/deaths): 1720-1929 (parish B)

== See also ==
- List of municipalities and towns in Slovakia
