= Gorodishche, Dobryanka, Perm Krai =

Gorodishche Городище
- Village
- Location within Perm Krai Location within Russia
- Coordinates: 58°10′N 56°21′E
- Country: Russia
- Region: Perm Krai
- District: Dobryansky District
- Time zone: UTC+5:00

Gorodishche (Russian: Городище) is a rural locality (a village) in Dobryansky District, Perm Krai, Russia. The population was 11 as of 2010. There are 12 streets.

== Geography ==
Gorodishche is located 48 km south of Dobryanka (the district's administrative centre) by road. Pyaty km is the nearest rural locality.
