= Gorodishche, Alexeyevsky District, Belgorod Oblast =

Gorodishche Городище
- Khutor
- Location within Belgorod Oblast Location within Russia
- Coordinates: 50°45′N 38°43′E
- Country: Russia
- Region: Belgorod Oblast
- District: Alexeyevsky District
- Time zone: UTC+3:00

Gorodishche (Russian: Городище) is a rural locality (a khutor) in Alexeyevsky District, Belgorod Oblast, Russia. The population was 56 as of 2010. There are 3 streets.

== Geography ==
Gorodishche is located 17 km southeast of Alexeyevka (the district's administrative centre) by road.
