= Dolní Hradiště =

- Municipality
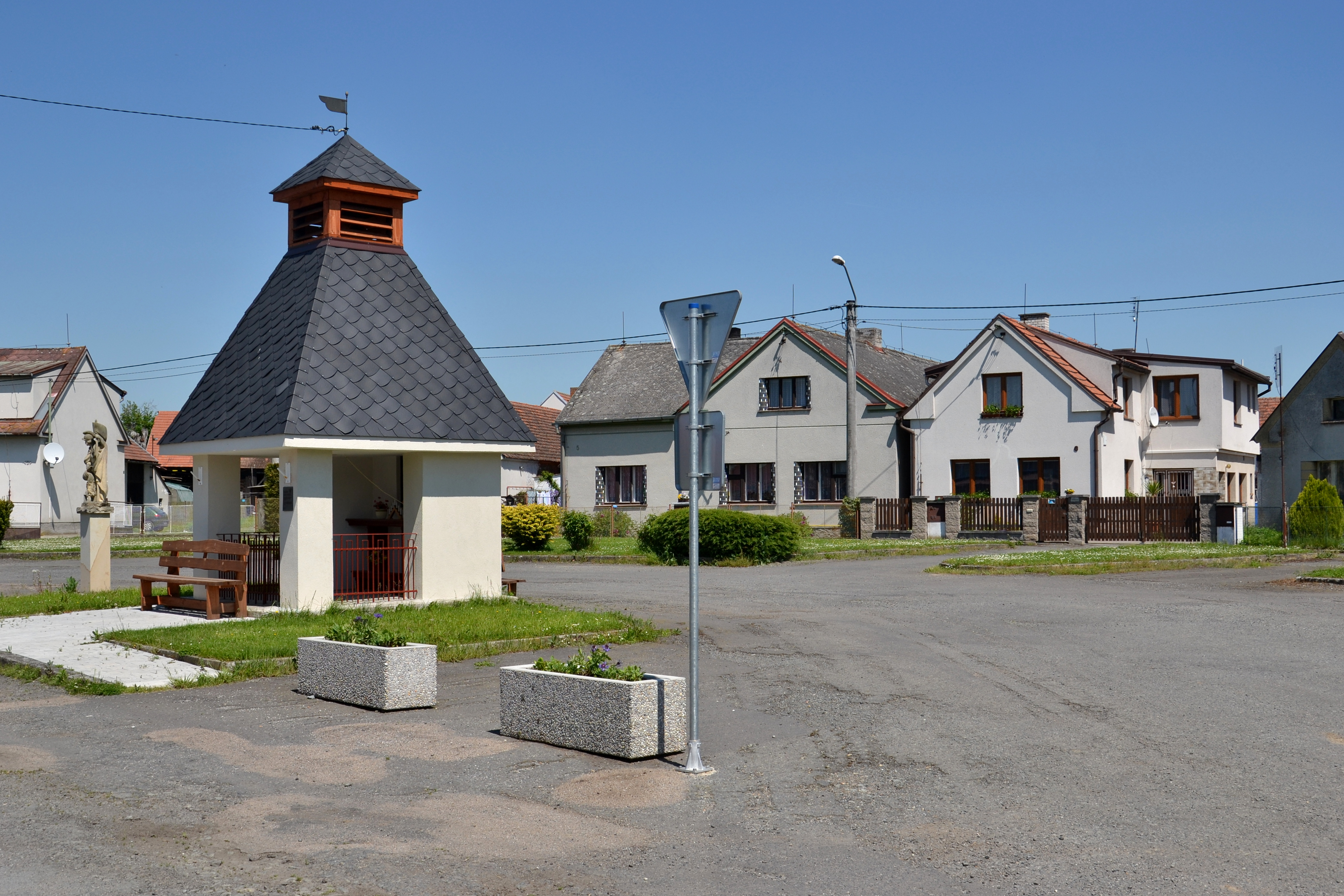
- Centre of Dolní Hradiště with a chapel

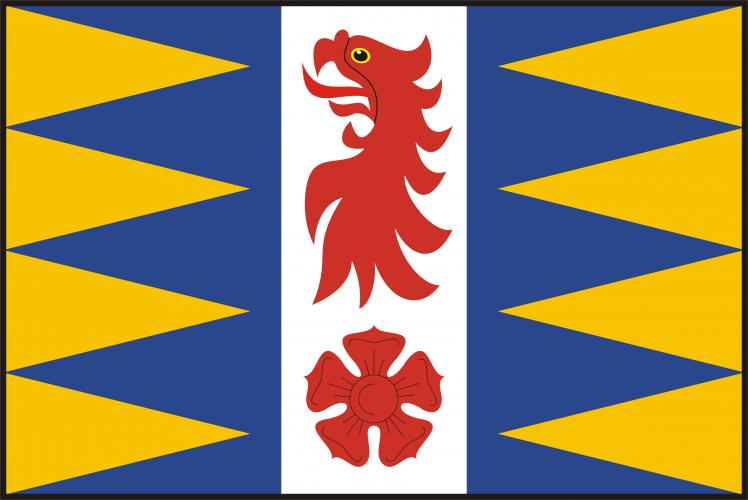
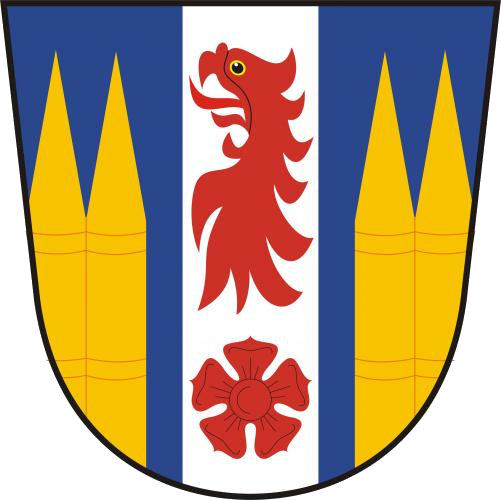
- Flag Coat of arms

- Location in the Czech Republic
- Coordinates: 49°54′50″N 13°29′47″E
- Country: Czech Republic
- Region: Plzeň
- District: Plzeň-North
- First mentioned: 1250

Area
  - Total: 2.67 km^{2} (1.03 sq mi)
- Elevation: 347 m (1,138 ft)

Population (2026-01-01)
  - Total: 74
  - Density: 28/km^{2} (72/sq mi)
- Time zone: UTC+1 (CET)
  - Summer (DST): UTC+2 (CEST)
- Postal code: 331 51
- Website: www.dolnihradiste.cz

Dolní Hradiště is a municipality and village in Plzeň-North District in the Plzeň Region of the Czech Republic. It has about 70 inhabitants.

Dolní Hradiště lies approximately 21 kilometres (13 mi) north-east of Plzeň and 69 km (43 mi) west of Prague.

== Demographics ==
Historical population
Year	Pop.	±%
1869	126	—
1880	136	+7.9%
1890	143	+5.1%
1900	138	−3.5%
1910	131	−5.1%
1921	114	−13.0%
1930	133	+16.7%
1950	78	−41.4%
1961	94	+20.5%
1970	82	−12.8%
1980	66	−19.5%
1991	57	−13.6%
2001	42	−26.3%
2011	46	+9.5%
2021	66	+43.5%
Source: Censuses
