= Veltruby =

- Municipality
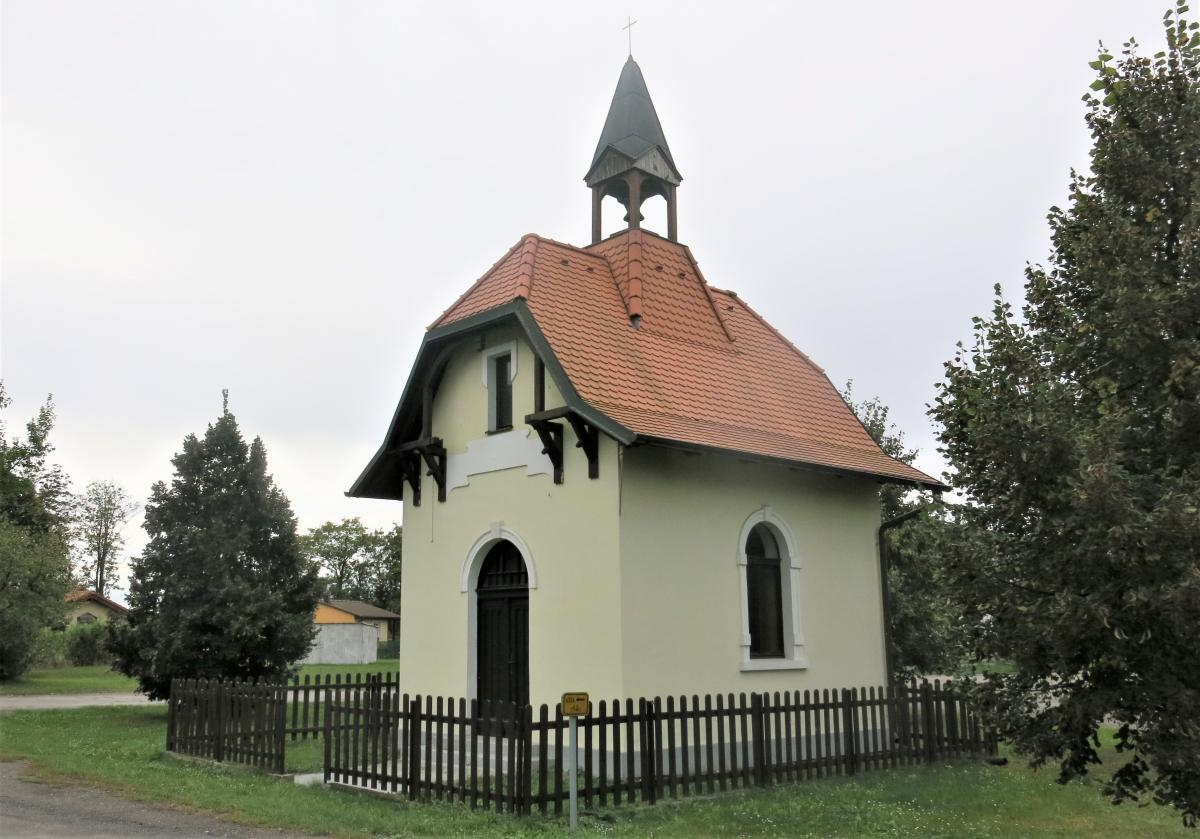
- Chapel of the Visitation of the Virgin Mary

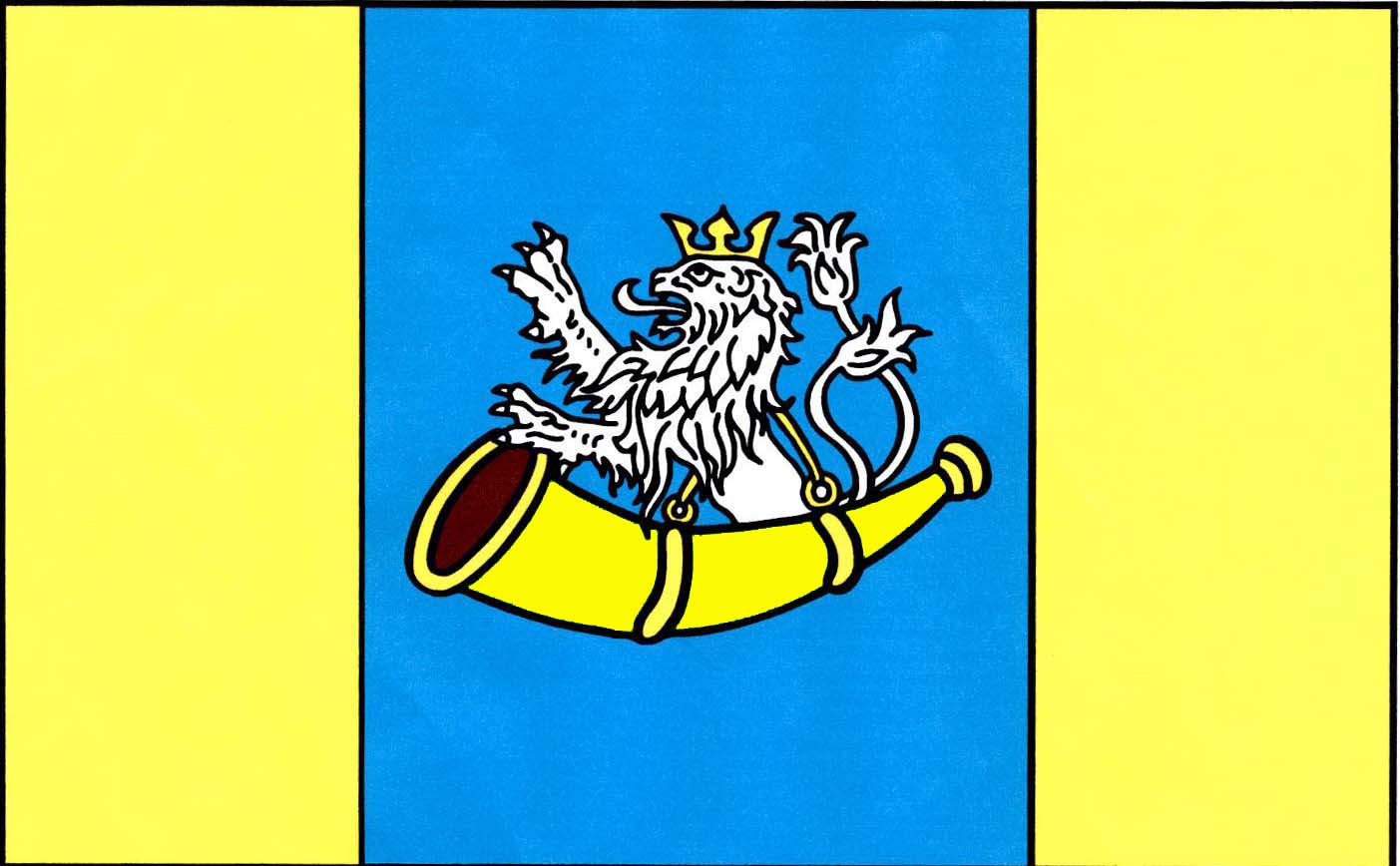
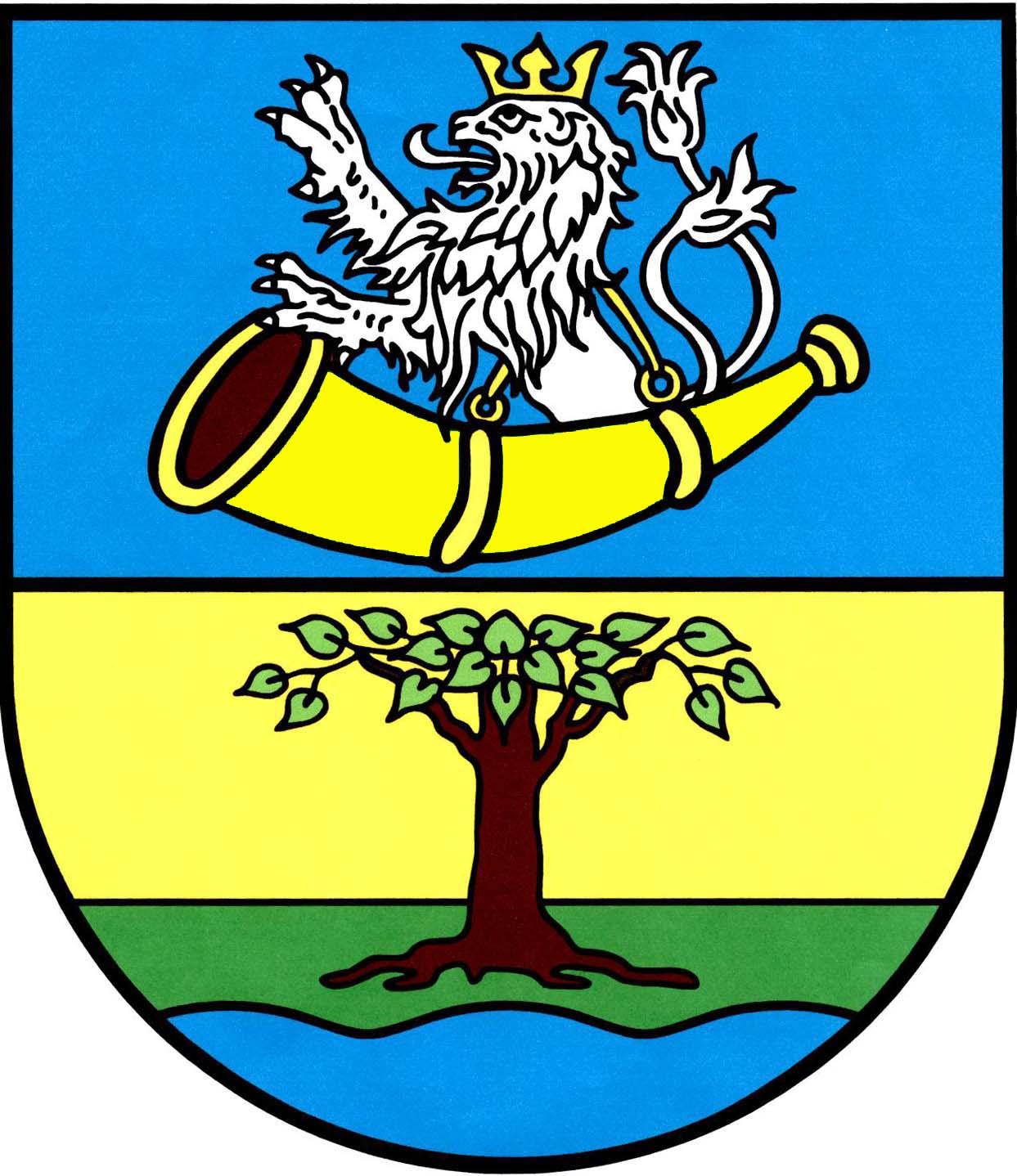
- Flag Coat of arms

- Location in the Czech Republic
- Coordinates: 50°4′14″N 15°11′5″E
- Country: Czech Republic
- Region: Central Bohemian
- District: Kolín
- First mentioned: 1388

Area
  - Total: 9.38 km^{2} (3.62 sq mi)
- Elevation: 193 m (633 ft)

Population (2026-01-01)
  - Total: 1,467
  - Density: 156/km^{2} (405/sq mi)
- Time zone: UTC+1 (CET)
  - Summer (DST): UTC+2 (CEST)
- Postal code: 280 02
- Website: www.veltruby.cz

Veltruby is a municipality and village in Kolín District in the Central Bohemian Region of the Czech Republic. It has about 1,500 inhabitants.

== Administrative division ==
Veltruby consists of two municipal parts (in brackets population according to the 2021 census):

- Veltruby (950)
- Hradišťko I (468)

== Etymology ==
The name is derived from the word veltrubové, which denoted people who velmi troubili (literally 'blow horns a lot', but in Old Czech it also meant figuratively 'idle a lot').

== Geography ==
Veltruby is located about 5 kilometres (3 mi) north of Kolín and 46 km (29 mi) east of Prague. It lies in a flat landscape in the Central Elbe Table. The municipality is situated on the right bank of the Elbe River. There are two artificial lakes, created by flooding sandstone quarries.

== History ==
The first written mention of Veltruby is from 1388. Hradišťko I was first mentioned in 1290.

== Demographics ==
Historical population

Year	Pop.	±%
1869	889	—
1880	1,049	+18.0%
1890	1,125	+7.2%
1900	1,292	+14.8%
1910	1,398	+8.2%

Year	Pop.	±%
1921	1,346	−3.7%
1930	1,425	+5.9%
1950	1,423	−0.1%
1961	1,361	−4.4%
1970	1,335	−1.9%

Year	Pop.	±%
1980	1,323	−0.9%
1991	1,191	−10.0%
2001	1,242	+4.3%
2011	1,317	+6.0%
2021	1,418	+7.7%

Source: Censuses

== Transport ==
Veltruby is located on the railway line Prague–Kolín.

== Sights ==
The main landmark of Veltruby is the Church of the Visitation of the Virgin Mary. It was built in the late Neoclassical style in 1843–1846, but it has a medieval core.

The Chapel of the Visitation of the Virgin Mary in Hradišťko I was built in 1909–1910.
