= Gorodishche, Kichmengsko-Gorodetsky District, Vologda Oblast =

Gorodishche Городище
- Village
- Location within Vologda Oblast Location within Russia
- Coordinates: 59°58′N 45°51′E
- Country: Russia
- Region: Vologda Oblast
- District: Kichmengsko-Gorodetsky District
- Time zone: UTC+3:00

Gorodishche (Russian: Городище) is a rural locality (a village) in Kichmengskoye Rural Settlement, Kichmengsko-Gorodetsky District, Vologda Oblast, Russia. The population was 7 as of 2002.

== Geography ==
Gorodishche is located 9 km southeast of Kichmengsky Gorodok (the district's administrative centre) by road. Bolshoye Chekavino is the nearest rural locality.
