= Gorodishche, Starooskolsky District, Belgorod Oblast =

Gorodishche Городище
- Selo
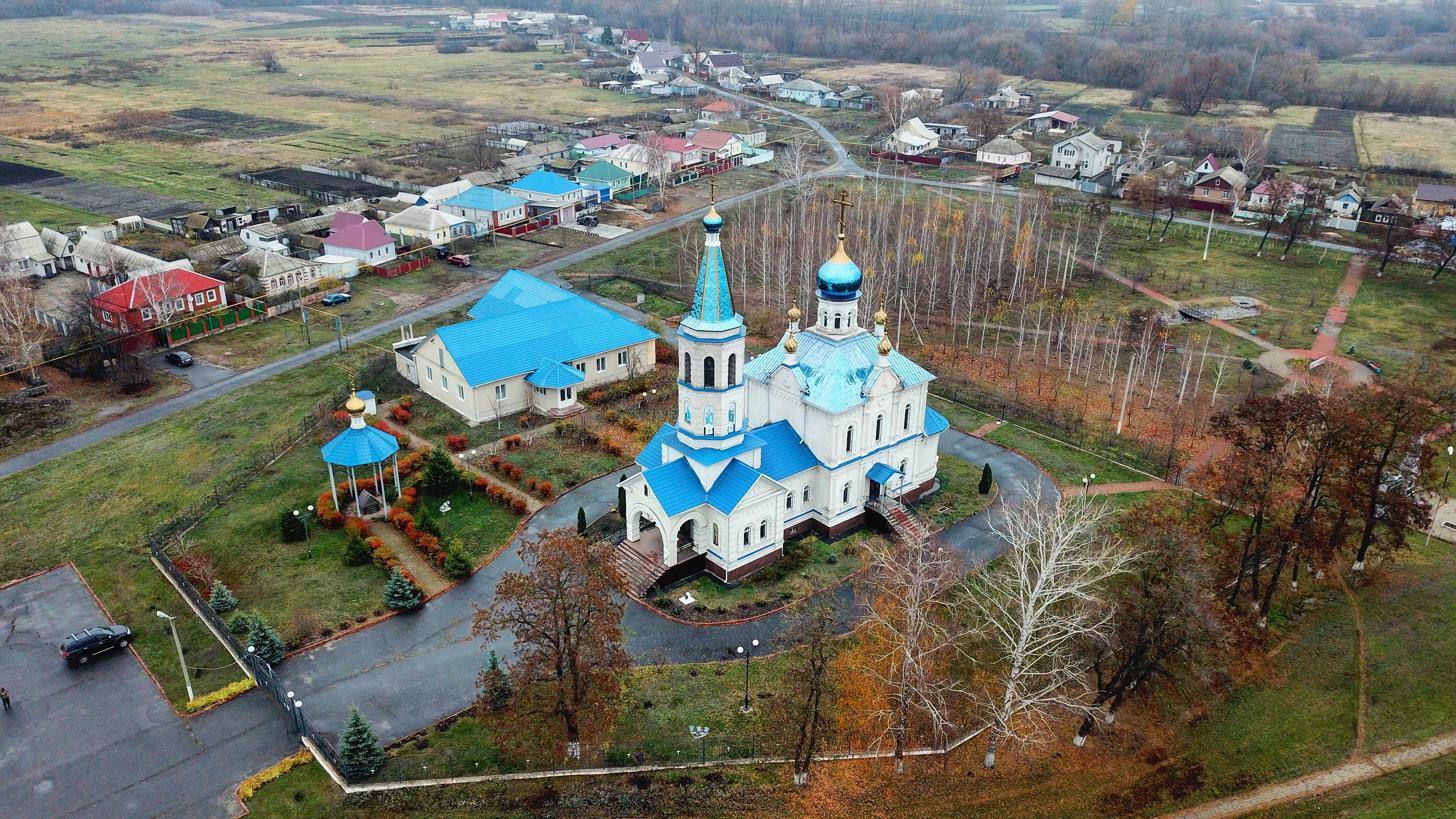
- Aerial view of the Church of Cosmas and Damian in Gorodishche

- Location within Belgorod Oblast Location within Russia
- Coordinates: 51°07′N 38°03′E
- Country: Russia
- Region: Belgorod Oblast
- District: Starooskolsky District
- Time zone: UTC+3:00

Gorodishche (Russian: Городище) is a rural locality (a selo) and the administrative center of Gorodishchensky Selsoviet, Starooskolsky District, Belgorod Oblast, Russia. The population was 3,562 as of 2010. There are 46 streets.

== Geography ==
Gorodishche is located 31 km southeast of Stary Oskol (the district's administrative centre) by road. Soldatskoye is the nearest rural locality.
