= Gorodishche, Vladimir Oblast =

Gorodishche Городище
- Selo
- Location within Vladimir Oblast Location within Russia
- Coordinates: 56°35′N 39°42′E
- Country: Russia
- Region: Vladimir Oblast
- District: Yuryev-Polsky District
- Time zone: UTC+3:00

Gorodishche (Russian: Городище) is a rural locality (a selo) in Krasnoselskoye Rural Settlement, Yuryev-Polsky District, Vladimir Oblast, Russia. The population was 420 as of 2010. There are 5 streets.

== Geography ==
Gorodishche is located 13 km north of Yuryev-Polsky (the district's administrative centre) by road. Yurkovo is the nearest rural locality.
