= Fălcoiu =

- Commune
- Location in Romania
- Coordinates: 44°14′N 24°22′E
- Country: Romania
- County: Olt
- Population (2021-12-01): 3,446
- Time zone: EET/EEST (UTC+2/+3)
- Vehicle reg.: OT

Fălcoiu is a commune in Olt County, Oltenia, Romania. It is composed of three villages: Cioroiașu, Cioroiu and Fălcoiu.

== Natives ==
- Vasile Popa
