= Grădiștea, Vâlcea =

Grădiștea
- Commune
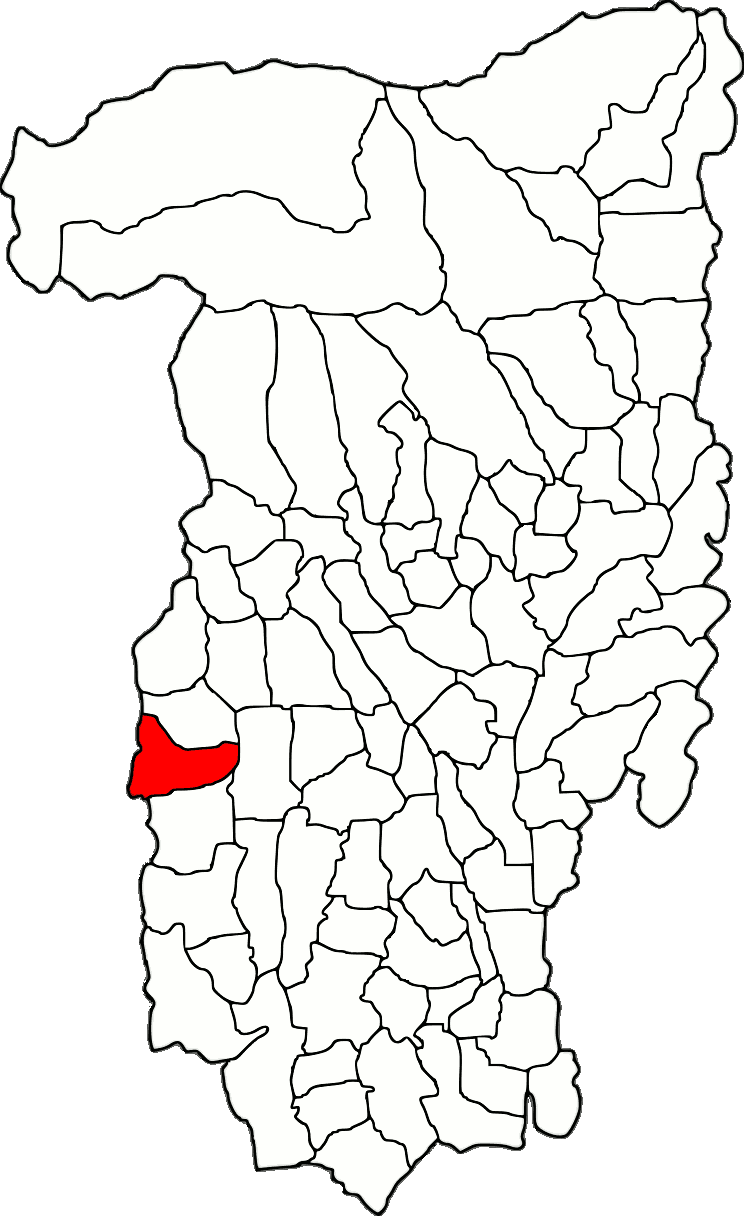
- Location in Vâlcea County

- Location in Romania
- Coordinates: 44°53′N 23°49′E
- Country: Romania
- County: Vâlcea
- Area: 48.14 km^{2} (18.59 sq mi)
- Population (2021-12-01): 2,332
  - Density: 48.44/km^{2} (125.5/sq mi)
- Time zone: UTC+02:00 (EET)
  - Summer (DST): UTC+03:00 (EEST)
- Vehicle reg.: VL

Grădiștea is a commune located in Vâlcea County, Oltenia, Romania. It is composed of nine villages: Diaconești, Dobricea, Grădiștea, Linia, Obislavu, Străchinești, Turburea, Țuțuru, and Valea Grădiștei.

The Grădiștea gas field is located on the territory of the commune.
