= Horodyszcze =

Horodyszcze may refer to the following places:

== Belarus ==
- Horodyszcze, Baranavichy District
- Horodyszcze, Pinsk District

== Poland ==
- Horodyszcze, Gmina Wisznice, Biała County in Lublin Voivodeship
- Horodyszcze, Chełm County in Lublin Voivodeship
- Horodyszcze, Hrubieszów County in Lublin Voivodeship
- Horodyszcze-Kolonia, Chełm County in Lublin Voivodeship

== See also ==
- Horodyshche (disambiguation)
