= Horodiște =

Horodiște may refer to:

- Horodiște, Călărași, a commune in Călărași district, Moldova
- Horodiște, Dondușeni, a commune in Dondușeni district, Moldova
- Horodiște, Rezina, a commune in Rezina district, and its village of Slobozia-Horodişte, Moldova
- Horodiște, Rîșcani, a commune in Rîșcani district, Moldova

== See also ==
- Horodiștea (disambiguation)
