= Slatina, Romania =

Slatina
- Municipality
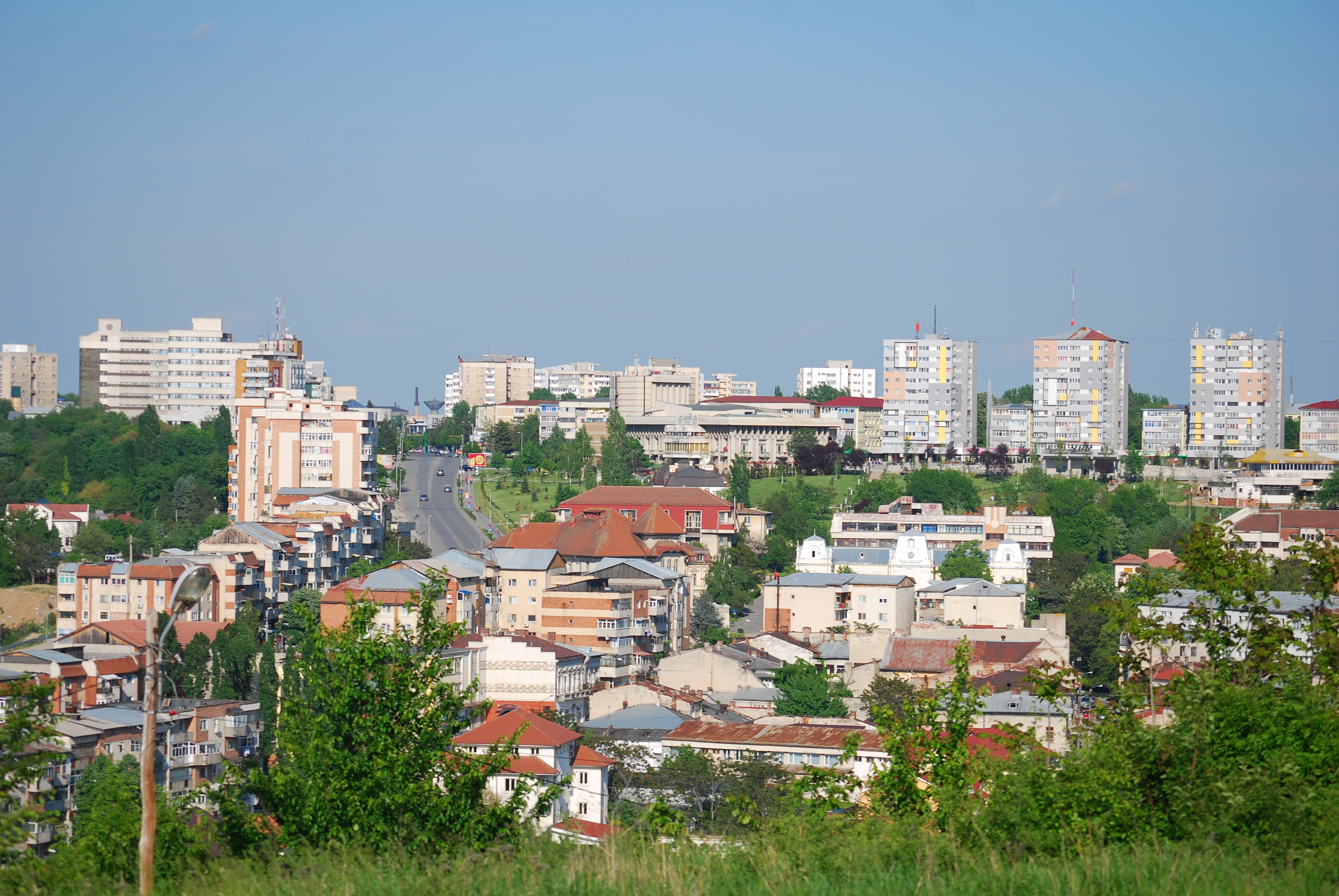
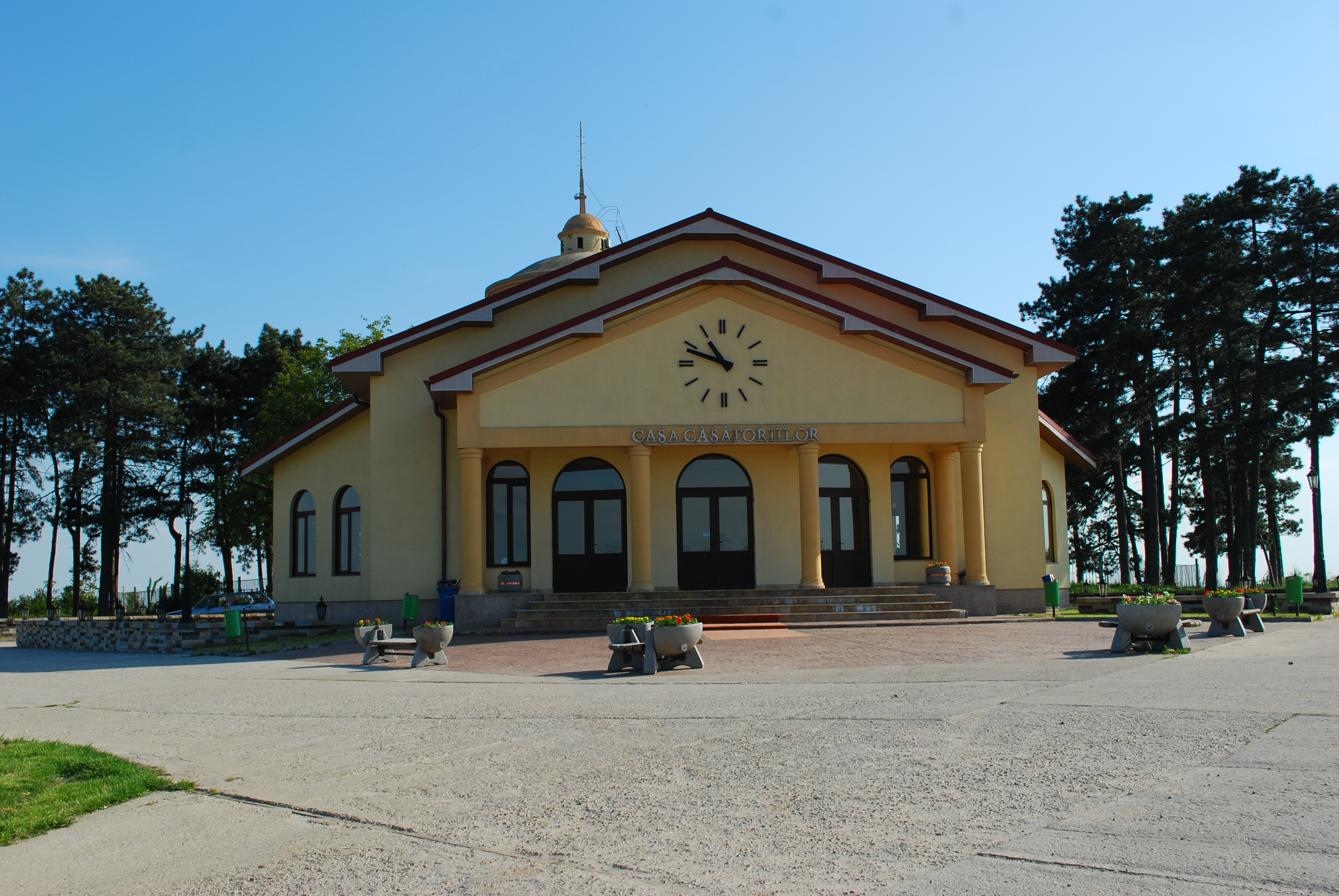
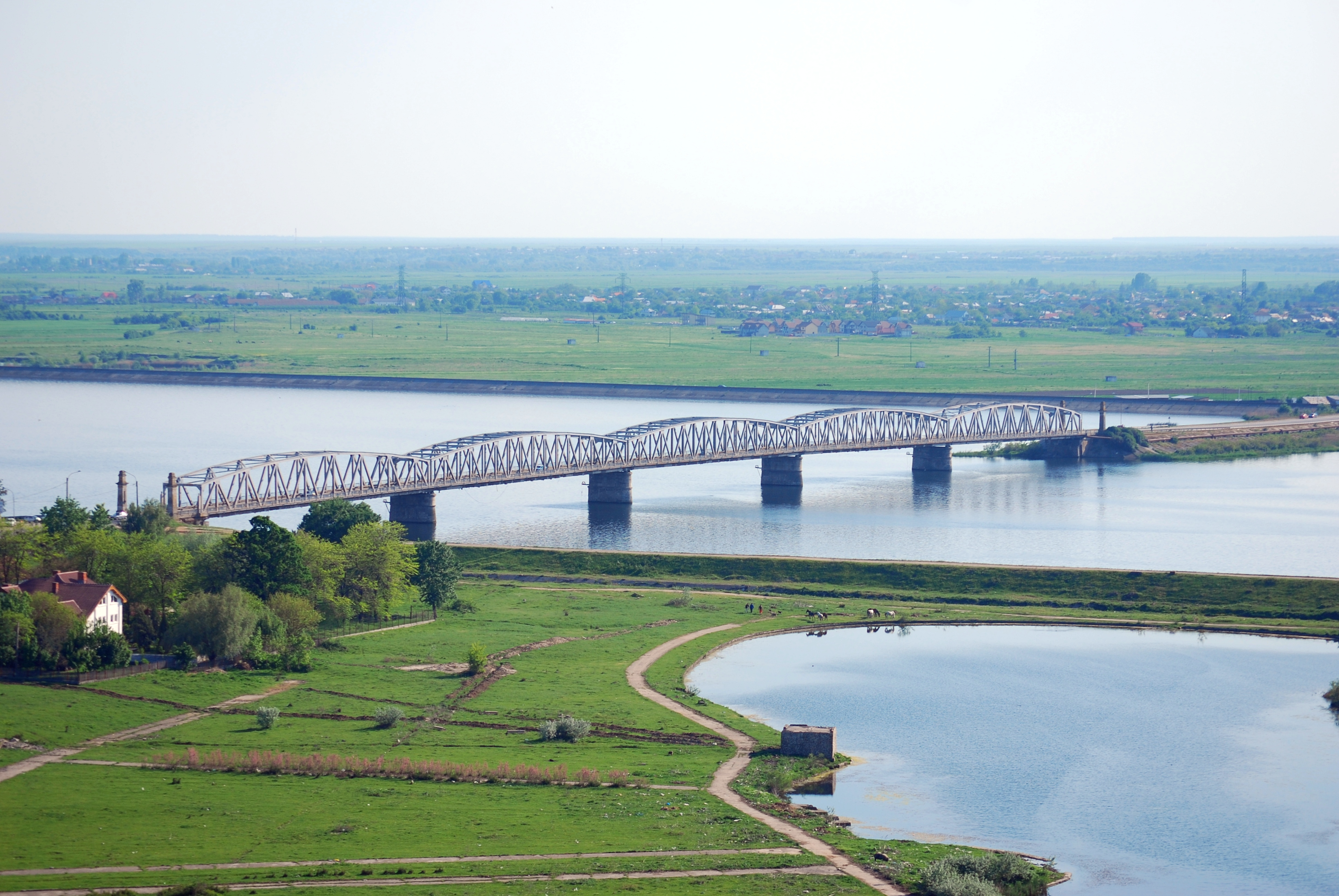
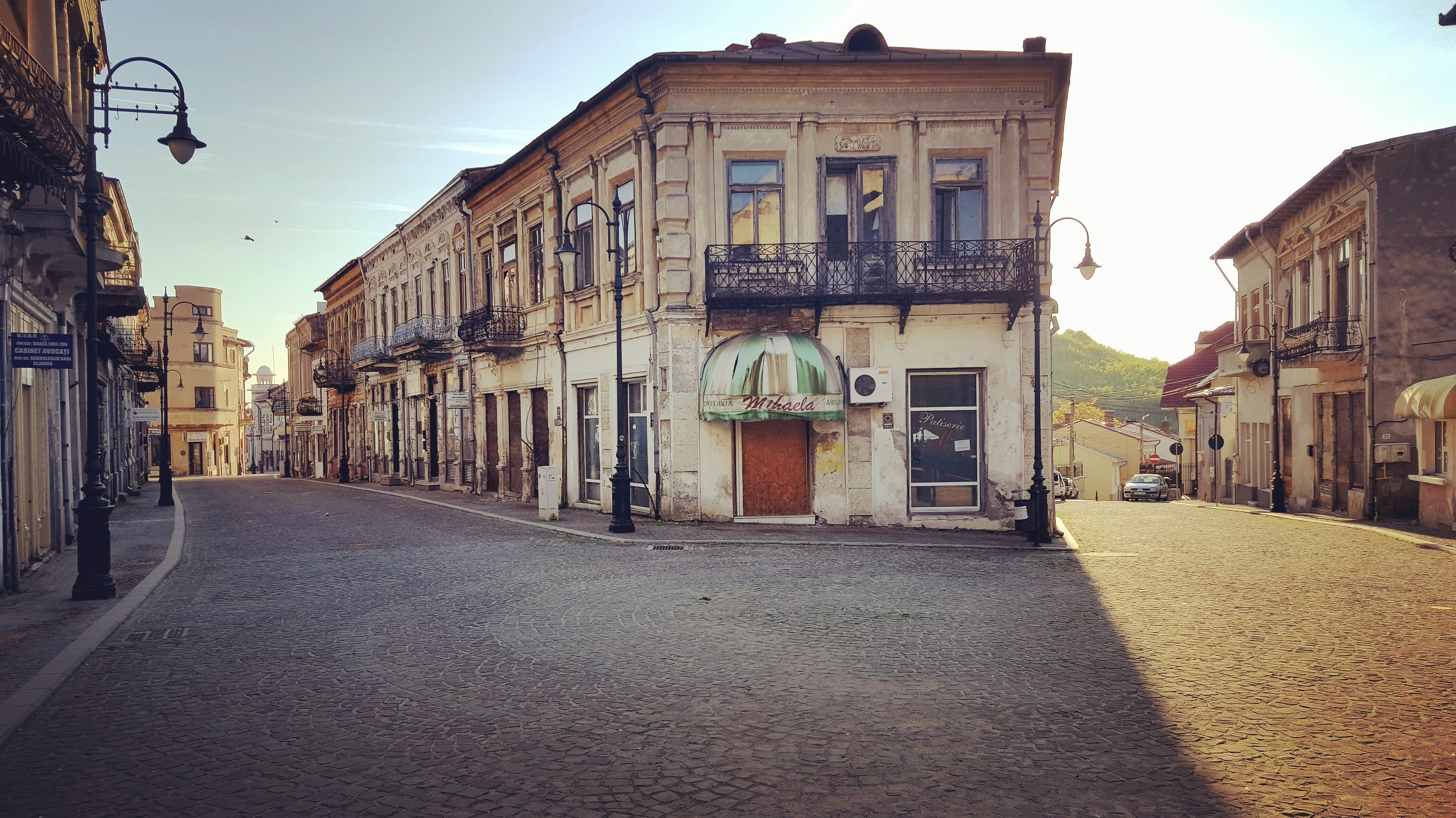
- City center viewed from Grădiște Hill House of Weddings on Grădiște Hill Lotru Bridge over the Olt River Old town

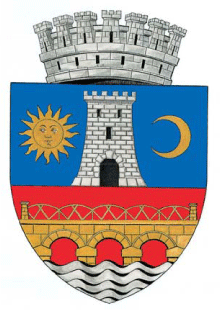
- Coat of arms

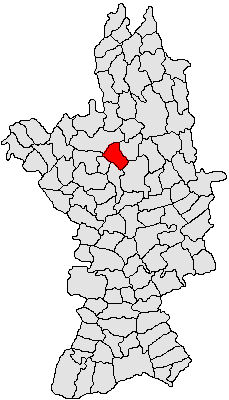
- Location in Olt County

- Location in Romania
- Coordinates: 44°25′47″N 24°21′51″E
- Country: Romania
- County: Olt

Government
  - Mayor (2024–2028): Mario De Mezzo (PNL)
- Area: 53.93 km^{2} (20.82 sq mi)
- Elevation: 155 m (509 ft)
- Population (2021-12-01): 63,487
  - Density: 1,177/km^{2} (3,049/sq mi)
- Time zone: UTC+02:00 (EET)
  - Summer (DST): UTC+03:00 (EEST)
- Postal code: 230002–230128
- Area code: (+40) 02 49
- Vehicle reg.: OT
- Website: www.primariaslatina.ro

Slatina (Romanian pronunciation: [ˈslatina]) is the capital city of Olt County, Romania, on the river Olt. It is located in the south of Romania, on the eastern side of the river Olt, in the historical region of Muntenia. The population was 63,487 in 2021; the urban area has around 85,000 inhabitants. It is an important industrial center.

The city administers one village, Cireașov.

== History ==
Historical population
Year	Pop.	±%
1912	9,825	—
1930	11,243	+14.4%
1948	13,136	+16.8%
1956	13,381	+1.9%
1966	19,250	+43.9%
1977	44,892	+133.2%
1992	85,168	+89.7%
2002	79,171	−7.0%
2011	70,293	−11.2%
2021	63,487	−9.7%
Source: Census data

The town of Slatina was first mentioned on January 20, 1368 in an official document issued by Vladislav I Vlaicu, Prince of Wallachia. The document stated that merchants from the Transylvanian city of Brașov would not pay customs when passing through Slatina. The word Slatina is of Slavic origin, and means "marsh, swamp, watery plain".

== Economy ==
Alro Slatina, the largest aluminum producing factories in Southeastern Europe, is located in the city. Other companies based in Slatina include ALPROM (which, like ALRO, is a subsidiary of VIMETCOGROUP), Altur (engine set manufacturer), Pirelli Tires Romania (tire-manufacturer), Steel Cord Romania (steel cord for tires), Artrom Steel Tubes (seamless steel tubes), Prysmian (electronic and electric wires and cables) and Benteler.

One of the oldest private businesses in Romania is the Slatina-based pastry shop Atletul Albanez ("The Albanian Athlete").

== Sport ==
There is an association football club in Slatina, CSM Slatina, that plays in Liga II (the second league of Romania).

The women's handball section of CSM Slatina also represent the city in the top handball league of Romania.

== Natives ==
- Petre S. Aurelian - politician
- Aurelia Brădeanu - handball player
- Gheorghe Craioveanu - football player
- Ionel Dănciulescu - football player
- Ionuț Luțu - football player
- Felicia Filip - operatic soprano
- Iulian Filipescu - football player
- Mădălina Diana Ghenea - actress and model
- Eugène Ionesco - playwright
- Claudiu Niculescu - football player
- Monica Niculescu - tennis player
