= Găneasa, Olt =

Găneasa
- Commune
- Seal

- Location in Romania
- Coordinates: 44°24′N 24°17′E
- Country: Romania
- County: Olt
- Population (2021-12-01): 3,498
- Time zone: UTC+02:00 (EET)
  - Summer (DST): UTC+03:00 (EEST)
- Vehicle reg.: OT

Găneasa is a commune in Olt County, Oltenia, Romania, in the vicinity of Piatra-Olt town. It is composed of five villages: Dranovățu, Găneasa, Grădiștea, Izvoru, and Oltișoru.

== Natives ==
- Mircea Damian
