= Żmudź =

Żmudź may refer to:

- Polish name for Samogitia, now a region of Lithuania
- Bishop of Żmudź
- Roman Catholic Diocese of Żmudź
- Chełm County, Lublin Voivodeship, in now eastern Poland:
  - Żmudź, Lublin Voivodeship
  - Gmina Żmudź
  - Żmudź-Kolonia
