= Gałęzów =

Gałęzów may refer to the following places:

- Gałęzów, Chełm County in Lublin Voivodeship (east Poland)
- Gałęzów, Lublin County in Lublin Voivodeship (east Poland)
- Gałęzów, Pomeranian Voivodeship (north Poland)
