= Poczekajka =

Poczekajka may refer to:

- Poczekajka, Gmina Ruda-Huta, a village in Chełm County, Lublin Voivodeship, Poland
- Poczekajka, Gmina Żmudź, a village in Chełm County
