= Kazimierówka =

Kazimierówka may refer to the following places:

- Kazimierówka, Chełm County in Lublin Voivodeship (east Poland)
- Kazimierówka, Gmina Tyszowce, Tomaszów County in Lublin Voivodeship (east Poland)
- Kazimierówka, Podlaskie Voivodeship (north-east Poland)
- Kazimierówka, Masovian Voivodeship (east-central Poland)
- Kazimierówka, Silesian Voivodeship
