= Wojciech Komorowski =

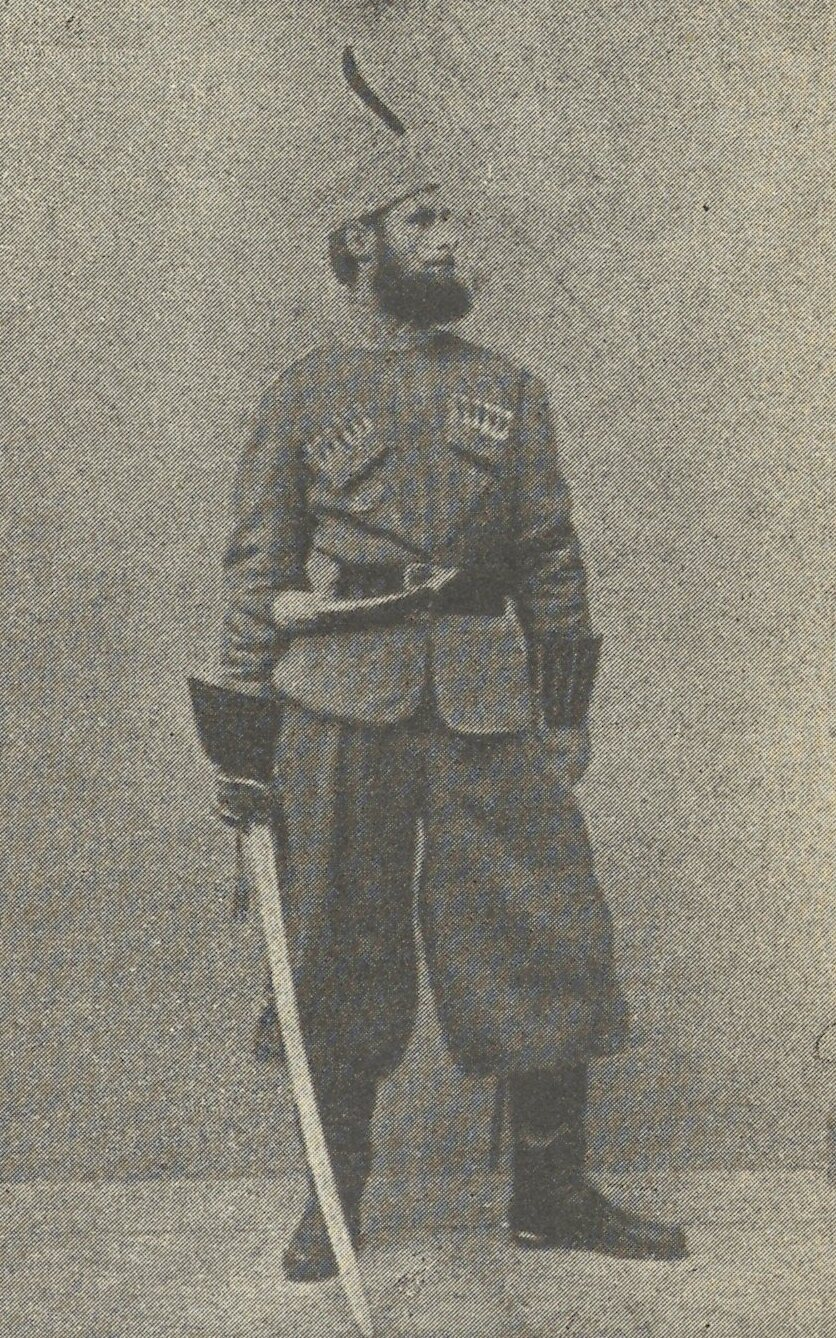
- Born: 13 April 1839; St. Christoph am Arlberg, Austro-Hungarian Empire
- Died: 20 January 1879 (aged 39) Lwów, Congress Poland, Russian Empire
- Allegiance: Austro-Hungarian Empire (1859–1860); Polish National Government (1863–1864)
- Service years: 1859–1860; 1863–1864
- Rank: Captain
- Conflicts: Second Italian War of Independence; Battle of Montebello; January Uprising; Battle of Poryck
- Awards: Order of the Iron Crown (Austria)

Wojciech Komorowski, born in Austro-Hungarian Empire, took part in the Second Italian War of Independence and in 1863 joined the Polish insurgents, where he distinguished himself during the expedition to Poryck. After the fall of the January Uprising, he led a quiet life on a farm and died in 1879 in Lwów at the age of just 39.

== Biography ==
=== Family ===
Wojciech was the son of Count Edward Adam Piotr Komorowski and Krystyna Hildprandt und zu Ottenhausen. Wojciech's brother Karol Józef Edward, who was a year older, was a Rittmaster in the Austrian army, and from 1879 a chamberlain to Emperor Franz Joseph I.

With his wife, Henryka of Mierów, he had four children: Jerzy, Maria Magdalena, Stefan and Adam.

=== Service in the Austrian army ===
From 1859 to 1860, as a lieutenant in the Austrian army, he fought in the Second Italian War of Independence as part of the 3rd infantry regiment. He distinguished himself in the battle of Montebello, for which he received the Order of the Iron Crown. After the war, he left active duty and settled down to farming. On June 10, 1860, he married Henryka of Mierów, and in 1860 they had a son, Jerzy, and in 1862 a daughter, Maria Magdalena.

=== January Uprising ===
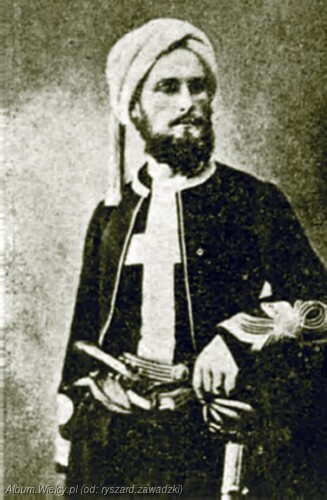
Wojciech Komorowski during January Uprising

In February 1863, he joined Marian Langiewicz's troops, the Zouaves of Death regiment formed by François de Rochebrune. As an Austrian officer, he was given command of the 2nd company with the rank of captain. He served the entire campaign under Langiewicz's command and was wounded in the Battle of Grochowiska on March 18, 1863.

After crossing the Austrian border of Galicia, Komorowski received orders from the national government to form a new 800-man detachment, with which, as a colonel, he was to return around May 15, 1863 to the Congress Kingdom from the Kraków area. For unknown reasons, it is not until later, several months later, that the efforts to form the detachment conducted in the vicinity of Lwów. The unit, according to a resolution at a meeting in Krakow in late September 1863, was to be used in a prolonged assault on the Lublin province to drive the enemy out of it and create an insurgent base. Regiments IV, VI and VII were to enter Volhynia and retreat to Lublin Province. However, the plan failed due to the lack of timing of the actions of the various units and demoralization in Michał Heydenreich's forces as a result of feuds and insubordination among soldiers. Unable to control the situation, Michał Heydenreich also handed over command of Regiments IV and VI to Wojciech Komorowski with instructions to enter Volhynia. On November 1, 1863 Komorowski, with a detachment of several hundred men, clashed with a Russian detachment and captured the abandoned Poryck. On November 2, the insurgents were encircled by the Russians, but broke through close to the border with Austrian Galicia with the intention of proceeding to the Lublin region. Just over the border there was another clash with Russian troops, but the unit managed to cross the border, stopping the Russians from entering Galicia. The price was the surrender of part of the unit before the Austrian troops and the dispersal of the rest.

Komorowski gathered some of the insurgents who took part in the expedition to Poryck, formed them into a cavalry unit and led them to the Congress Kingdom, but this unit was broken up on January 17, 1864 near Stara Wieś.

Wojciech Komorowski was held in high esteem by his soldiers, including receiving from them a gold ring with the inscription: "The seventh division to its leader".

=== Final years ===
After the fighting ended, Wojciech Komorowski managed to return to farming and family life. In 1867 he became a member of the Krosno District Council. He died in Lwów on January 20, 1879.
