= Zadębie =

Zadębie may refer to the following villages in Poland:

- Zadębie, Lublin County in Lublin Voivodeship (east Poland)
- Zadębie, Parczew County in Lublin Voivodeship (east Poland)
- Zadębie, Grójec County in Masovian Voivodeship (east-central Poland)
- Zadębie, Piaseczno County in Masovian Voivodeship (east-central Poland)
- Zadębie, Pomeranian Voivodeship (north Poland)
