= Bieling =

Bieling is a surname. Notable people with the surname include:

- Herman Bieling (1887–1964), Dutch painter, sculptor, and graphic artist
- John Bieling (1869–1948), American tenor singer
- Roberta Bieling (born 1975), German journalist

== See also ==
- Bielin (disambiguation)
