= Marysin, Gmina Bychawa =

Marysin
- Village
- Location within Poland
- Coordinates: 51°00′07″N 22°33′41″E
- Country: Poland
- Voivodeship: Lublin
- County: Lublin
- Gmina: Bychawa

Marysin [maˈrɨɕin] is a village in the administrative district of Gmina Bychawa, within Lublin County, Lublin Voivodeship, in eastern Poland.
