= Bielin =

Bielin refers to the following places in Poland:

- Bielin, Lublin Voivodeship
- Bielin, West Pomeranian Voivodeship
