= Urszulin, Lublin County =

Urszulin
- Village
- Location within Poland
- Coordinates: 50°57′55″N 22°36′57″E
- Country: Poland
- Voivodeship: Lublin
- County: Lublin
- Gmina: Bychawa

Urszulin (Polish pronunciation: [urˈʂulin]) is a village in the administrative district of Gmina Bychawa, within Lublin County, Lublin Voivodeship, in eastern Poland.
