= Józwów =

- Village
- Location within Poland
- Coordinates: 50°57′25″N 22°29′13″E
- Country: Poland
- Voivodeship: Lublin
- County: Lublin
- Gmina: Bychawa

Józwów [ˈjuzvuf] is a village in the administrative district of Gmina Bychawa, within Lublin County, Lublin Voivodeship, in eastern Poland.
