= Skawinek =

- Village
- Location within Poland
- Coordinates: 51°00′17″N 22°34′40″E
- Country: Poland
- Voivodeship: Lublin
- County: Lublin
- Gmina: Bychawa

Skawinek [skaˈvinɛk] is a village in the administrative district of Gmina Bychawa, within Lublin County, Lublin Voivodeship, in eastern Poland. In 1993, a small flood ruined a marginal amount of cropland.
