= Bychawka Trzecia-Kolonia =

- Village
- Location within Poland
- Coordinates: 51°3′51″N 22°32′19″E
- Country: Poland
- Voivodeship: Lublin
- County: Lublin
- Gmina: Bychawa

Bychawka Trzecia-Kolonia [bɨˈxafka ˈtʂɛt͡ɕa kɔˈlɔɲa] is a village in the administrative district of Gmina Bychawa, within Lublin County, Lublin Voivodeship, in eastern Poland.
