= Romanów, Lublin County =

Romanów
- Village
- Location within Poland
- Coordinates: 51°00′18″N 22°36′59″E
- Country: Poland
- Voivodeship: Lublin
- County: Lublin
- Gmina: Bychawa
- Time zone: UTC+1 (CET)
  - Summer (DST): UTC+2 (CEST)
- Vehicle registration: LUB

Romanów [rɔˈmanuf] is a village in the administrative district of Gmina Bychawa, within Lublin County, Lublin Voivodeship, in eastern Poland.

== History ==
Four Polish citizens were murdered by Nazi Germany in the village during World War II.
