= Rudno, Chełm County =

Rudno
- Village
- Location within Poland
- Coordinates: 51°0′9″N 23°41′36″E
- Country: Poland
- Voivodeship: Lublin
- County: Chełm
- Gmina: Żmudź

Rudno [ˈrudnɔ] is a village in the administrative district of Gmina Żmudź, within Chełm County, Lublin Voivodeship, in eastern Poland.
