= Gałęzów-Kolonia Druga =

- Village
- Location within Poland
- Coordinates: 51°01′38″N 22°37′14″E
- Country: Poland
- Voivodeship: Lublin
- County: Lublin
- Gmina: Bychawa
- Time zone: UTC+1 (CET)
  - Summer (DST): UTC+2 (CEST)

Gałęzów-Kolonia Druga [ɡaˈwɛ̃zuf kɔˈlɔɲa ˈdruɡa] is a village in the administrative district of Gmina Bychawa, within Lublin County, Lublin Voivodeship, in eastern Poland.

== History ==
Three Polish citizens were murdered by Nazi Germany in the village during World War II.
