= Wola Duża, Lublin County =

Wola Duża
- Village
- Location within Poland
- Coordinates: 51°1′N 22°35′E
- Country: Poland
- Voivodeship: Lublin
- County: Lublin
- Gmina: Bychawa

Wola Duża [ˈvɔla ˈduʐa] is a village in the administrative district of Gmina Bychawa, within Lublin County, Lublin Voivodeship, in eastern Poland.
