= Kosarzew Dolny-Kolonia =

- Village
- Location within Poland
- Coordinates: 50°59′42″N 22°36′08″E
- Country: Poland
- Voivodeship: Lublin
- County: Lublin
- Gmina: Bychawa

Kosarzew Dolny-Kolonia [kɔˈsaʐɛf ˈdɔlnɨ kɔˈlɔɲa] is a village in the administrative district of Gmina Bychawa, within Lublin County, Lublin Voivodeship, in eastern Poland.
