= Majdan, Gmina Żmudź =

Majdan
- Village
- Location within Poland
- Coordinates: 51°3′59″N 23°39′38″E
- Country: Poland
- Voivodeship: Lublin
- County: Chełm
- Gmina: Żmudź

Majdan (Polish pronunciation: [ˈmajdan]) is a village in the administrative district of Gmina Żmudź, within Chełm County, Lublin Voivodeship, in eastern Poland.
