= Bychawka Druga =

- Village
- Location within Poland
- Coordinates: 51°3′8″N 22°31′36″E
- Country: Poland
- Voivodeship: Lublin
- County: Lublin
- Gmina: Bychawa

Bychawka Druga [bɨˈxafka ˈdruɡa] is a village in the administrative district of Gmina Bychawa, within Lublin County, Lublin Voivodeship, in eastern Poland.
