= Stanisław Brzozowski (philosopher) =

Polish philosopher (1878–1911)

Stanisław Leopold Brzozowski
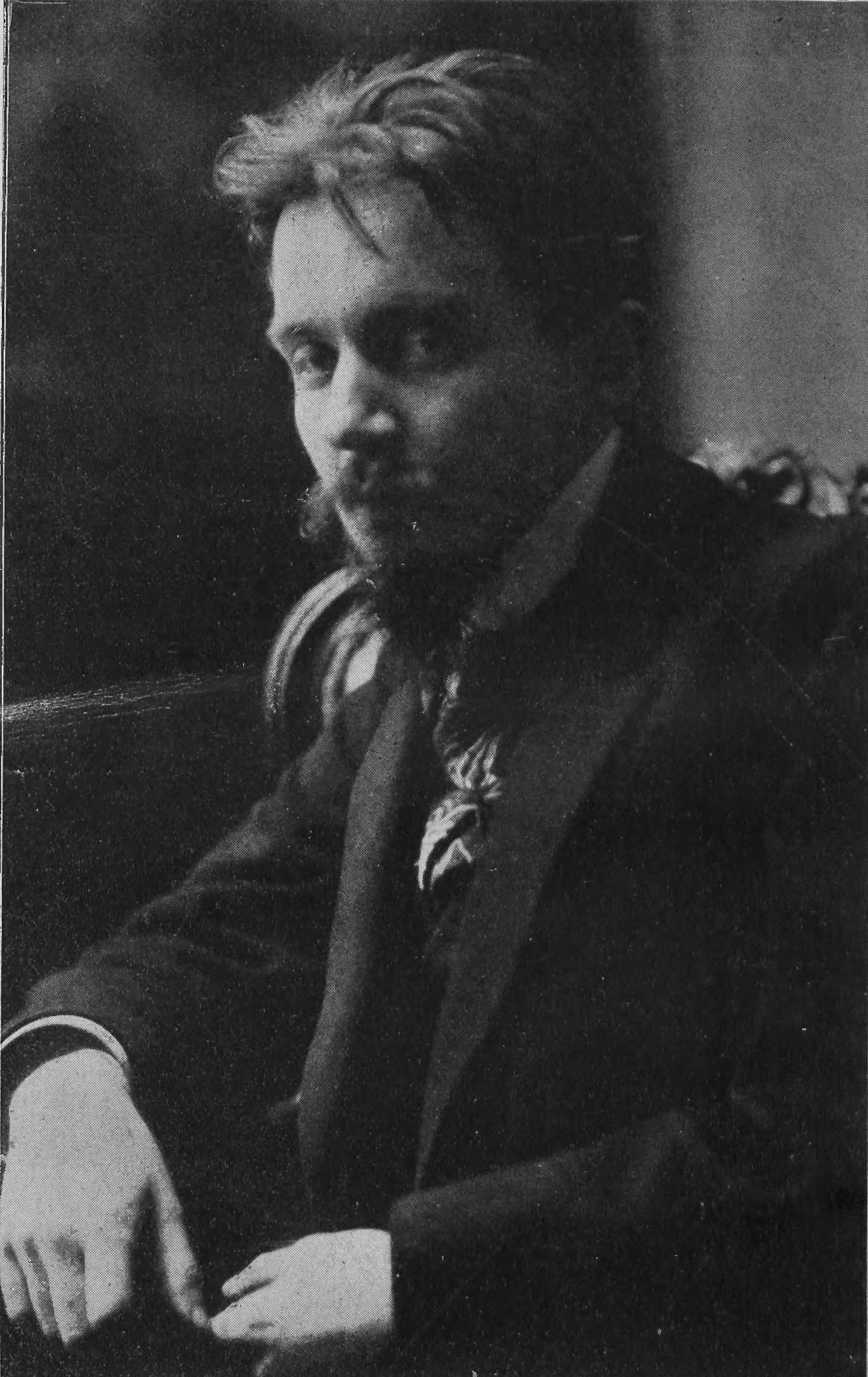
- Brzozowski in 1910
- Born: 28 June 1878; Maziarnia, Congress Poland, Russian Empire
- Died: 30 April 1911 (aged 32); Florence, Kingdom of Italy

Philosophical work
- Era: 20th-century philosophy
- Region: Western philosophy Polish philosophy
- School: Young Poland; Neo-romanticism
- Main interests: Literary criticism, political philosophy
- Notable ideas: Połaniecczyzna

Stanisław Leopold Brzozowski (Polish: [staˈɲiswaf bʐɔˈzɔfskʲi]; 28 June 1878 – 30 April 1911) was a Polish philosopher, writer, publicist, literary and theatre critic. Considered to be an important Polish philosopher, Brzozowski is known for his concept of the philosophy of labour, rooted in Marxism. Besides Karl Marx, among his major inspirations were Georges Sorel, Friedrich Nietzsche, Henri Bergson, Thomas Carlyle, and John Henry Newman. Brzozowski's core idea was based on the concept of a socially engaged intellectual (artist). Although he was in favour of historical materialism, he strongly argued against its deterministic interpretation. In his philosophical approaches, Brzozowski stated his opposition to all concepts that would commodify a human being.

Polish intellectuals (Czesław Miłosz, Andrzej Walicki, Leszek Kołakowski) have stressed that Brzozowski's interpretations of Marx's early writings, not widely known at the time of their formulation, largely anticipated those presented later by György Lukács and Antonio Gramsci.

== Life and career ==
Leopold Stanisław Leon Brzozowski was born in 1878 in Maziarnia, a village near Chełm. He grew up in an impoverished gentry family, but attended private schools, which allowed him to enroll in the Faculty of Natural Sciences of the University of Warsaw in 1896. In 1897 Brzozowski was involved in student riots against Russian professors teaching at the university. As a consequence, Brzozowski and many other students were expelled from the university for a period of one year. Brzozowski then led the student organization Bratniak, established to maintain financial support for the expelled students. To help his father, who suffered from a fatal illness, Brzozowski decided to use the organization's funds. Although he had promised himself to give the money back as soon as possible, his embezzlement was discovered. The arbitration panel of the fellow members excluded Brzozowski from the activities of the organization for three years. In the same year (1898), he was imprisoned as a result of investigations into the secret activities of the Society for People's Education.

Beginning in the autumn of 1898, Brzozowski suffered heavily from tuberculosis, a consequence of the time spent in prison. To recuperate, he went to a sanatorium in Otwock. In 1900 he met there Antonina Kolberg and they married the next year. In 1903 Brzozowski's only child, Anna Irena, was born. The health problems continued, and to receive more intensive medical care, in 1905 he traveled to Italy. In 1906 he went to Italy again and resided in Florence until his death there in 1911. The last few years of Brzozowski's life, although spent in gradually worsening health and material conditions, were the most productive. During that time he wrote his opus magnum – the novel Płomienie (The Flames) – a response to Demons by Fyodor Dostoyevsky, as well as important books concerning Brzozowski's philosophical and cultural program: Idee. Wstęp do filozofii dojrzałości dziejowej (Ideas: An introduction to the philosophy of historical maturity) and Legenda Młodej Polski (The legend of Young Poland).

== Intellectual profile ==
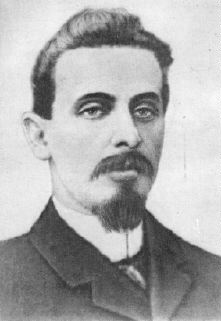
Brzozowski

Brzozowski was an influential critic of Polish social and philosophical thought, an analyst of literature, and a piercing observer of Polish and European everyday life. He was an unambiguous critic of the traditionalism and provincialism of the main currents of 19th century Polish literature. In particular, Brzozowski was a strong opponent of historical novels, such as those written by the Nobel Prize winner Henryk Sienkiewicz. Brzozowski's radical attacks on Sienkiewicz's works made him a persona non grata in Polish artistic circles.

Brzozowski held a unique position as an astute critic of Polish contemporary culture, known as Young Poland (Polish modernism) or neo-romanticism. His Legenda Młodej Polski represents the most comprehensive denunciation of those forms of the Polish mind, which, in Brzozowski's words, represent "the delusion of cultural consciousness."

== Connection of Marxism and religion ==
Concerning his philosophical heritage, Brzozowski tended to experience rather radical shifts in his world-view as a result of subsequent readings. His first important philosophical inspiration was Friedrich Nietzsche and his notion of historical sense, which Brzozowski found particularly valuable. After focusing on Nietzsche, Brzozowski moved closer towards Immanuel Kant, which eventually enabled him to develop his philosophy on the Marxist basis. Besides providing many vital inspirations, Marxism played a central role in Brzozowski's intellectual development, and for the longest period of his short life he was a Marxist thinker. His interpretation of Karl Marx's thought was anti-naturalist and anti-positivist. Brzozowski was an ardent critic of Friedrich Engels and his role in developing Marxist thought. He accused Engels of 'vulgar determinism' and leading Marxism towards naive and reductionist perspective of 'economic necessity'. Finally, he developed his own philosophical program called the philosophy of labour that emphasized the role of human activity in creating and re-creating the reality. This was a concept rejecting reification and alienation of human acts and, according to Brzozowski, was the natural expansion of key Marxist ideas.

In his philosophy Brzozowski focused on subjective factors of work: on the quality of human will and on cohesion and strength of the live social bond determining this quality. He thought that the examination of work from the perspective of experience acquired in the process of its performance, or its "internal" analysis, made it possible to prove that the ultimate basis of work and its products arising in human awareness as the "objectively" given world, was subjective physical effort, maintained by the strength of human will. This effort, in its appropriate level and progress, depends on other forms of labor, creating proper organization and culture of societies; work, its quality, its amount, is a subtle creation of will, maintained by entire cultures, which in turn is a very subtle and complicated creation.

Brzozowski reaches the conclusion that an essential condition of the discipline of will is a strong, traditional moral bond. This results in recognizing religion as a valuable school of will and a precious element of intense social bond. The essence of work is therefore the inner life of a human being, spirituality, “willingness to work”, although it is strongly rooted in customs, in culture. This emphasis on roots indicates that community is of crucial importance for the continuity of work.

== Contemporary significance in Poland ==
Stanisław Brzozowski has an established position as one of the most important intellectuals in modern Polish history. His cultural and philosophical activity has been regularly debated throughout the last century in Poland. He became the point of reference for subsequent generations of Polish intellectuals. Although identified mainly with the political left, the subtlety and open-endedness of his thought allowed some groups from the right to identify themselves with Brzozowski's ideas as well.

Since 2002, Brzozowski has been the patron of Krytyka Polityczna (Political Critique), a Polish left-wing intellectual society organized around a journal of the same title founded by Sławomir Sierakowski in 2002. In 2005, the Stanisław Brzozowski Association was established and became the publisher of the journal and the on-line publication Dziennik Opinii (Opinion Daily). The association's core idea resembles that of its patron: that intellectuals are public figures who ought to live a socially involved and committed life.

== Main works ==
- Pod ciężarem Boga ("Under the Burden of God") [first published in 1901, novel]
- Filozofia czynu ("The Philosophy of Act") [1903]
- Wiry ("The Whirpools") [1904, novel]
- Kultura i życie. Zagadnienia sztuki i twórczości w walce o światopogląd ("Culture and Life") [1907]
- Płomienie ("Flames") [1908, novel]
- Legenda Młodej Polski. Studia o strukturze duszy kulturalnej ("The Legend of Young Poland. Studies on the Structure of the Cultural Spirit") [1910]
- Idee. Wstęp do filozofii dojrzałości dziejowej ("Ideas. An Introduction to the Philosophy of Historical Maturity") [1910]
- Sam wśród ludzi ("Alone Among People") [1911, novel]
- Głosy wśród nocy. Studia nad przesileniem romantycznym kultury europejskiej ("Voices in the Night. Studies on the Romantic Turning Point in European Culture") [1912]
- Pamiętnik Stanisława Brzozowskiego ("The Diary") [1913]
- Widma moich współczesnych ("The Ghosts of My Contemporaries") [1914]
- Książka o starej kobiecie ("A Book About an Old Woman") [1914, novel]
