= Leszczany, Lublin Voivodeship =

Leszczany
- Village
- Location within Poland
- Coordinates: 51°1′N 23°36′E
- Country: Poland
- Voivodeship: Lublin
- County: Chełm
- Gmina: Żmudź

Leszczany [lɛʂˈt͡ʂanɨ] is a village in the administrative district of Gmina Żmudź, within Chełm County, Lublin Voivodeship, in eastern Poland.
