= Annopol, Chełm County =

Annopol
- Village
- Location within Poland
- Coordinates: 51°0′24″N 23°46′14″E
- Country: Poland
- Voivodeship: Lublin
- County: Chełm
- Gmina: Żmudź

Annopol [anˈnɔpɔl] is a village in the administrative district of Gmina Żmudź, within Chełm County, Lublin Voivodeship, in eastern Poland.
