= Pacówka =

- Village
- Location within Poland
- Coordinates: 51°2′17″N 23°39′28″E
- Country: Poland
- Voivodeship: Lublin
- County: Chełm
- Gmina: Żmudź

Pacówka [paˈt͡sufka] is a village in the administrative district of Gmina Żmudź, within Chełm County, Lublin Voivodeship, in eastern Poland.
