= Leszczany-Kolonia =

- Village
- Location within Poland
- Coordinates: 51°01′04″N 23°35′49″E
- Country: Poland
- Voivodeship: Lublin
- County: Chełm
- Gmina: Żmudź

Leszczany-Kolonia [lɛʂˈt͡ʂanɨ kɔˈlɔɲa] is a village in the administrative district of Gmina Żmudź, within Chełm County, Lublin Voivodeship, in eastern Poland.
