= Gałęzów-Kolonia Pierwsza =

- Village
- Location within Poland
- Coordinates: 51°02′27″N 22°37′10″E
- Country: Poland
- Voivodeship: Lublin
- County: Lublin
- Gmina: Bychawa

Gałęzów-Kolonia Pierwsza [ɡaˈwɛ̃zuf kɔˈlɔɲa ˈpjɛrfʂa] is a village in the administrative district of Gmina Bychawa, within Lublin County, Lublin Voivodeship, in eastern Poland.
