= Wola Gałęzowska =

- Village
- Location within Poland
- Coordinates: 50°59′N 22°33′E
- Country: Poland
- Voivodeship: Lublin
- County: Lublin
- Gmina: Bychawa
- Website: www.wolagalezowska.neostrada.pl

Wola Gałęzowska (Polish pronunciation: [ˈvɔla ɡawɛ̃ˈzɔfska]) is a village in the administrative district of Gmina Bychawa, within Lublin County, Lublin Voivodeship, in eastern Poland.
