= Teresin, Gmina Żmudź =

Teresin
- Village
- Location within Poland
- Coordinates: 51°01′25″N 23°44′45″E
- Country: Poland
- Voivodeship: Lublin
- County: Chełm
- Gmina: Żmudź

Teresin (Polish pronunciation: [tɛˈrɛɕin]) is a village in the administrative district of Gmina Żmudź, within Chełm County, Lublin Voivodeship, in eastern Poland.
