= Stara Wieś, Chełm County =

Stara Wieś
- Village
- Location within Poland
- Coordinates: 51°01′52″N 23°37′43″E
- Country: Poland
- Voivodeship: Lublin
- County: Chełm
- Gmina: Żmudź

Stara Wieś [ˈstara ˈvjɛɕ] is a village in the administrative district of Gmina Żmudź, within Chełm County, Lublin Voivodeship, in eastern Poland.
