= Ksawerów, Lublin Voivodeship =

Ksawerów
- Village
- Location within Poland
- Coordinates: 51°04′20″N 23°43′17″E
- Country: Poland
- Voivodeship: Lublin
- County: Chełm
- Gmina: Żmudź
- Time zone: UTC+1 (CET)
  - Summer (DST): UTC+2 (CEST)

Ksawerów [ksaˈvɛruf] is a village in the administrative district of Gmina Żmudź, within Chełm County, Lublin Voivodeship, in eastern Poland.

== History ==
In the late 19th century, during an ethnographic expedition led by Pavlo Chubynsky in 1869–1870, it was documented that the inhabitants of Ksawerów were predominantly Greek Catholics who spoke Ukrainian.

Six Polish citizens were murdered by Nazi Germany in the village during World War II.

== Demographic trends ==
Over the years, Ksawerów has experienced a decline in population. Data indicates a decrease from 16 residents in 1975 to 10 in 2015, marking a 37.5% reduction over four decades.

== Geographical context ==
Nearby cities include Chełm, located approximately 25 kilometers to the northwest, and Lublin, the voivodeship's capital, situated further west.
