= Maziarnia, Chełm County =

Maziarnia
- Village
- Location within Poland
- Coordinates: 50°58′50″N 23°39′15″E
- Country: Poland
- Voivodeship: Lublin
- County: Chełm
- Gmina: Żmudź

Maziarnia [maˈʑarɲa] is a village in the administrative district of Gmina Żmudź, within Chełm County, Lublin Voivodeship, in eastern Poland.

It is the birthplace of Polish philosopher Stanisław Brzozowski (1878–1911).
