= Olszowiec, Lublin County =

Olszowiec
- Village
- Location within Poland
- Coordinates: 51°00′50″N 22°35′38″E
- Country: Poland
- Voivodeship: Lublin
- County: Lublin
- Gmina: Bychawa

Olszowiec [ɔlˈʂɔvjɛt͡s] is a village in the administrative district of Gmina Bychawa, within Lublin County, Lublin Voivodeship, in eastern Poland.
