= Klesztów =

- Village
- Location within Poland
- Coordinates: 51°2′N 23°42′E
- Country: Poland
- Voivodeship: Lublin
- County: Chełm
- Gmina: Żmudź

Population
  - Total: 87

Klesztów [ˈklɛʂtuf] is a village in the administrative district of Gmina Żmudź, within Chełm County, Lublin Voivodeship, in eastern Poland.

In Klesztów, there is a former Uniate, now Roman Catholic, church of the Assumption of Mary with illusionistic monumental paintings (1772) signed by painter Gabriel Sławiński. He also could be the author of two icons in the side altars (Saint Luke Evangelist, The Communion of Saint Onuphrius).

== Bibliography ==
- Magdalena Ludera, Gabriel Sławiński – późnobarokowy malarz w służbie Kościoła i Cerkwi (= Prace Muzeum Narodowego w Krakowie, vol. 6), Kraków 2016
- Magdalena Ludera, The copy of the Chełm icon of Mother of God in the Orthodox church in Klesztów. Dating, direct inspiration, cult, „Roczniki Teologiczne KUL”, 2016, no. 4: Historia Kościoła, 63, 2016, pp. 109–127
