= Zaraszów-Kolonia =

- Village
- Location within Poland
- Coordinates: 50°58′03″N 22°35′09″E
- Country: Poland
- Voivodeship: Lublin
- County: Lublin
- Gmina: Bychawa

Zaraszów-Kolonia [zaˈraʂuf kɔˈlɔɲa] is a village in the administrative district of Gmina Bychawa, within Lublin County, Lublin Voivodeship, in eastern Poland.
