= Kolonia, Chełm County =

Kolonia
- Village
- Location within Poland
- Coordinates: 51°03′05″N 23°42′19″E
- Country: Poland
- Voivodeship: Lublin
- County: Chełm
- Gmina: Żmudź

Kolonia [kɔˈlɔɲa] is a village in the administrative district of Gmina Żmudź, within Chełm County, Lublin Voivodeship, in eastern Poland.
