= Poręb =

- Village
- Location within Poland
- Coordinates: 51°04′42″N 23°46′12″E
- Country: Poland
- Voivodeship: Lublin
- County: Chełm
- Gmina: Żmudź

Poręb [ˈpɔrɛmp] is a village in Gmina Żmudź, Chełm County, Lublin Voivodeship, Poland. It is around 15 km (9 mi) south-east of Siedlce and around 100 km (62 mi) east of Warsaw.
