= Podlaski, Lublin Voivodeship =

Podlaski
- Village
- Location within Poland
- Coordinates: 51°03′38″N 23°38′56″E
- Country: Poland
- Voivodeship: Lublin
- County: Chełm
- Gmina: Żmudź

Podlaski [pɔdˈlaski] is a village in the administrative district of Gmina Żmudź, within Chełm County, Lublin Voivodeship, in eastern Poland.
