= Pobołowice-Kolonia =

- Village
- Location within Poland
- Coordinates: 51°3′20″N 23°39′17″E
- Country: Poland
- Voivodeship: Lublin
- County: Chełm
- Gmina: Żmudź

Pobołowice-Kolonia [pɔbɔwɔˈvit͡sɛ kɔˈlɔɲa] is a village in the administrative district of Gmina Żmudź, within Chełm County, Lublin Voivodeship, in eastern Poland.
