= Stanisławów, Chełm County =

Stanisławów
- Village
- Location within Poland
- Coordinates: 51°1′N 23°44′E
- Country: Poland
- Voivodeship: Lublin
- County: Chełm
- Gmina: Żmudź

Stanisławów [staniˈswavuf] is a village in the administrative district of Gmina Żmudź, within Chełm County, Lublin Voivodeship, in eastern Poland.
