= Wandzin, Lublin County =

Wandzin
- Village
- Location within Poland
- Coordinates: 51°00′59″N 22°32′45″E
- Country: Poland
- Voivodeship: Lublin
- County: Lublin
- Gmina: Bychawa

Wandzin [ˈvand͡ʑin] is a village in the administrative district of Gmina Bychawa, within Lublin County, Lublin Voivodeship, in eastern Poland.
