= Olszowiec-Kolonia =

- Village
- Location within Poland
- Coordinates: 51°01′14″N 22°36′22″E
- Country: Poland
- Voivodeship: Lublin
- County: Lublin
- Gmina: Bychawa

Olszowiec-Kolonia [ɔlˈʂɔvjɛt͡s kɔˈlɔɲa] is a village in the administrative district of Gmina Bychawa, within Lublin County, Lublin Voivodeship, in eastern Poland.
