= Łęczyca, Lublin Voivodeship =

Łęczyca
- Village
- Location within Poland
- Coordinates: 51°00′49″N 22°29′53″E
- Country: Poland
- Voivodeship: Lublin
- County: Lublin
- Gmina: Bychawa

Łęczyca (pronounced [wɛnˈt͡ʂɨt͡sa]) is a village in the administrative district of Gmina Bychawa, within Lublin County, Lublin Voivodeship, in eastern Poland.
