= Wincentówek, Lublin Voivodeship =

Wincentówek
- Village
- Location within Poland
- Coordinates: 51°02′21″N 22°31′52″E
- Country: Poland
- Voivodeship: Lublin
- County: Lublin
- Gmina: Bychawa

Wincentówek [vint͡sɛnˈtuvɛk] is a village in the administrative district of Gmina Bychawa, within Lublin County, Lublin Voivodeship, in eastern Poland.
