= Wola Duża-Kolonia =

- Village
- Location within Poland
- Coordinates: 51°01′28″N 22°34′15″E
- Country: Poland
- Voivodeship: Lublin
- County: Lublin
- Gmina: Bychawa

Wola Duża-Kolonia [ˈvɔla ˈduʐa kɔˈlɔɲa] is a village in the administrative district of Gmina Bychawa, within Lublin County, Lublin Voivodeship, in eastern Poland.
