= Dębinki, Lublin Voivodeship =

Dębinki
- Village
- Location within Poland
- Coordinates: 51°01′54″N 23°43′15″E
- Country: Poland
- Voivodeship: Lublin
- County: Chełm
- Gmina: Żmudź

Dębinki [dɛmˈbinki] is a village in the administrative district of Gmina Żmudź, within Chełm County, Lublin Voivodeship, in eastern Poland.
