= Zaraszów =

- Village
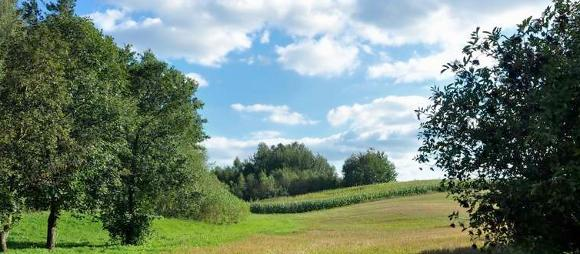

- Location within Poland
- Coordinates: 50°59′N 22°35′E
- Country: Poland
- Voivodeship: Lublin
- County: Lublin
- Gmina: Bychawa

Zaraszów [zaˈraʂuf] is a village in the administrative district of Gmina Bychawa, within Lublin County, Lublin Voivodeship, in eastern Poland.
