= Roztoka, Lublin Voivodeship =

Roztoka
- Village
- Location within Poland
- Coordinates: 51°2′33″N 23°44′29″E
- Country: Poland
- Voivodeship: Lublin
- County: Chełm
- Gmina: Żmudź

Population
  - Total: 104

Roztoka [rɔsˈtɔka] is a village in the administrative district of Gmina Żmudź, within Chełm County, Lublin Voivodeship, in eastern Poland.
