= Osowa, Lublin County =

Osowa
- Village
- Location within Poland
- Coordinates: 51°3′N 22°35′E
- Country: Poland
- Voivodeship: Lublin
- County: Lublin
- Gmina: Bychawa

Osowa [ɔˈsɔva] is a village in the administrative district of Gmina Bychawa, within Lublin County, Lublin Voivodeship, in eastern Poland.
