= Leśniczówka, Lublin County =

Leśniczówka
- Village
- Location within Poland
- Coordinates: 51°00′13″N 22°30′33″E
- Country: Poland
- Voivodeship: Lublin
- County: Lublin
- Gmina: Bychawa

Leśniczówka (Polish pronunciation: [lɛɕɲiˈtʂufka]) is a village in the administrative district of Gmina Bychawa, within Lublin County, Lublin Voivodeship, in eastern Poland.
