= Gmina Bychawa =

Gmina Bychawa Bychawa Commune
- Gmina
- Flag Coat of arms
- Interactive map of Gmina Bychawa
- Coordinates (Bychawa): 51°1′N 22°32′E
- Country: Poland
- Voivodeship: Lublin
- County: Lublin County
- Seat: Bychawa

Area
  - Total: 146.19 km^{2} (56.44 sq mi)

Population (2019)
  - Total: 11,647
  - Density: 79.670/km^{2} (206.35/sq mi)
  - Urban: 4,893
  - Rural: 6,754
- Website: http://www.bychawa.pl/

Gmina Bychawa is an urban-rural gmina (administrative district) in Lublin County, Lublin Voivodeship, in eastern Poland. Its seat is the town of Bychawa, which lies approximately 26 kilometres (16 mi) south of the regional capital Lublin.

The gmina covers an area of 146.19 square kilometres (56.4 sq mi), and as of 2019 its total population is 11,647, of which the population of Bychawa is 4,893, and the population of the rural part of the gmina is 6,754.

== Villages ==
Apart from the town of Bychawa, Gmina Bychawa contains the villages and settlements of Bychawka Druga, Bychawka Druga-Kolonia, Bychawka Pierwsza, Bychawka Trzecia, Bychawka Trzecia-Kolonia, Gałęzów, Gałęzów-Kolonia Druga, Gałęzów-Kolonia Pierwsza, Grodzany, Józwów, Kosarzew Dolny-Kolonia, Kowersk, Łęczyca, Leśniczówka, Marysin, Olszowiec, Olszowiec-Kolonia, Osowa, Osowa-Kolonia, Podzamcze, Romanów, Skawinek, Stara Wieś Druga, Stara Wieś Pierwsza, Stara Wieś Trzecia, Urszulin, Wandzin, Wincentówek, Wola Duża, Wola Duża-Kolonia, Wola Gałęzowska, Wola Gałęzowska-Kolonia, Zadębie, Zaraszów, Zaraszów-Kolonia and Zdrapy.

== Neighbouring gminas ==
Gmina Bychawa is bordered by the gminas of Jabłonna, Krzczonów, Strzyżewice, Wysokie, Zakrzew and Zakrzówek.
