= Bychawa =

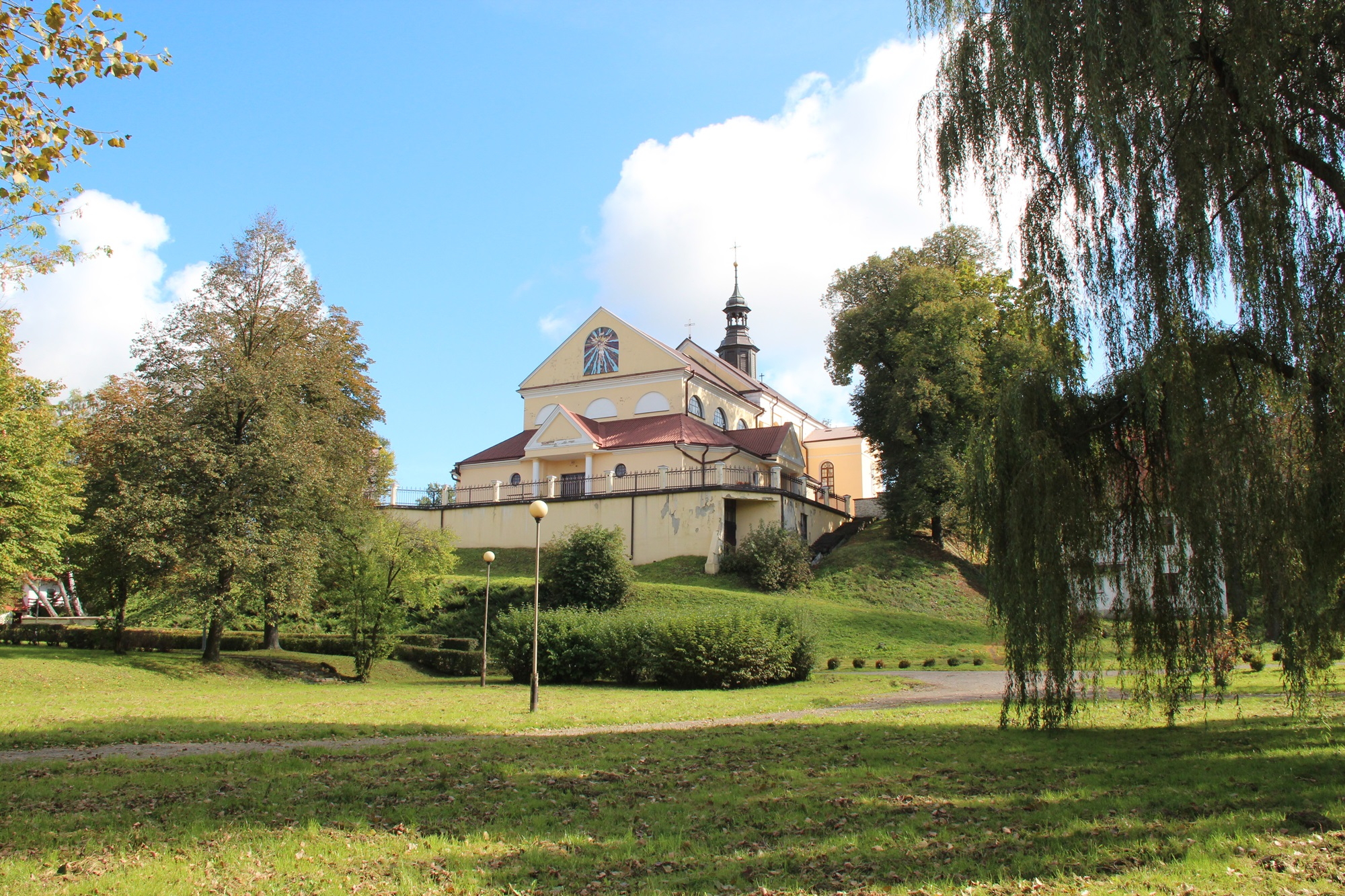
- Late Renaissance Saint John the Baptist church seen from the park

- Flag Coat of arms

- Location within Poland
- Coordinates: 51°1′N 22°32′E
- Country: Poland
- Voivodeship: Lublin
- County: Lublin
- Gmina: Bychawa
- Town rights: 1537

Government
  - Mayor: Marta Krzyżak (PiS)

Area
  - Total: 6.69 km^{2} (2.58 sq mi)

Population (31 December 2021)
  - Total: 4,757
  - Density: 711/km^{2} (1,840/sq mi)
- Time zone: UTC+1 (CET)
  - Summer (DST): UTC+2 (CEST)
- Postal code: 23-100
- Area code: +48 81
- Climate: Dfb
- Car plates: LUB
- Website: https://www.bychawa.pl/

Bychawa [bɨˈxava] (Yiddish: בעכעװע, romanized: Bekheve) is a town in southeastern Poland, in Lublin Voivodeship, in Lublin County, about 25 km (16 mi) south of Lublin. The town lies in Lublin Upland and belongs to historic Lesser Poland. It is situated on the Gałęzówka and Kosarzewka rivers. The town has an area of 6.69 square kilometres (2.58 sq mi), and as of December 2021, it has 4,757 inhabitants.

== History ==
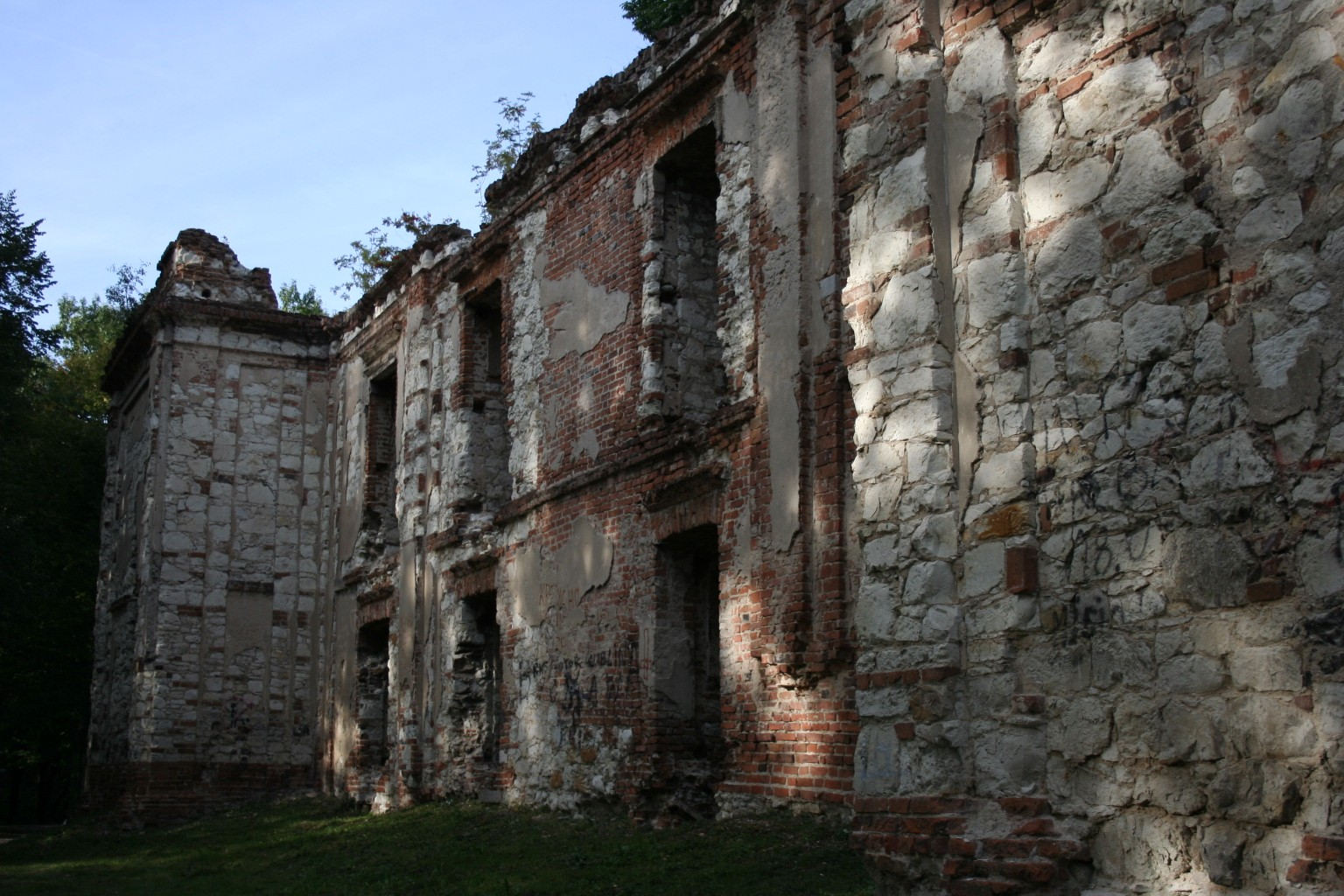
Palace ruins in Bychawa

The gord, located at the site of current Bychawa, existed as early as the 9th and 10th centuries. The town was first mentioned in historical documents from the 14th century. In 1537, King Sigismund I the Old granted Bychawa Magdeburg town rights and established two annual fairs. It was a private town in the Lublin Voivodeship in the Lesser Poland Province of the Kingdom of Poland. The town developed successfully, trade and crafts flourished, including weapons production, and a Renaissance church was built. In the second half of the 16th century, Bychawa was a Reformation center, and Calvinist synods were held there. In 1637, King Władysław IV Vasa confirmed and extended the town's privileges. War hampered the development in the mid-17th century. In 1649, Cossacks and later, the Swedes invaded and destroyed the town.

As a result of the Partitions of Poland in 1795, Bychawa was annexed by Austria. In 1809, Poles regained it and included it in the short-lived Polish Duchy of Warsaw; since 1815, it was part of the Russian-controlled Congress Poland. Following the January Uprising, the Russians stripped it of its town rights in 1863. Bychawa remained a village until 1958. During World War I, the Austrians occupied it from 1915 to 1918.

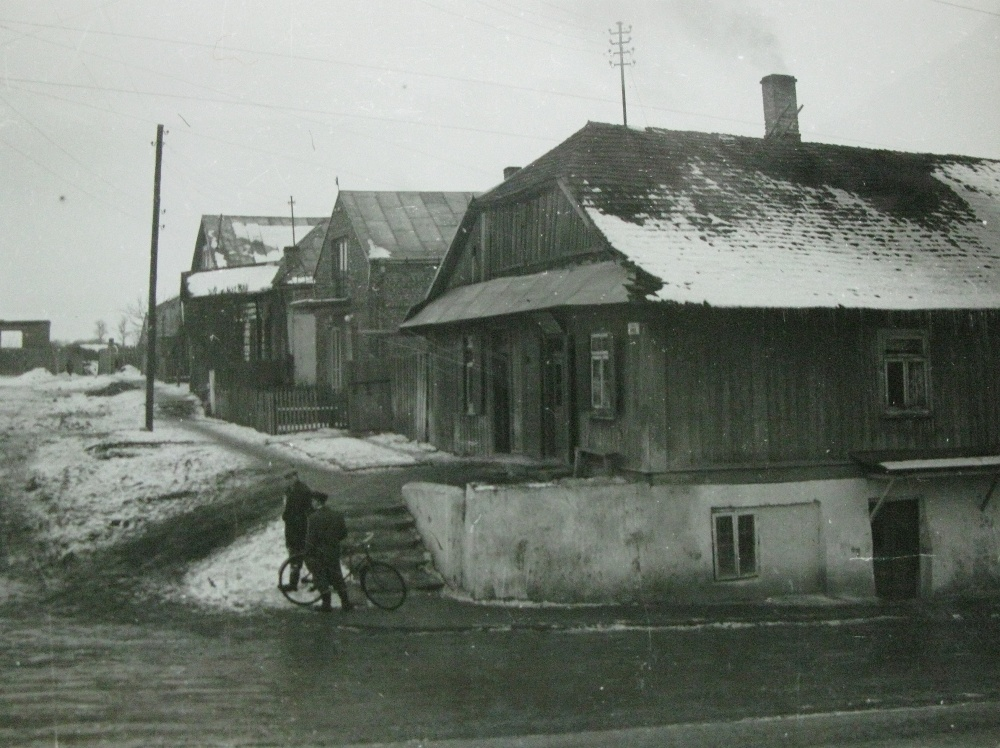
Street corner in the Jewish section

In 1900, Bychawa had 2,800 inhabitants, including 2,294 Jews, who constituted 81% of the total population of the town, as a result of Russian discriminatory regulations. According to the 1921 census, the town had a population of 2,848, 63.0% Jewish and 36.8% Polish. In the second half of the 1930s, due to the worsening economic situation and intensifying anti-Semitic atmosphere, the situation of Jews in Bychawa systematically declined, which led to an increase in the emigration rate. On the eve of the outbreak of World War II, Jewry made up only half of the entire population in Bychawa. The Germans created a ghetto in Bychawa in December 1940 during World War II, and around 2,600 Jews lived in the ghetto in 1942. Jews from Bychawa were transported to the ghetto in Bełżyce and then to the Sobibor extermination camp on 11 October 1942. Apart from regular mass exterminations in Bełżec, the Nazis also carried out individual executions around the town.

In July 1944, as part of Operation Tempest, the Polish Home Army liberated Bychawa from German occupation, and a few days later, the Soviets entered the town.

From 1956 to 1975, Bychawa was the seat of Bychawa County. In 1958, town rights were restored. In 1962, a Culture House was built. In 1966, a housing cooperative was founded.

== Sights ==
The town's landmark is the late Renaissance Saint John the Baptist church, built in the early 17th century. Other monuments include the old Catholic cemetery with Duniewski's mausoleum, the ruins of the palace, and a synagogue.

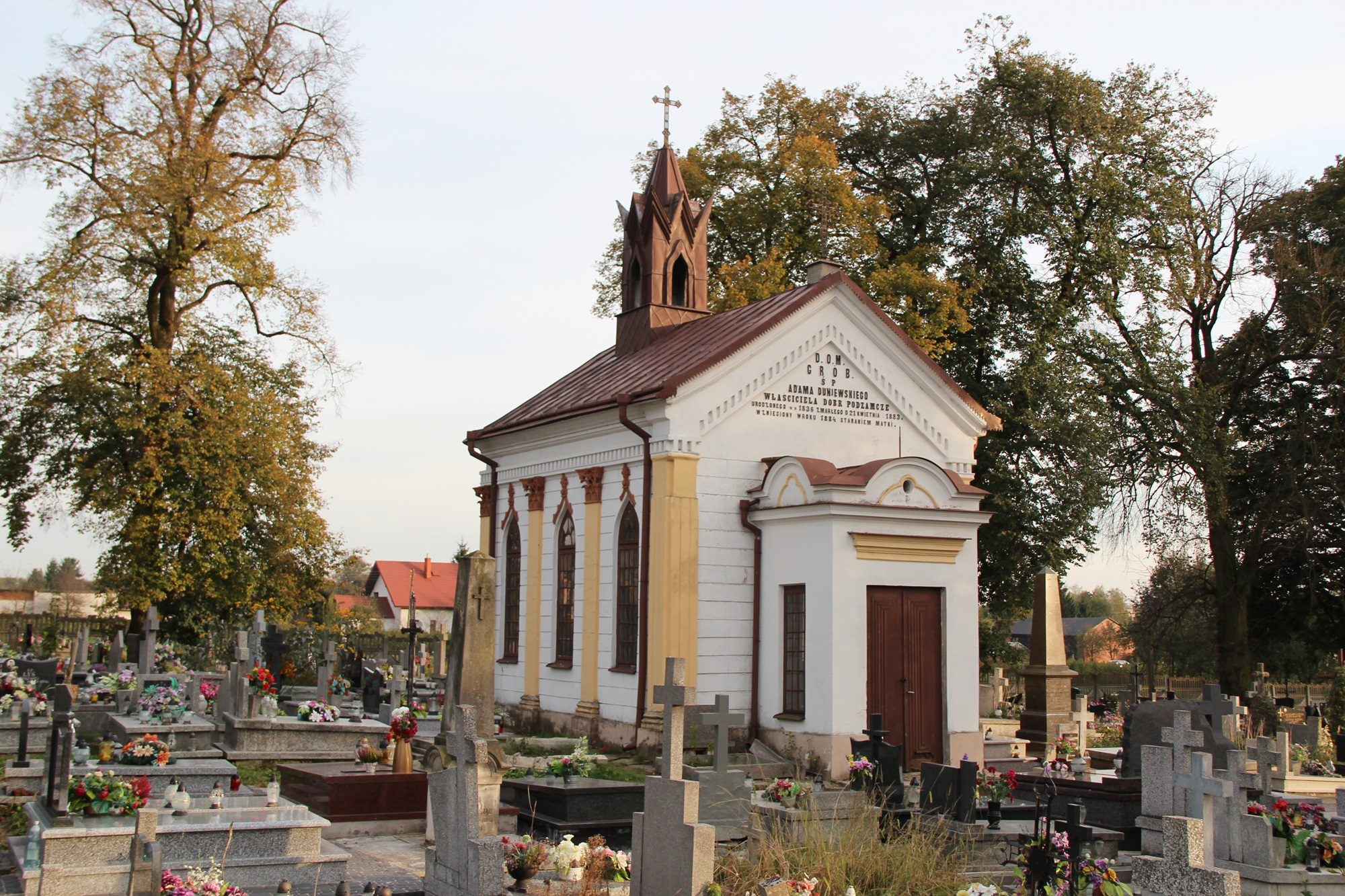
Catholic cemetery with Duniewski's mausoleum

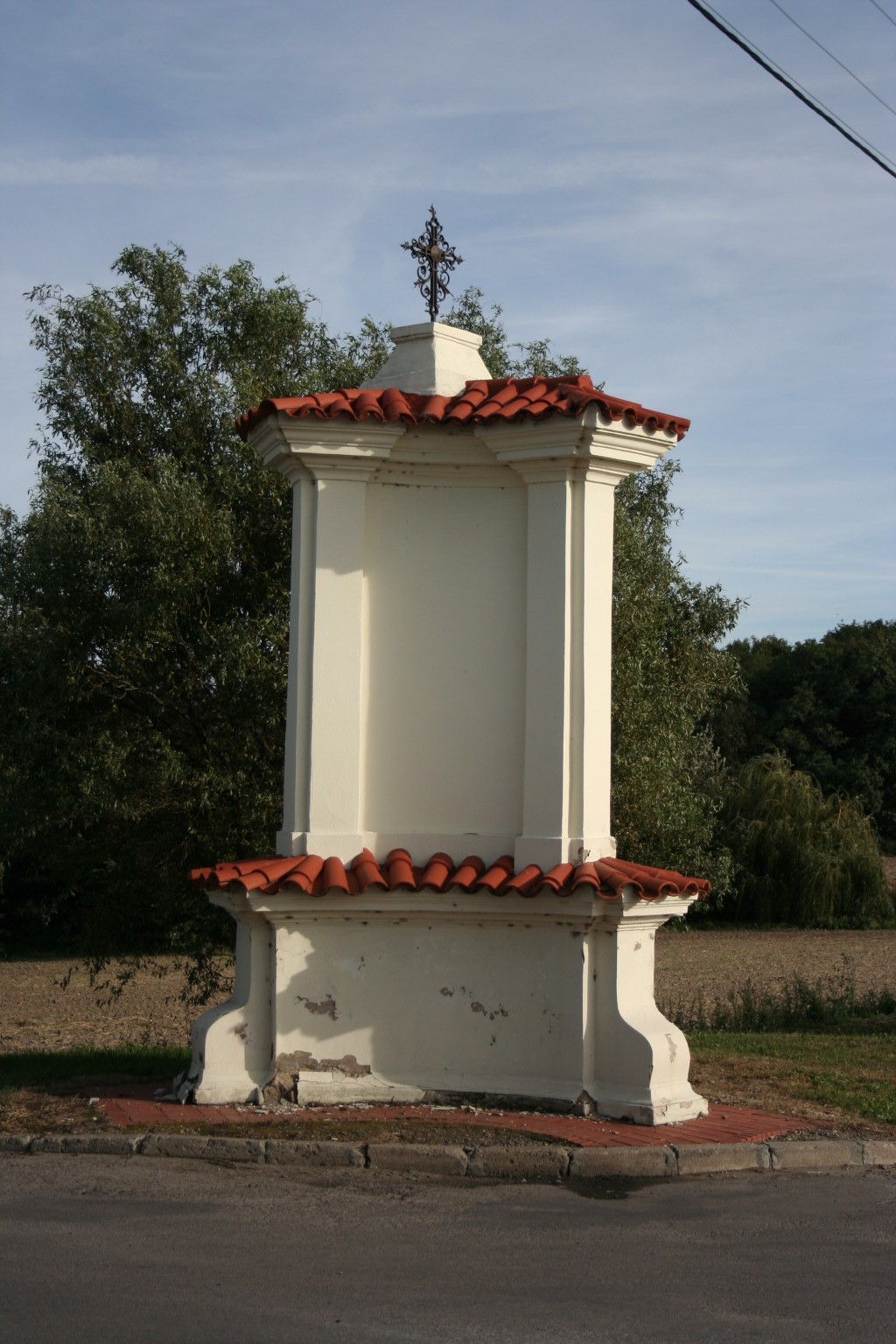
18th-century wayside shrine in Bychawa

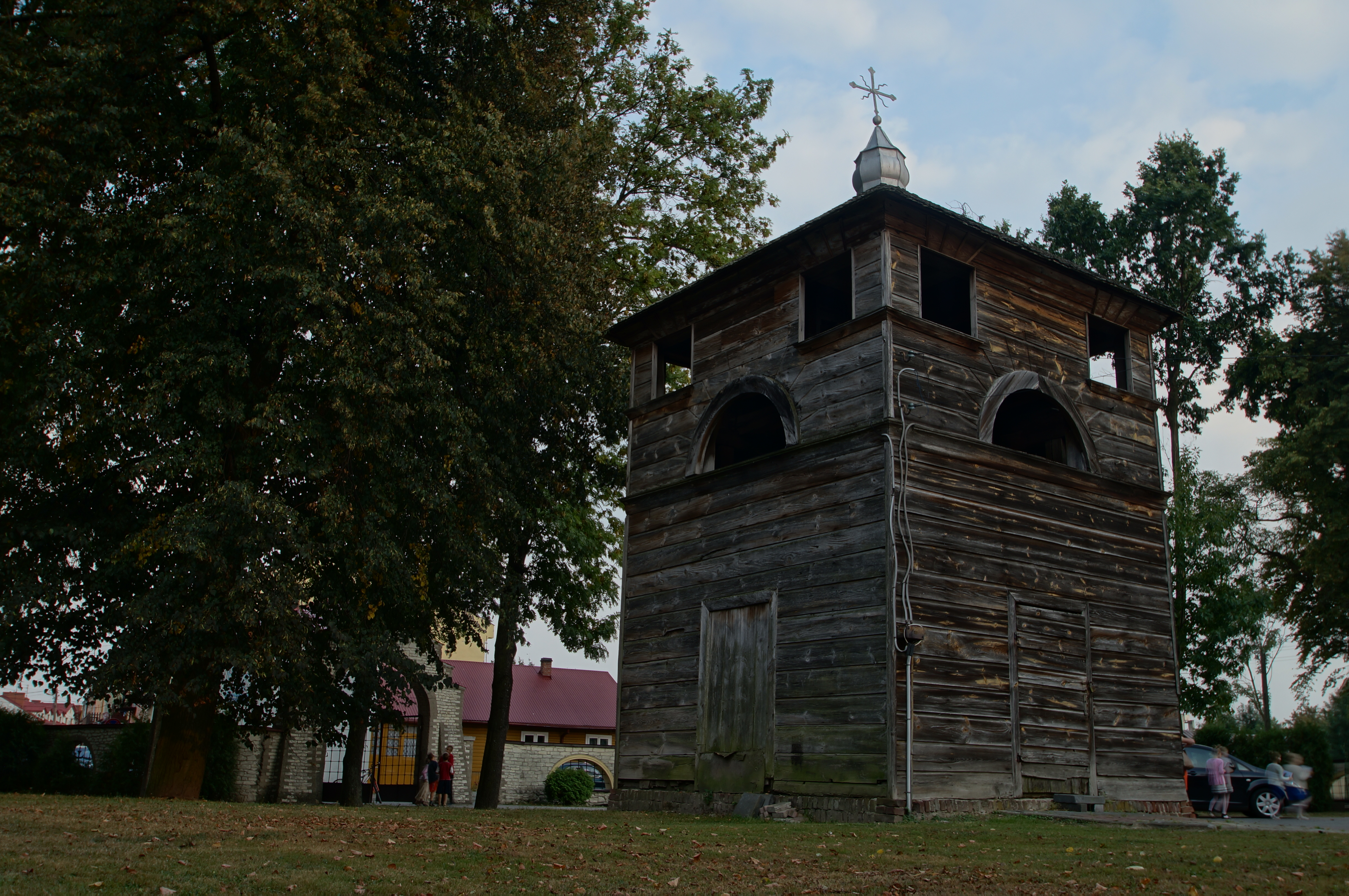
Wooden belfry

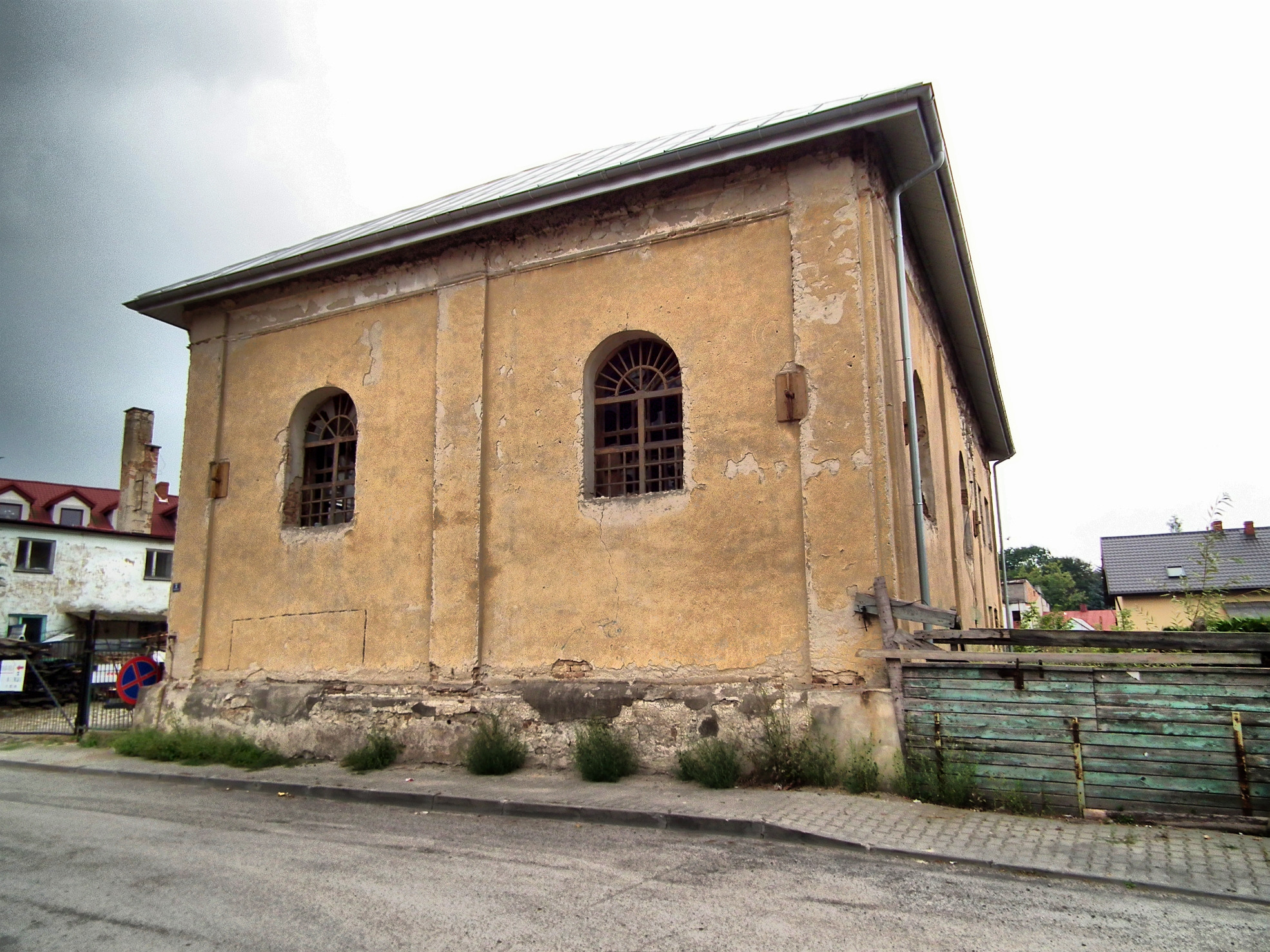
Former synagogue, 2013

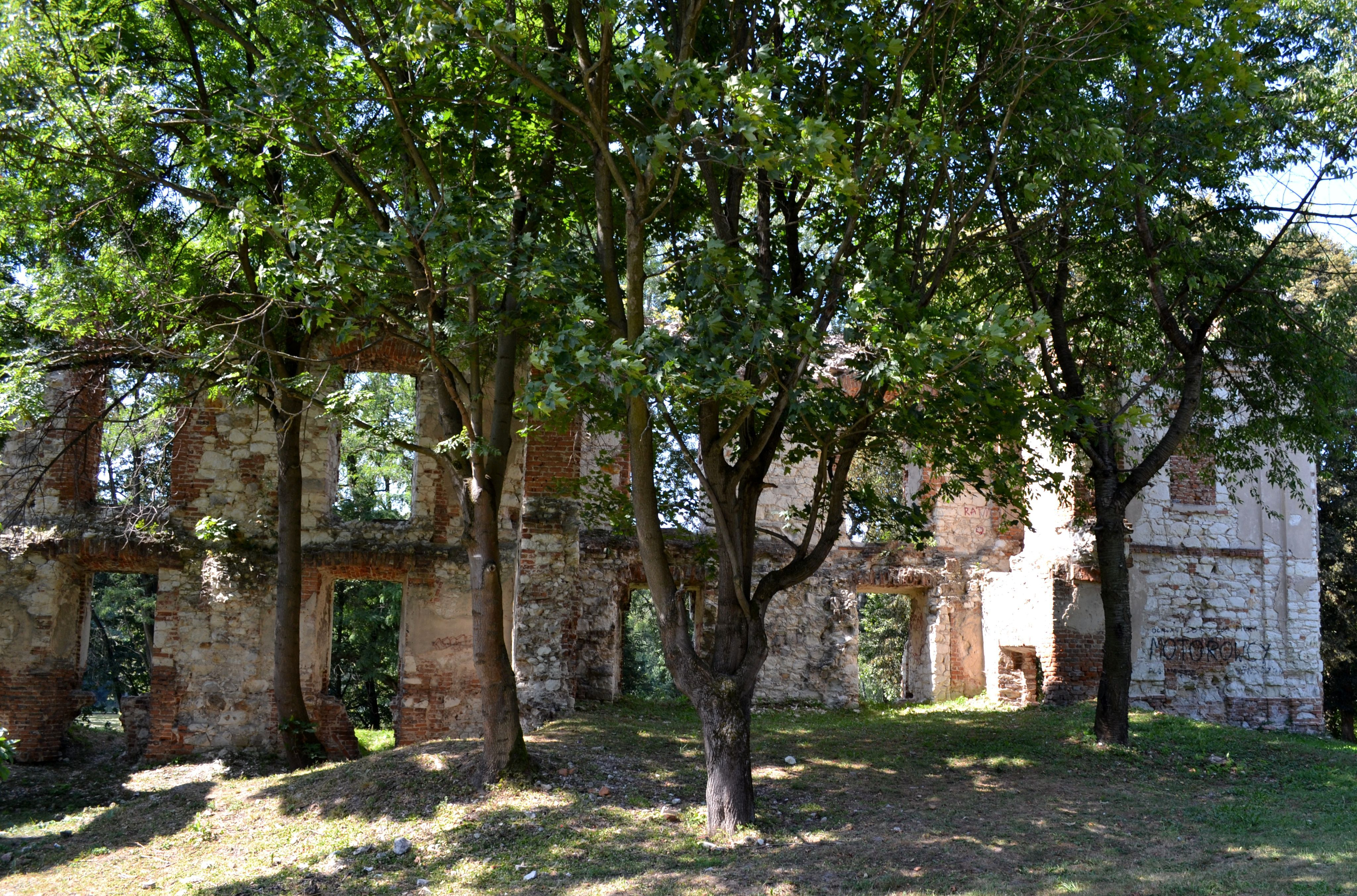
Palace ruins

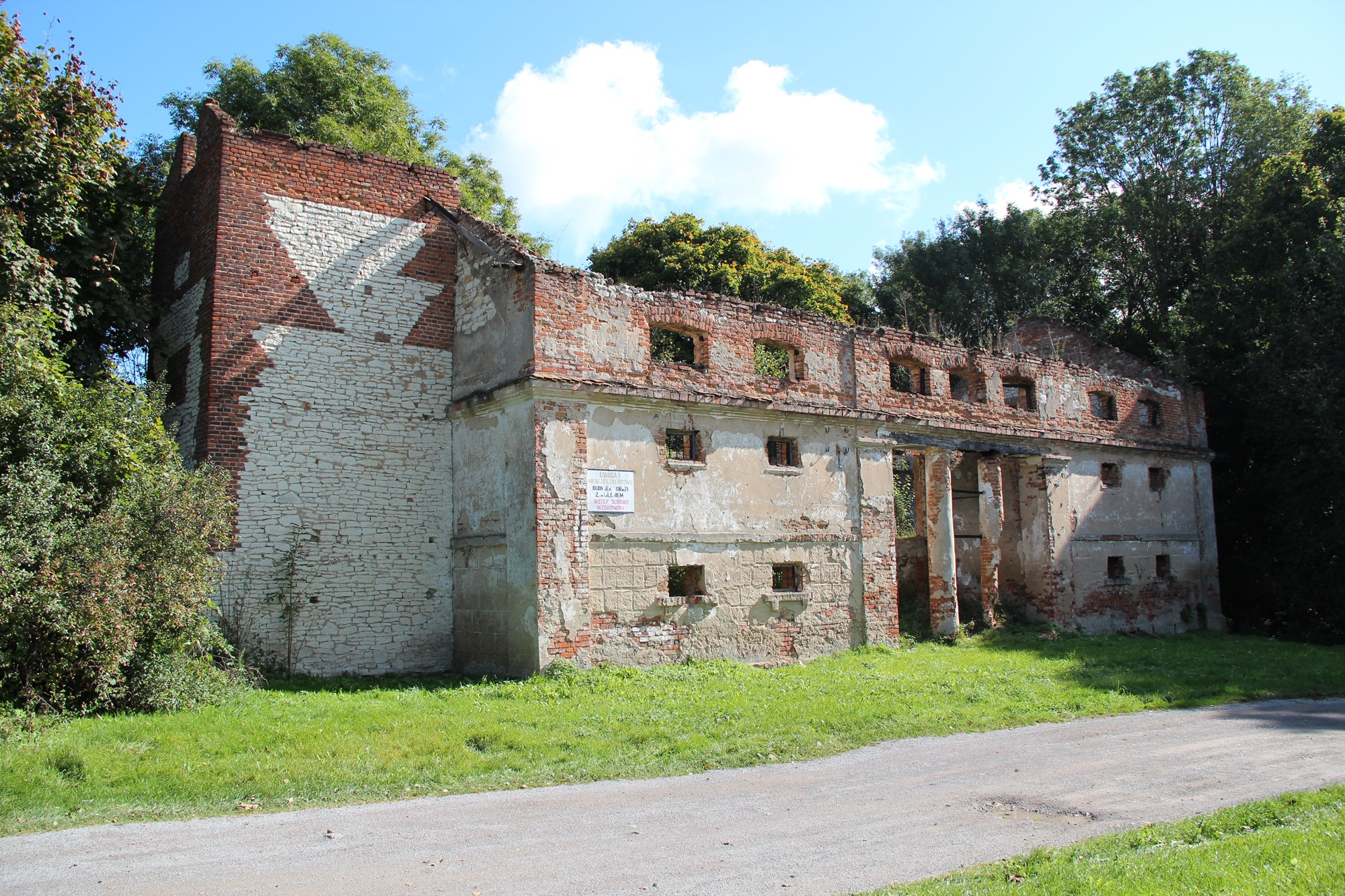
Old granary ruins
