= Podzamcze, Lublin County =

Podzamcze
- Village
- Location within Poland
- Coordinates: 51°2′N 22°32′E
- Country: Poland
- Voivodeship: Lublin
- County: Lublin
- Gmina: Bychawa

Podzamcze [pɔˈd͡zamt͡ʂɛ] is a village in the administrative district of Gmina Bychawa, within Lublin County, Lublin Voivodeship, in eastern Poland.

== See also ==
- Lublin Ghetto
