= Stara Wieś Trzecia =

- Village
- Location within Poland
- Coordinates: 50°56′28″N 22°31′47″E
- Country: Poland
- Voivodeship: Lublin
- County: Lublin
- Gmina: Bychawa

Population
  - Total: 308

Stara Wieś Trzecia [ˈstara ˈvjɛɕ ˈtʂɛt͡ɕa] is a village in the administrative district of Gmina Bychawa, within Lublin County, Lublin Voivodeship, in eastern Poland.
