= Zadębie, Lublin County =

Zadębie
- Village
- Location within Poland
- Coordinates: 51°01′07″N 22°32′44″E
- Country: Poland
- Voivodeship: Lublin
- County: Lublin
- Gmina: Bychawa

Zadębie [zaˈdɛmbjɛ] is a village in the administrative district of Gmina Bychawa, within Lublin County, Lublin Voivodeship, in eastern Poland.
