= Stara Wieś Druga, Lublin Voivodeship =

Stara Wieś Druga
- Village
- Location within Poland
- Coordinates: 50°56′42″N 22°32′22″E
- Country: Poland
- Voivodeship: Lublin
- County: Lublin
- Gmina: Bychawa

Population
  - Total: 239

Stara Wieś Druga [ˈstara ˈvjɛɕ ˈdruɡa] is a village in the administrative district of Gmina Bychawa, within Lublin County, Lublin Voivodeship, in eastern Poland.
