= Gałęzów, Lublin County =

Gałęzów
- Village
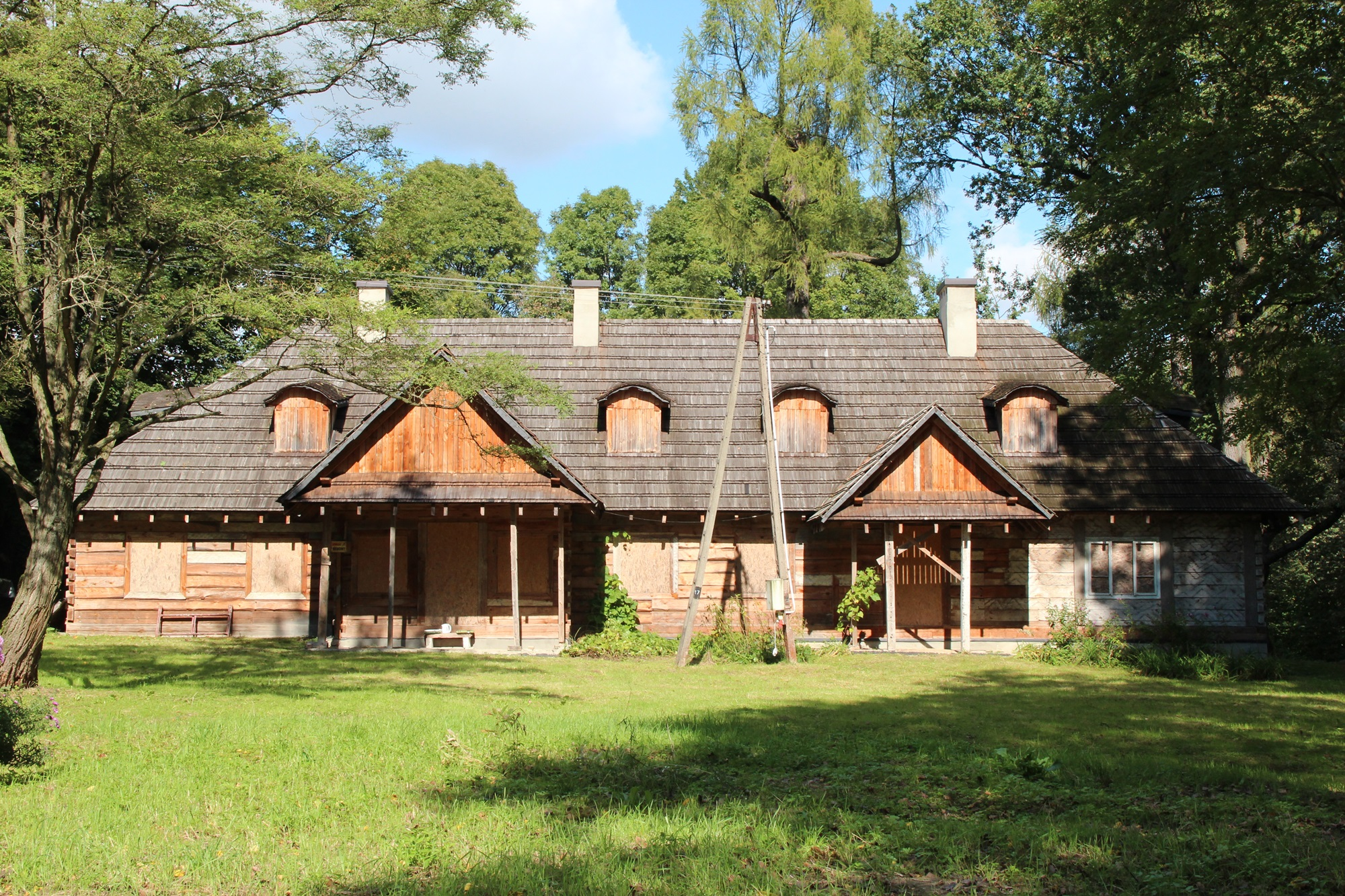
- Old manor house

- Location within Poland
- Coordinates: 50°59′N 22°32′E
- Country: Poland
- Voivodeship: Lublin
- County: Lublin
- Gmina: Bychawa
- Time zone: UTC+1 (CET)
  - Summer (DST): UTC+2 (CEST)

Gałęzów [ɡaˈwɛ̃zuf] is a village in the administrative district of Gmina Bychawa, within Lublin County, Lublin Voivodeship, in eastern Poland.

== History ==
Eleven Polish citizens were murdered by Nazi Germany in the village during World War II.
