= Poczekajka, Gmina Żmudź =

Poczekajka
- Village
- Location within Poland
- Coordinates: 51°01′36″N 23°36′18″E
- Country: Poland
- Voivodeship: Lublin
- County: Chełm
- Gmina: Żmudź

Poczekajka [pɔt͡ʂɛˈkai̯ka] is a village in the administrative district of Gmina Żmudź, within Chełm County, Lublin Voivodeship, in eastern Poland.
