= Kazimierówka, Chełm County =

Kazimierówka
- Village
- Location within Poland
- Coordinates: 51°4′9″N 23°46′23″E
- Country: Poland
- Voivodeship: Lublin
- County: Chełm
- Gmina: Żmudź

Kazimierówka [kaʑimjɛˈrufka] is a village in the administrative district of Gmina Żmudź, within Chełm County, Lublin Voivodeship, in eastern Poland.
