= Gmina Żmudź =

Gmina Żmudź Żmudź Commune
- Gmina
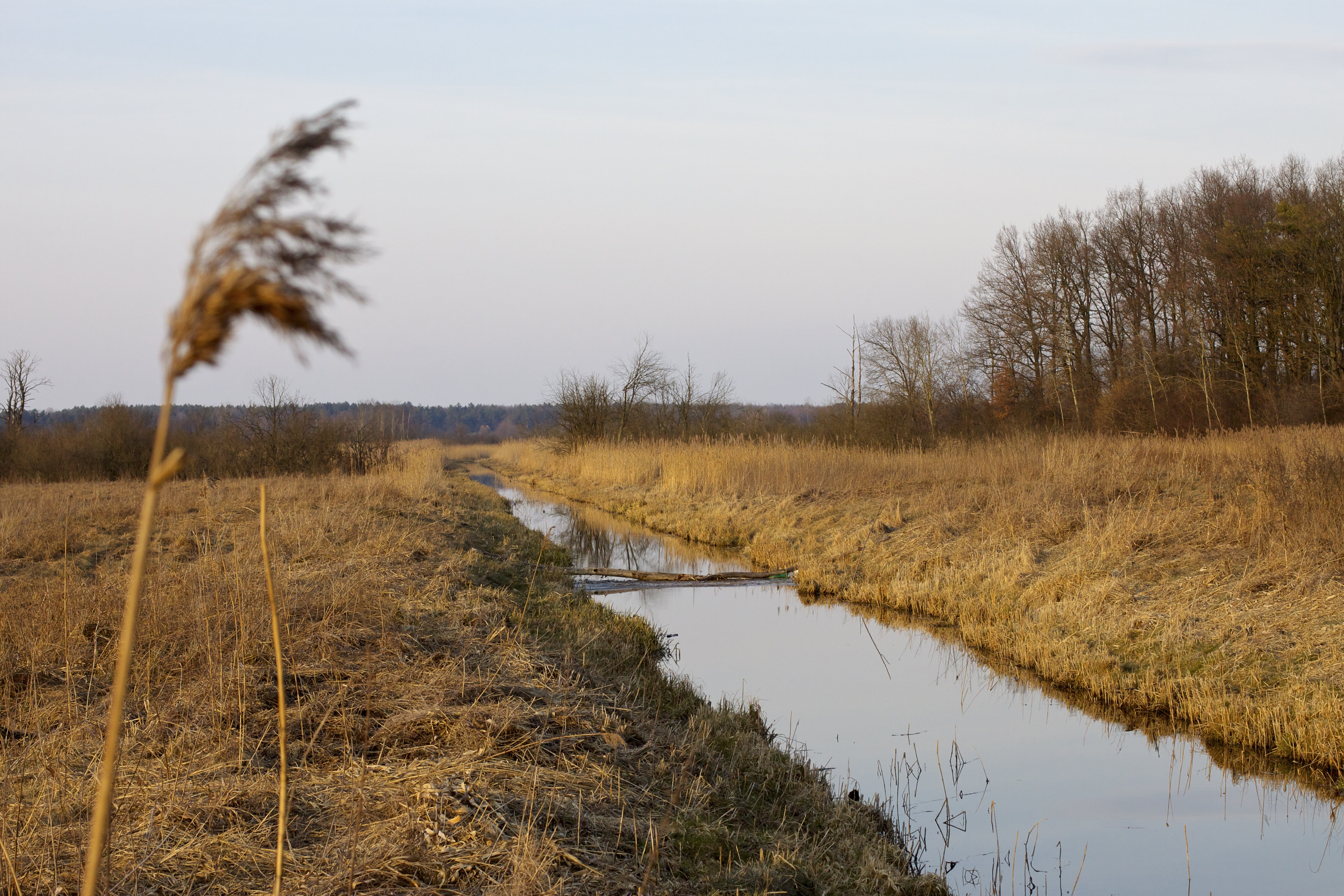

- Coat of arms

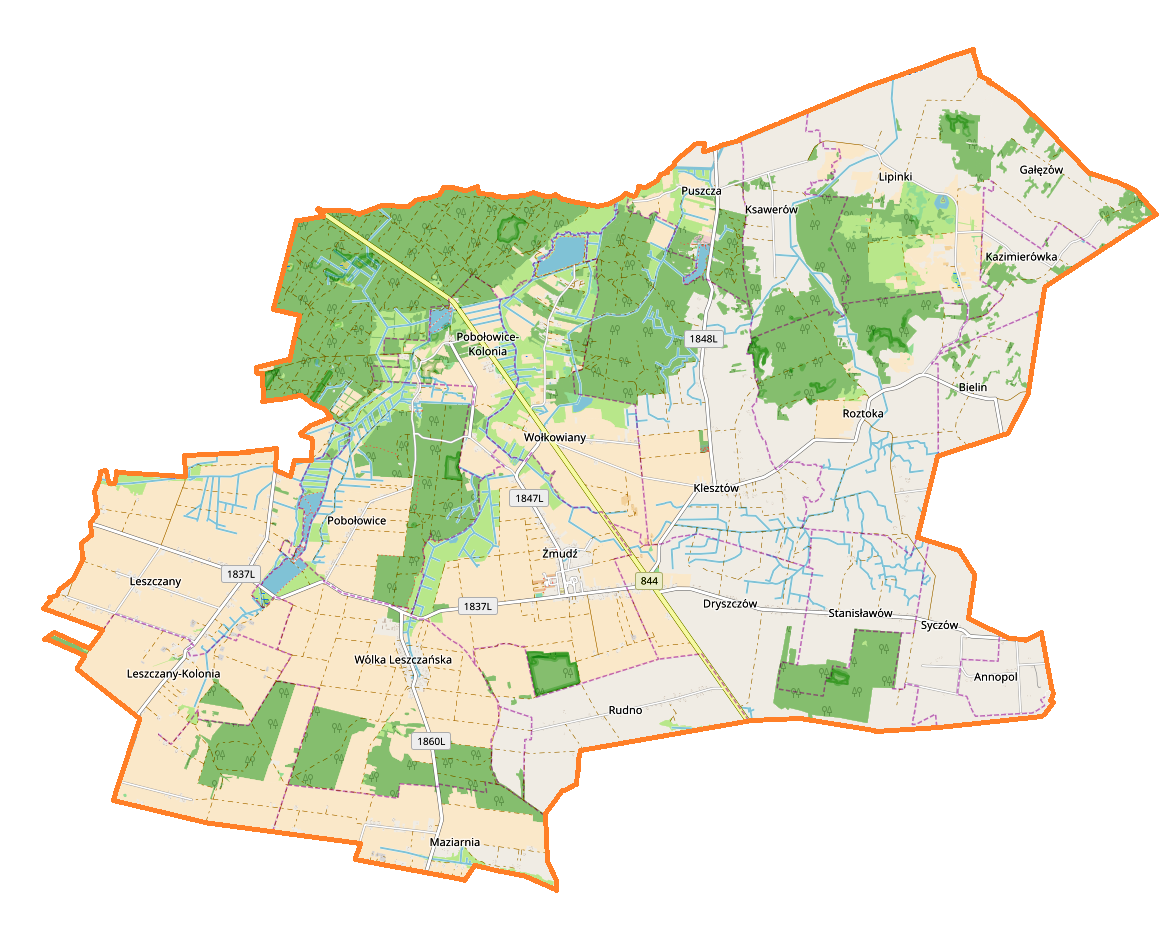
- Coordinates (Żmudź): 51°1′N 23°40′E
- Country: Poland
- Voivodeship: Lublin
- County: Chełm County
- Seat: Żmudź

Area
  - Total: 135.83 km^{2} (52.44 sq mi)

Population (2006)
  - Total: 3,397
  - Density: 25.01/km^{2} (64.77/sq mi)
- Website: http://www.zmudz.gmina.pl

Gmina Żmudź is a rural gmina (administrative district) in Chełm County, Lublin Voivodeship, in eastern Poland. Its seat is the village of Żmudź, which is approximately 20 kilometres (12 mi) south-east of Chełm and 81 km (50 mi) east of the regional capital Lublin.

The gmina covers an area of 135.83 square kilometres (52.4 sq mi), and as of 2006 its total population is 3,397.

== Villages ==
Gmina Żmudź contains the villages and settlements of:

- Annopol
- Bielin
- Dębinki
- Dryszczów
- Gałęzów
- Kazimierówka
- Klesztów
- Kolonia
- Ksawerów
- Leszczany
- Leszczany-Kolonia
- Lipinki
- Majdan
- Maziarnia
- Pacówka
- Pobołowice
- Pobołowice-Kolonia
- Poczekajka
- Podlaski
- Poręb
- Puszcza
- Roztoka
- Roztoka-Kolonia
- Rudno
- Stanisławów
- Stara Wieś
- Syczów
- Teresin
- Wólka Leszczańska
- Wołkowiany
- Żmudź
- Żmudź-Kolonia

== Neighbouring gminas ==
Gmina Żmudź is bordered by the gminas of Białopole, Dorohusk, Dubienka, Kamień, Leśniowice and Wojsławice.
