= Bielin, Lublin Voivodeship =

Village in eastern Poland

Bielin
- Village
- Location within Poland
- Coordinates: 51°3′N 23°46′E
- Country: Poland
- Voivodeship: Lublin
- County: Chełm
- Gmina: Żmudź

Bielin [ˈbjɛlin] is a village in the administrative district of Gmina Żmudź, within Chełm County, Lublin Voivodeship, in eastern Poland.
