= Żmudź, Lublin Voivodeship =

Żmudź
- Village
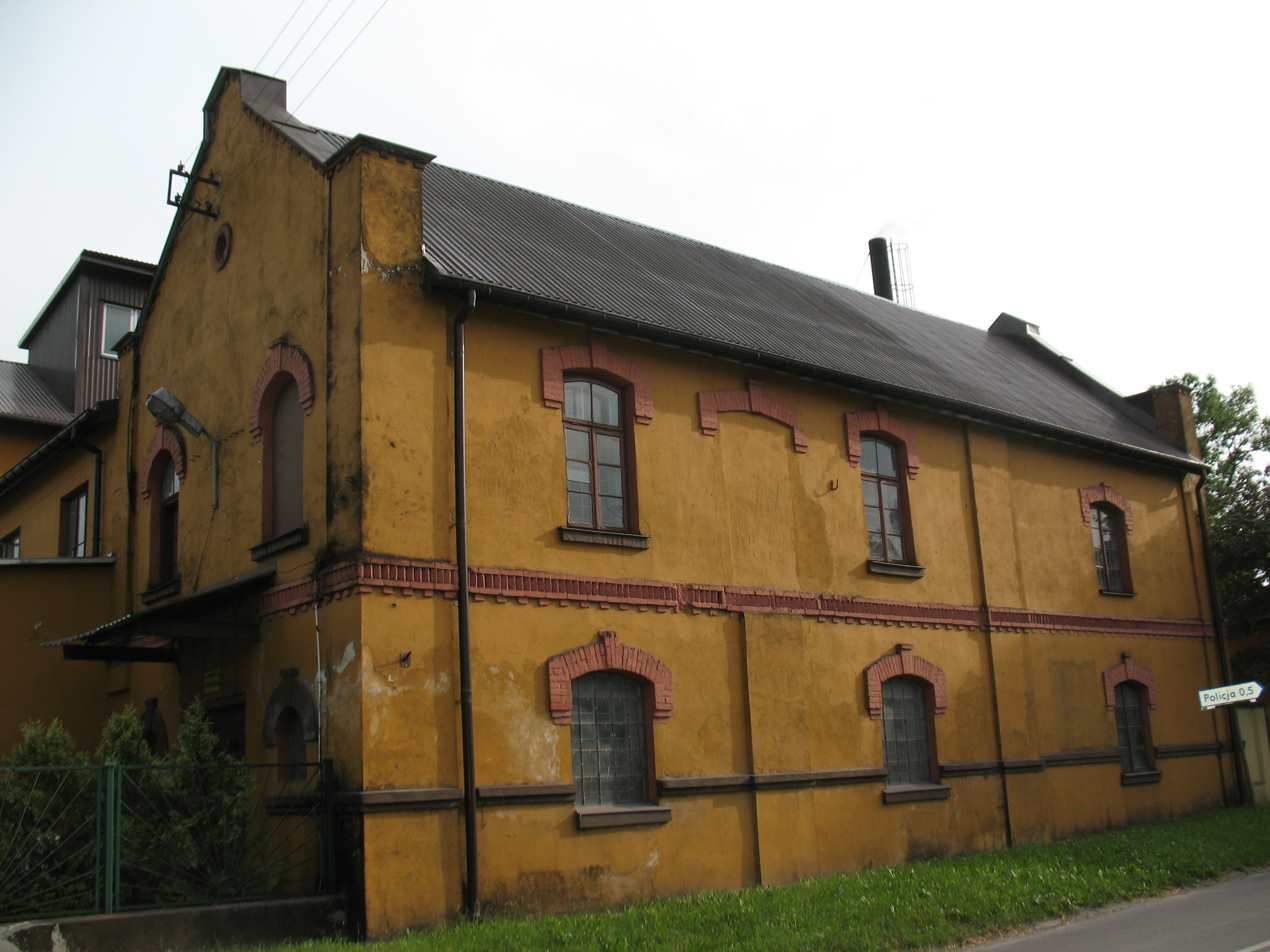

- Location within Poland
- Coordinates: 51°1′N 23°40′E
- Country: Poland
- Voivodeship: Lublin
- County: Chełm
- Gmina: Żmudź

Population
  - Total: 663
- Time zone: UTC+1 (CET)
  - Summer (DST): UTC+2 (CEST)
- Vehicle registration: LCH

Żmudź [ʐmut͡ɕ] is a village in Chełm County, Lublin Voivodeship, in eastern Poland. It is the seat of the gmina (administrative district) called Gmina Żmudź.

== History ==
Following the joint German-Soviet invasion of Poland, which started World War II in September 1939, the village was occupied by Germany until 1944. The occupiers established a forced labour camp for Jews and a subcamp of the Stalag 319 prisoner-of-war camp in 1940 and 1941, respectively.
