= Żmudź-Kolonia =

- Village
- Location within Poland
- Coordinates: 51°00′35″N 23°40′55″E
- Country: Poland
- Voivodeship: Lublin
- County: Chełm
- Gmina: Żmudź

Żmudź-Kolonia [ˈʐmut͡ɕ kɔˈlɔɲa] is a village in the administrative district of Gmina Żmudź, within Chełm County, Lublin Voivodeship, in eastern Poland.
